= Frying pan =

Flat bottomed pan for cooking food on a stove

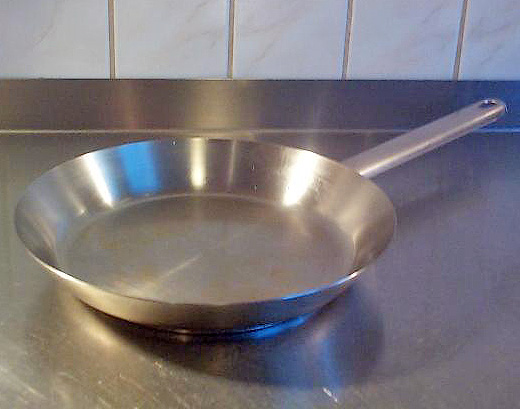
A stainless steel frying pan

A frying pan, also called frypan or skillet, is a flat-bottomed cookware used for frying, searing and browning foods. It typically ranges from 20 to 30 cm (8 to 12 in) in diameter with relatively low sides that flare outwards, a long handle and no lid. Larger pans may have a small loop handle on the opposite side to the main handle. A pan of similar dimensions, but with less flared, more vertical sides and often with a lid, is called a sauté pan. While a sauté pan can be used as a frying pan, it is designed for lower-heat cooking.

== History ==
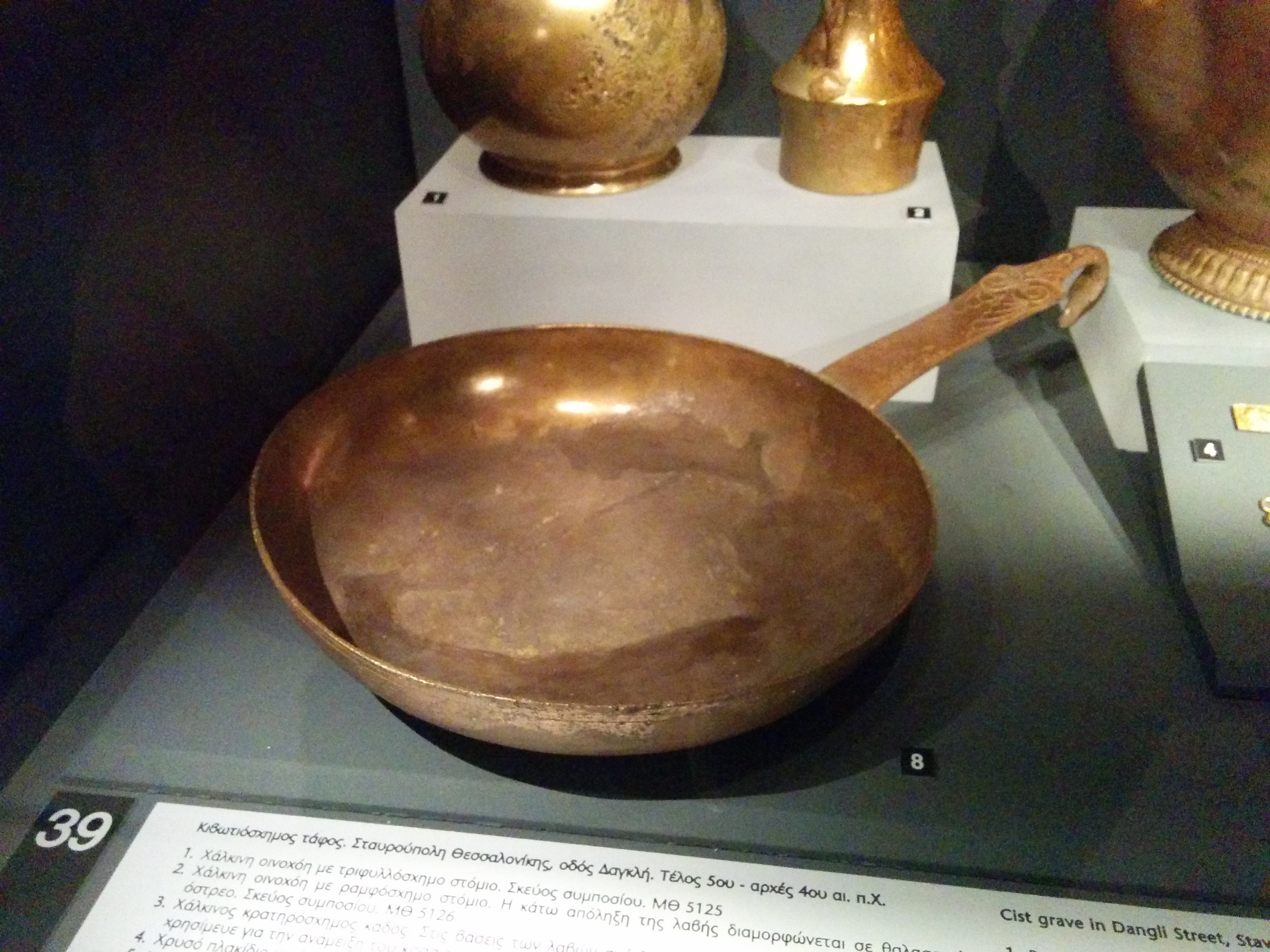
Copper frying pan dated end 5th to early 4th century BC, Archaeological Museum of Thessaloniki. The handle is ornamented with floral engravings and ends in the shape of a goose head.

Copper frying pans were used in ancient Mesopotamia. Frying pans were also known in ancient Greece, where they were called tágēnon (Ancient Greek: τάγηνον) and teganon (τήγανον) and Rome, where they were called patella or sartago. The word pan derives from the Old English panna. Before the introduction of the kitchen stove in the mid-19th century, a commonly used cast-iron cooking pan called a 'spider' had a handle and three legs used to stand up in the coals and ashes of the fire. Cooking pots and pans with legless, flat bottoms were designed when cooking stoves became popular; this period of the late 19th century saw the introduction of the flat cast-iron skillet.

== Frying pan relatives ==
A versatile pan that combines the benefits of both the sauté pan and the frying pan has higher, sloping sides, often slightly curved. This pan is called a sauteuse (literally: a sauté pan), an evasée (denoting a pan with sloping sides), or a fait-tout (literally "does everything").

A "rappie pan" is a pan used to make rappie pie, an Acadian potato dish. The pan is made from aluminum or stainless steel.

== Construction ==
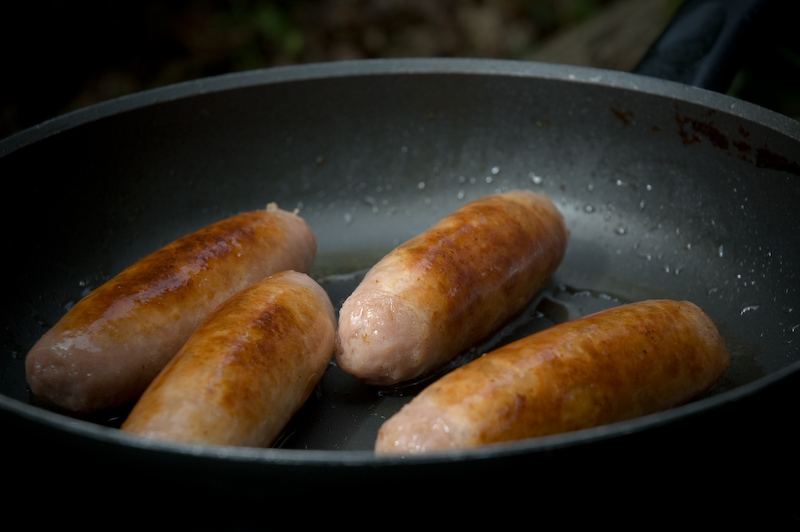
Sausages being pan fried in a frying pan

Traditionally, frying pans were made from cast iron, carbon steel or copper lined with tin, for their different qualities and properties. Copper pans are highly thermally conductive, making them useful for evenly sautéing. However, they are also highly reactive with most foods, so many of copper pans sold now have a tin lining which can be replaced when it wears out. Cast iron pans are used because although they do not conduct heat very evenly, they retain it quite well, making them useful for searing meats and vegetables. Carbon steel cookware is used, as over time it can develop a highly nonstick patina of polymerized oil called "seasoning", useful for cooking protein that is prone to stick, such as fish and eggs. While all of these materials are still commonly used in professional kitchens, many modern materials have supplanted them in the consumer market. Nowadays, most frying pans are created from metals such as aluminium or stainless steel. The materials and construction method used in modern frying pans vary greatly, and some typical materials include:

- Aluminium or anodized aluminium
- Cast iron
- Copper
- Stainless steel
- Clad stainless steel with an aluminium or copper core

A coating is sometimes applied to the surface of the pan to make it non-stick. Frying pans made from bare cast iron or carbon steel can also gain non-stick properties through seasoning and use.

== Variants ==
=== Non-stick ===
A process for bonding Teflon to chemically roughened aluminium was patented in France by Marc Gregoire in 1954. In 1956, he formed a company to market non-stick cookware under the "Tefal" brand name. The durability of the early coatings was poor, but improvements in manufacturing have made these products a kitchen standard. The surface is not as tough as metal and the use of metal utensils (e.g. spatulas) can permanently mar the coating and degrade its non-stick property.

For some cooking preparations, a non-stick frying pan is inappropriate, especially for deglazing, where the residue of browning is to be incorporated in a later step such as a pan sauce. Since little to no residue can stick to the surface, the sauce will fail for lack of its primary flavouring agent.

=== Electric ===
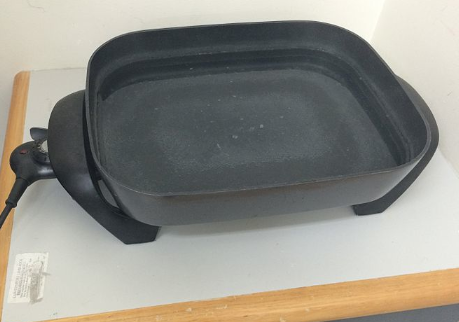
Electric frying pan

An electric frying pan or electric skillet incorporates an electric heating element into the frying pan itself and so can function independently of a cooking stove. Accordingly, it has heat-insulated legs for standing on a countertop. (The legs usually attach to handles.) Electric frying pans are commonly made in shapes that are unusual for 'unpowered' frying pans, notably square and rectangular. Most are designed with straighter sides than their stovetop cousins and include a lid. In this way, they are a cross between a frying pan and a sauté pan.

A modern electric skillet has an additional advantage over the stovetop version: heat regulation. The detachable power cord incorporates a thermostatic control for maintaining the desired temperature.

With the perfection of the thermostatic control, the electric skillet became a popular kitchen appliance. In 1953, Sunbeam introduced the Automatic Frypan with built-in temperature controls, which helped the device gain widespread popularity. Although it largely has been supplanted by the microwave oven, it is still in use in many kitchens.

== See also ==
- Blackening (cooking) – Method to form a crust of herbs and spices
- Griddle – Type of cooking device
- List of cooking vessels
- Pan frying – Cooking technique
