= Wok =

Cooking vessel originating in China

- "Wok" in Traditional (top) and Simplified (bottom) Chinese characters
- Traditional Chinese: 鑊
- Simplified Chinese: 镬
Transcriptions
Standard Mandarin
- Hanyu Pinyin: huò
- Wade–Giles: huo^{4}
- IPA: [xwô]
Yue: Cantonese
- Yale Romanization: wohk
- Jyutping: wok6
- IPA: [wɔk̚˨]

Alternative Chinese name
- Traditional Chinese: 炒鍋
- Simplified Chinese: 炒锅
Transcriptions
Standard Mandarin
- Hanyu Pinyin: chǎoguō
Southern Min
- Hokkien POJ: tshá-ko

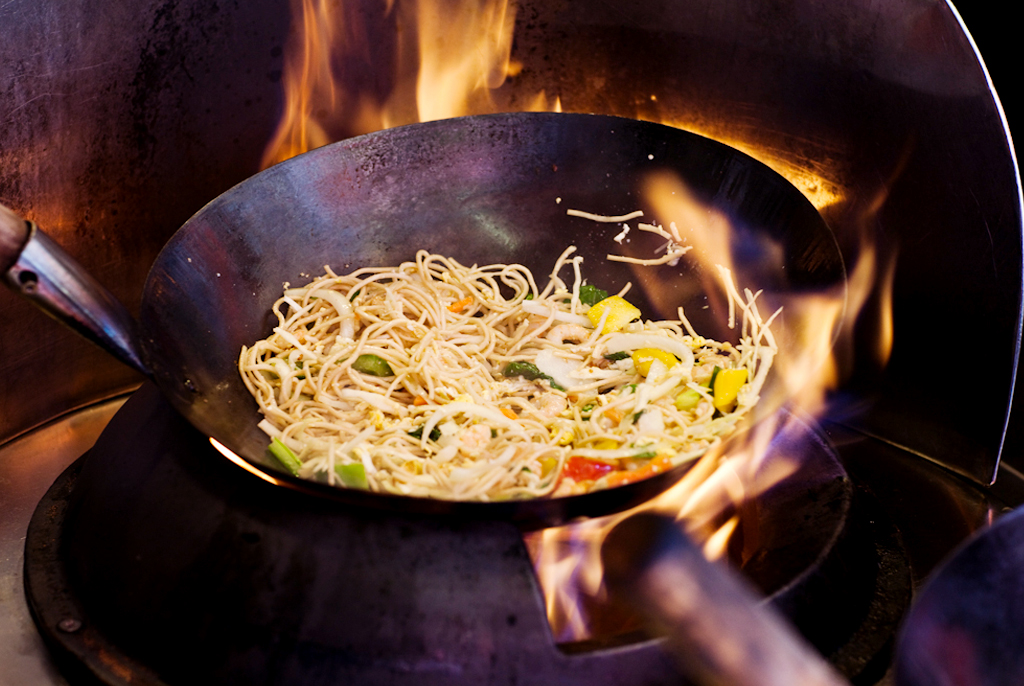
A wok being used for stir frying

A wok (simplified Chinese: 镬; traditional Chinese: 鑊; pinyin: huò; Cantonese Yale: wohk) is a deep round-bottomed cooking pan of either indigenous Chinese origin or derived from the South Asian karahi. It is common in Greater China, and similar pans are found in parts of East, South and Southeast Asia, as well as being popular in other parts of the world.

Woks are used in a range of Chinese cooking techniques, including stir frying, steaming, pan frying, deep frying, poaching, boiling, braising, searing, stewing, making soup, smoking and roasting nuts. Wok cooking is often done with utensils called chǎn (spatula) or sháo (ladle) whose long handles protect cooks from high heat. The uniqueness of wok cooking includes the Cantonese tradition of wok hei, "breath of the wok".

== History ==
The origin of the wok is unclear, with both an indigenous origin theory and a South/Southeast Asian origin theory. In the indigenous origin theory scholars believe the Wok to have originated from ancient Chinese cooking pots that are at least 3000 years old. Wilkinson in his 2012 book Chinese history: a new manual, believes the wok evolved from an ancient prehistoric cooking pot called the fu, a round bottom multi-purpose cooking pot.In the South/Southeast Asian origin theory scholars believe it originated from the karahi, as well as the Southeast Asian kuali (believed to be the etymology of Mandarin 鑊). These cooking vessels are universal in South and Southeast Asian cuisine for stewing and quick evaporation. They likely entered China via Central Asia from India where it evolved into the wok. In his 1988 book The Food of China, E.N. Anderson writes:

Wok is a Cantonese word; the Mandarin is Guō. The wok appears to be a rather recent acquisition as Chinese kitchen furniture goes; it has been around for only two thousand years. The first woks are little pottery models on the pottery stove models in Han Dynasty tombs. Since the same sort of pan is universal in India and Southeast Asia, where it is known as a Kuali in several languages, I strongly suspect borrowing [of the word] (probably from India via Central Asia) — kuo must have evolved from some word close to Kuali.

The first possible depictions of woks in China appeared in the Han dynasty (c. 202 BCE – 220 CE). But these are conjectural, since these "woks" were made of clay and were only used to dry grains. Metal woks only started to appear in China in the Ming dynasty (1368–1644), where it was first used for stir frying (an original Han Chinese innovation).

== Characteristics ==
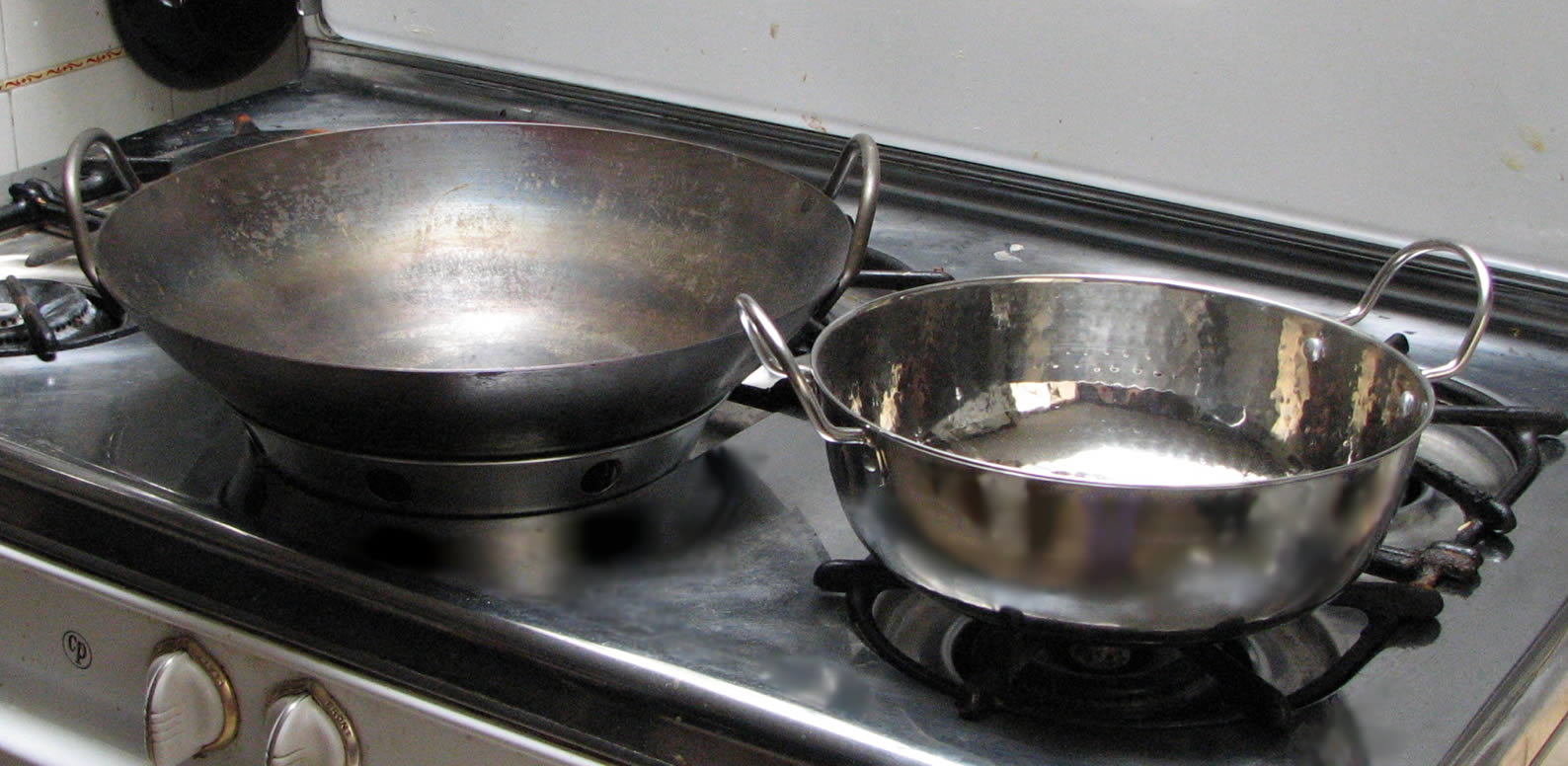
A wok (left) and karahi on a Western-style gas stove. Note that the karahi is sitting on an ordinary burner cover, while the round-bottomed wok is balanced on a wok-ring.

The wok's most distinguishing feature is its shape. Classic woks have a rounded bottom. Hand-hammered woks are sometimes flipped inside out after being shaped, giving the wok a gentle flare to the edge that makes it easier to push food up onto the sides of the wok. Woks sold in Western countries are sometimes found with flat bottoms—this makes them more similar to a deep frying pan. The flat bottom allows the wok to be used on an electric stove, where a rounded wok would not be able to fully contact the stove's heating element. A round-bottom wok enables the traditional round spatula or ladle to pick all the food up at the bottom of the wok and toss it around easily; this is difficult with a flat bottom. With a gas hob, or traditional pit stove, the bottom of a round wok can get hotter than a flat wok and so is better for stir frying.

Most woks range from 300 to 360 mm (12 to 14 in) or more in diameter. Woks of 360 mm (14 in) (suitable for a family of 3 or 4) are the most common, but home woks can be found as small as 200 mm (8 in) and as large as 910 mm (36 in). Smaller woks are typically used for quick cooking techniques at high heat such as stir frying (Chinese: 炒; pinyin: chǎo). Large woks over a meter wide are mainly used by restaurants or community kitchens for cooking rice or soup, or for boiling water.

=== Materials ===
The most common materials used in making woks today are carbon steel and cast iron. Although the latter was the most common type used in the past, cooks tend to be divided on whether carbon steel or cast iron woks are superior.

==== Carbon steel ====
Currently, carbon steel is the most widely used material, being relatively inexpensive, relatively light in weight, providing quick heat conduction as it has a low specific heat capacity, and having reasonable durability. Their light weight makes them easier to lift and quicker to heat. Carbon steel woks, however, tend to be more difficult to season than those made of cast-iron ('seasoning', or carbonizing the cooking surface of a wok, is required to prevent foods from sticking and to remove metallic tastes and odors). Carbon steel woks vary widely in price, style, and quality, which is based on ply and forming technique. The lowest quality steel woks tend to be stamped by machine from a single 'ply' or piece of stamped steel. Less expensive woks have a higher tendency to deform and misshape. Cooking with lower quality woks is also more difficult and precarious since they often have a "hot spot". Higher quality, mass-produced woks are made of heavy gauge (14-gauge or thicker) steel, and are either machine-hammered or made of spun steel. The best quality woks are almost always hand-made, being pounded into shape by hand ("hand hammered") from two or more sheets of carbon steel which are shaped into final form by a ring-forming or hand-forging process.

==== Cast iron ====
Two types of cast iron woks can be found in the market. Chinese-made cast iron woks are very thin (3 mm (0.12 in)), weighing only a little more than a carbon steel wok of similar size, while cast iron woks typically produced in the West tend to be much thicker (9 mm (0.35 in)), and very heavy. Because of the thickness of the cast iron, Western-style cast iron woks take much longer to bring up to cooking temperature, and their weight also makes stir-frying and bao techniques difficult.

Cast iron woks form a more stable carbonized layer of seasoning which makes it less prone to food sticking on the pan. While cast iron woks are superior to carbon steel woks in heat retention and uniform heat distribution, they respond slowly to heat adjustments and are slow to cool once taken off the fire. Because of this, food cooked in a cast-iron wok must be promptly removed from the wok as soon as it is done to prevent overcooking. Chinese-style cast iron woks, although relatively light, are fragile and are prone to shattering if dropped or mishandled.

==== Non-stick ====
Steel woks coated with non-stick coatings such as PFA and Teflon, a development originated in Western countries, are now popular in Asia as well. These woks cannot be used with metal utensils, and foods cooked in non-stick woks tend to retain juices instead of browning in the pan. As they necessarily lack the carbonizing or seasoning of the classic steel or iron wok, non-stick woks do not impart the distinctive taste or sensation of wok hei. The newest nonstick coatings will withstand temperatures of up to 260 °C (500 °F), sufficient for stir-frying. Woks are also now being introduced with clad or five-layer construction, which sandwich a thick layer of aluminum or copper between two sheets of stainless steel. Clad woks can cost five to ten times the price of a traditional carbon steel or cast-iron wok, yet cook no better; for this reason they are not used in most professional restaurant kitchens. Clad woks are also slower to heat than traditional woks and not nearly as efficient for stir-frying.

==== Aluminium ====
Woks can also be made from aluminium. Although an excellent conductor of heat, it has somewhat inferior thermal capacity to cast iron or carbon steel, it loses heat to convection much faster than carbon steel, and it may be constructed much thinner than cast iron. Although anodized aluminium alloys can stand up to constant use, plain aluminium woks are too soft and damage easily. Aluminium is mostly used for wok lids.

=== Handles ===
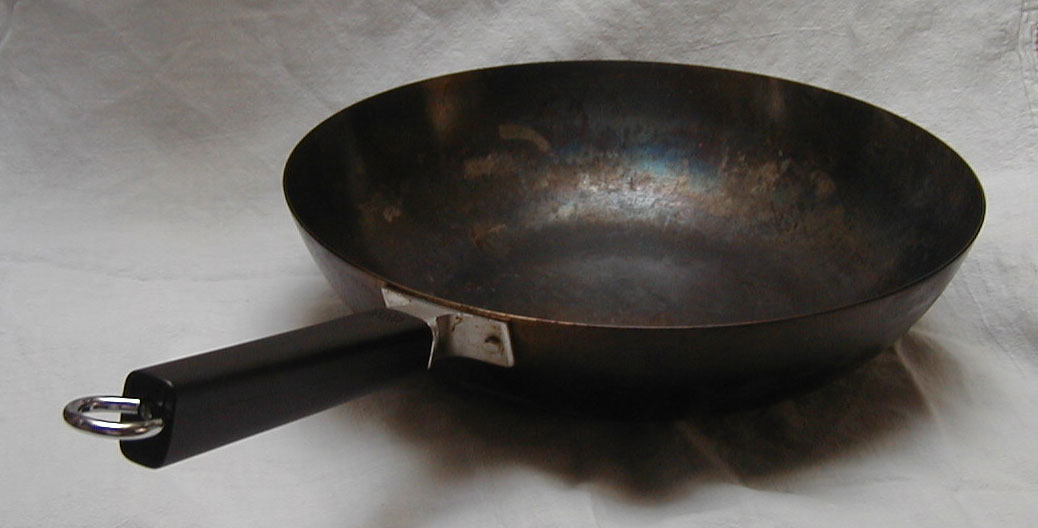
A stick-handled flat-bottomed "Peking pan". While the surface looks like Teflon, it is actually well-seasoned carbon steel

The handles for woks come in two styles: loops and stick. Loop handles mounted on opposite sides of the wok are typical in southern China. The twin small loop handles are the most common handle type for woks of all types and materials, and are usually made of bare metal. Cooks needing to hold the wok to toss the food in cooking do so by holding a loop handle with a thick towel (though some woks have spool-shaped wooden or plastic covers over the metal of the handle). Cooking with the tossing action in loop-handled woks requires a large amount of hand, arm and wrist strength. Loop handles typically come in pairs on the wok and are riveted, welded or extended from the wok basin.

Stick handles are long, made of steel, and are usually welded or riveted to the wok basin, or are an actual direct extension of the metal of the basin. Stick handles are popular in northern China, where food in the wok is frequently turned with a tossing motion of the arm and wrist when stir-frying food. The classic stick handle is made of hollow hammered steel, but other materials may be used, including wood or plastic-covered hand grips. Because of their popularity in northern China, stick-handled woks are often referred to as "pao woks" or "Peking pans". Stick handles are normally not found on cast-iron woks since the wok is either too heavy for the handle or the metal is too thin to handle the tensile stress exerted by the handle. Larger-diameter woks with stick-type handles frequently incorporate a "helper" handle consisting of a loop on the opposite side of the wok, which aids in handling.

== Seasoning ==
Woks are often seasoned by a process called 'Long Yao', which is particularly used by restaurants, and involves heating the wok to high temperatures (over 200C, where the Leidenfrost effect operates with water droplets) without any oil, and then cold oil is added and swirled around to coat the surface thoroughly. This gives a very slippery, albeit temporary, layer that prevents sticking.

Over time, with repeated sessions of long yao woks tend to build up a seasoning layer which additionally helps prevent food from sticking during cooking.

== Cooking ==
The wok can be used in a large number of cooking methods. Before the introduction of Western cookware, it was often used for all cooking techniques including:

- Boiling: For boiling water, soups, dumplings, or rice. In the latter case, guoba often forms.
- Braising: Braised dishes are commonly made using woks. Braising is useful when reducing sauces.
- Deep frying: This is usually accomplished with larger woks to reduce splashing, but for deep frying of less food or small food items, small woks are also used.
- Pan frying: Food that is fried using a small amount of oil in the bottom of a pan
- Roasting: Food may be cooked with dry heat in an enclosed pan with lid. Whole chestnuts are dry roasted by tossing them in a dry wok with several pounds of small stones.
- Searing: Food is browned on its outer surfaces through the application of high heat
- Smoking: Food can be hot smoked by putting the smoking material in the bottom of the wok while food is placed on a rack above.
- Steaming: Done using a dedicated wok for boiling water in combination with steaming baskets
- Stewing: Woks are sometimes used for stewing though it is more common in Chinese cuisines to use either stoneware or porcelain for such purposes, especially when longer stewing times are required. Small woks are for hot pot, particularly in Hainan cuisine. These are served at the table over a sterno flame.
- Stir frying: Frying food quickly in a small amount of oil over high heat while stirring continuously.

=== Wok hei ===
"Wok hei" (simplified Chinese: 镬气; traditional Chinese: 鑊氣; pinyin: huò qì; Jyutping: wok^{6} hei^{3}) literally, the "breath of the wok", is the distinct charred, smoky flavor resulting from stir-frying foods over an open flame in Cantonese cuisine. The second character (simplified Chinese: 气; traditional Chinese: 氣) is transliterated as qi (chi) according to its Standard Chinese pronunciation, so wok hei is sometimes rendered as wok chi in Western cookbooks. Wok hei refers to the flavor, taste, and "essence" imparted by a hot wok on food during stir frying. It is particularly important for Cantonese dishes requiring high heat for fragrance such as char kuay teow and beef chao fen. Out of the Eight Culinary Traditions of China, the wok hei concept is only encountered in Cantonese cuisine, and may not even be an accepted underlying principle in most other Chinese cuisines.

To impart wok hei the traditional way, the food is cooked in a seasoned wok over a high flame while being stirred and tossed quickly. Constant contact with the heat source is crucial as the addition of new ingredients and each toss of the wok inevitably cools the wok down; therefore, cooking over flame is preferred. Consequently, many chefs (especially those with less-than-ideal cookers) may cook in small batches to overcome this problem so that the wok is still as hot as it can be, and to avoid "stewing" the food, instead. When cooking over gas stoves or open flame, it additionally allows for the splattering of fine oil particles to catch the flame into the wok; this is easily achieved when experienced chefs toss the wok and can be a demonstration of experience. For these reasons, cooking over an open flame is preferable to other types of stoves. Cooking with coated woks (e.g. nonstick) notably will not give the distinct taste of wok hei, which is partially imbued from previous cooking sessions. In practical terms, the flavor imparted by chemical compounds results from caramelization, Maillard reactions, and the partial combustion of oil that come from charring and searing of the food at very high heat in excess of 200 °C (392 °F). Aside from flavor, the texture of the cooked items and smell involved also describe wok hei.

In Hong Kong, wok hei is traditionally street food, cooked in open-air dai pai dongs ("big license stalls") over a very hot kerosene flame. Due to government regulations, the number of such stalls has been reduced from hundreds to about 20 in 2024.

== Wok stoves ==
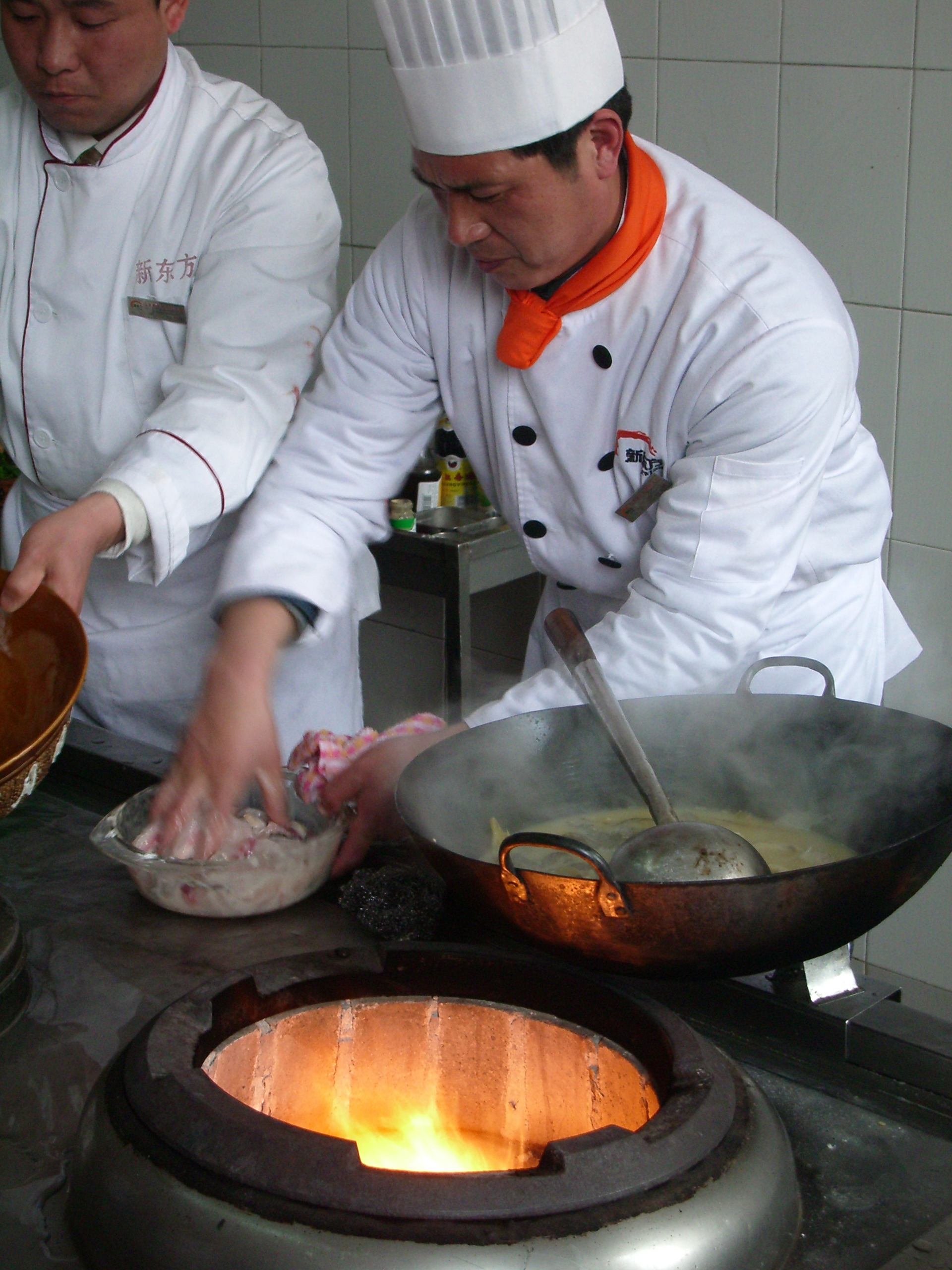
Preparing food over a modern gas-fired, pit-type wok stove

The two styles of traditional Chinese wok stoves (灶)

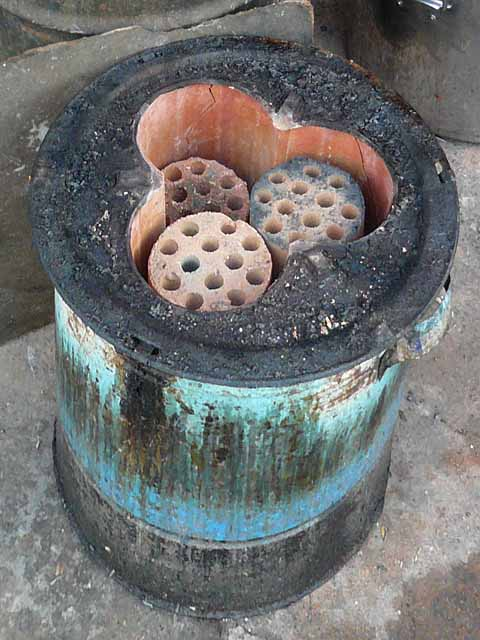
Outdoor charcoal wok stove

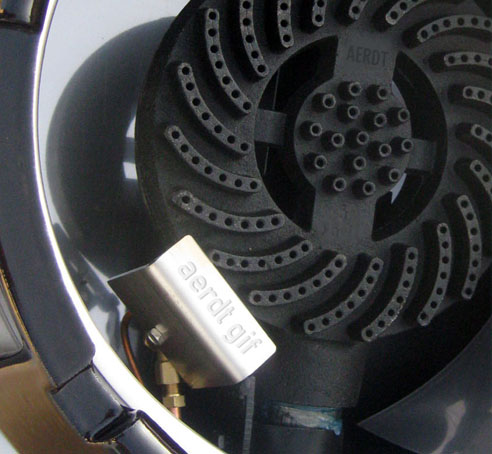
Natural gas burner head from a modern gas stove for woks

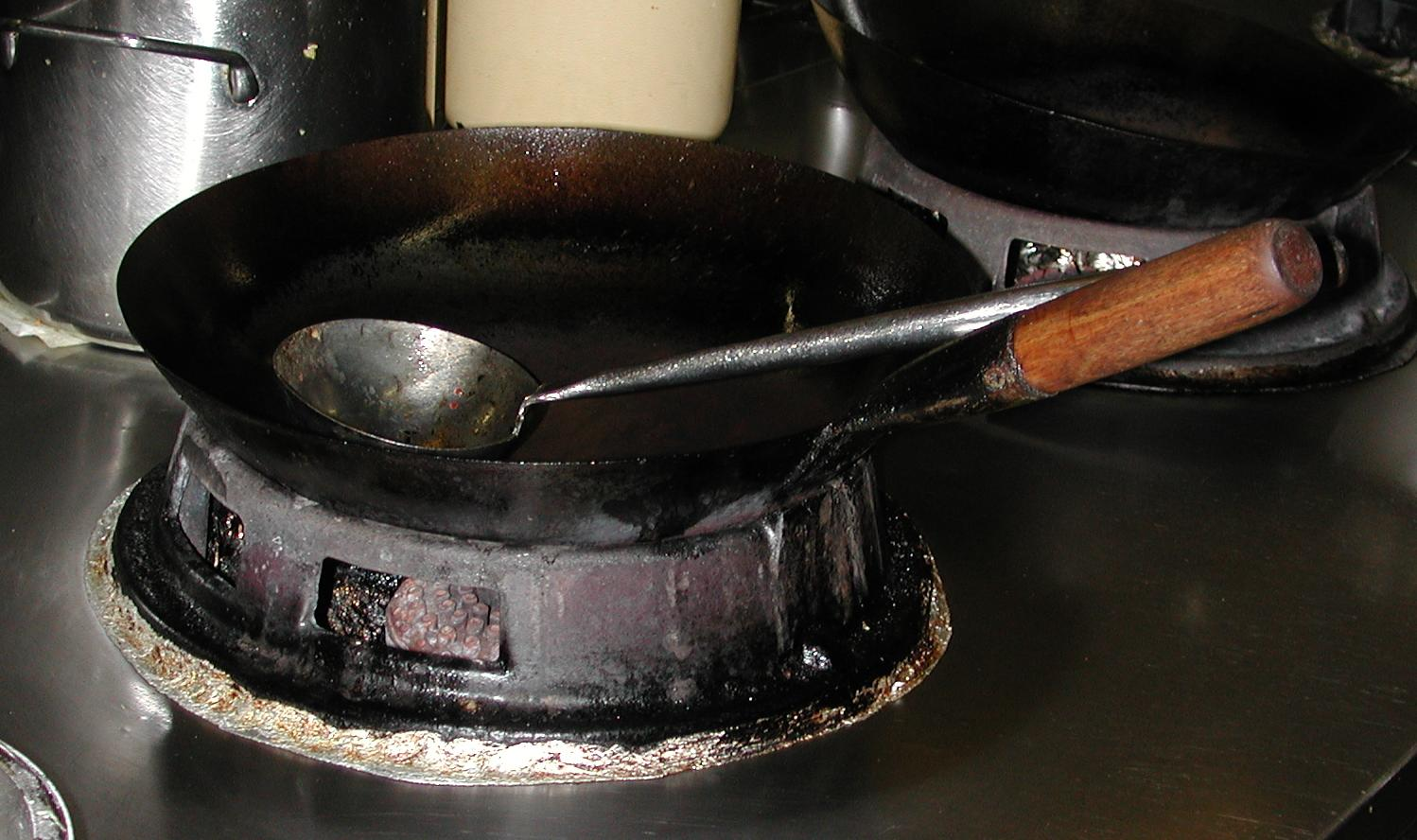
A carbon steel wok on a Chinese wok stove

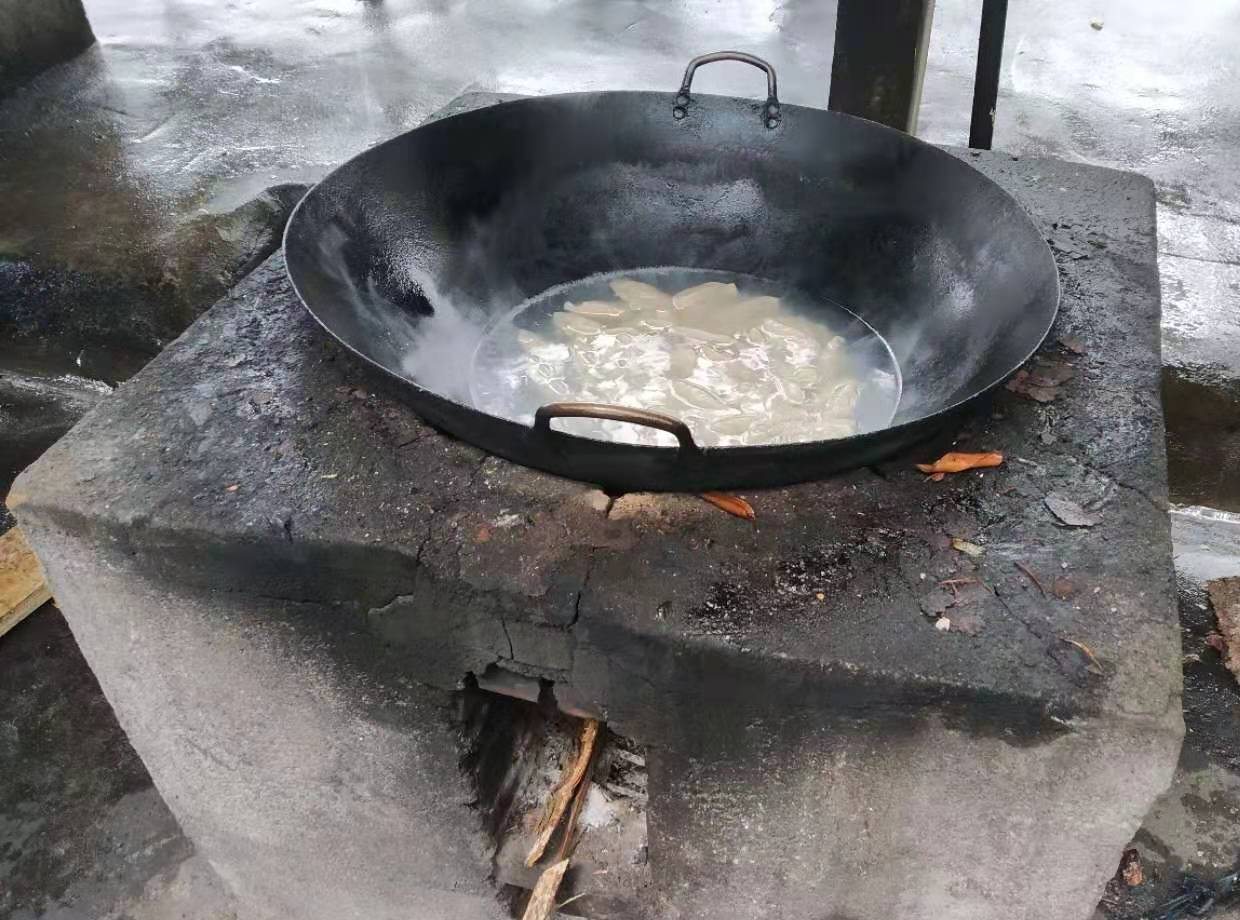
A wok on an outdoor wood stove

=== Traditional ===
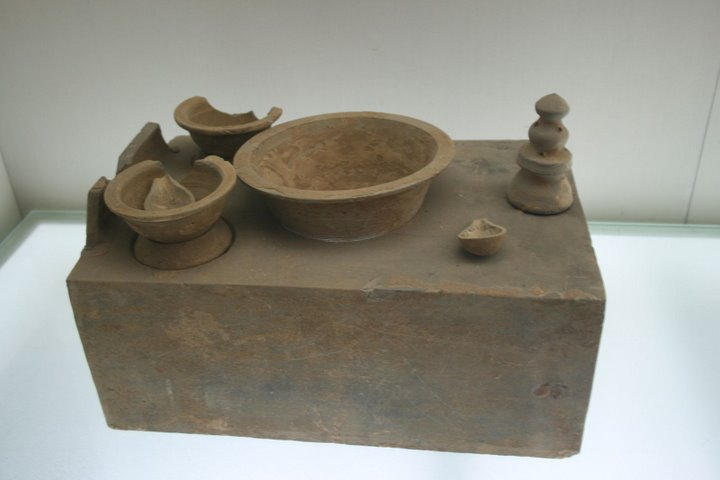
A Han dynasty Chinese model with clay pots used to dry grains. The pots' similarity to modern woks has led to conjecture that modern woks evolved from basic features of pots like these.

Woks were designed to be used over the traditional Chinese pit-style hearth (Chinese: 灶; pinyin: zào) with the wok recessed into the stove top, where the heat is fully directed at the bottom of the wok. Round grate rings on the edge of the opening provide stability to the wok. There are two styles of traditional wok stoves. The same design aspects of these Chinese stoves can be seen in traditional Japanese kamado stoves. The more primitive style was used outdoors or in well ventilated areas since hot gasses from the firebox exhaust around the wok. The more advanced style, found in better-off households, has a chimney and may be used indoors. These stoves are similar in design to modern rocket stoves.

Pit stoves originally burned wood or coal but are now more typically heated by natural gas with the burner recessed below the stovetop. In areas where natural gas is unavailable, LPG may be used instead. With the adoption of gas and its less objectionable combustion products, the chimney has been replaced by the vent hood.

This type of stove allows foods to be stir-fried at a very high heat, sometimes hot enough to deform the wok itself. Professional chefs in Chinese restaurants often use pit stoves since they have the heating power to give food an alluring wok hei.

=== Gas ===
Traditionally shaped woks can be used on some Western-style (flat-topped) gas stoves by removing a burner cover and replacing it with a "wok ring", which provides stability and concentrates heat. Although not as ideal as "pit stoves", these allow woks to be used in a manner more suitable for their design and are good enough for most tasks required in home cooking.

Wok rings are sold in cylindrical and conical shapes. For greatest efficiency with the conical wok ring, position it with the wide side up. This allows the base of the wok to sit closer to the heat source.

In recent years, some consumer indoor stoves using natural gas or propane have begun offering higher-BTU burners. A few manufacturers of such stoves, notably Kenmore Appliances and Viking Range Corp. now include a specially designed high-output bridge-type wok burner as part of their standard or optional equipment, though even high-heat models are limited to a maximum of around 27,000 BTU (7.9 kW).

Because of the high cost of kitchen modifications, coupled with increased heat and smoke generated in the kitchen, more home chefs are using their wok outdoors on high-heat propane burners with curved wok support grates. Many inexpensive propane burners are easily capable of 60,000–270,000 BTU (17.5–22 kW) or more, easily surpassing most in-home gas stoves.

=== Electric ===
Woks, round or flat bottomed, do not generally work well for stir-frying or other quick cooking methods when used on an electric cooker. These stoves do not produce the large amounts of quick even heat required for stir-frying. It is possible, however, to find round-shaped electric stove elements that will fit the curve of a wok, which allows the wok to be heated at its bottom along with part of its sides. A flat-bottomed wok may also work better on an electric stove.

Coupled with the lower heat retention of woks, meals stir-fried on electric stoves have a tendency to stew and boil when too much food is in the wok rather than "fry" as in traditional woks, thus not producing wok hei. A wok can, however, benefit from the slow steady heating of electric stoves when used for slower cooking methods such as stewing, braising, and steaming, and immersion cooking techniques such as frying and boiling. Many Chinese cooks use Western style cast-iron pans for stir-frying on electric stoves, since they hold enough heat for the required sustained high temperatures.

A newer trend in woks is the electric wok, where no stove is needed. This type of wok is plugged into an electrical outlet and the heating element is in the wok. Like stove-mounted non-stick woks, these woks can also only be used at lower temperatures than traditional woks.

=== Induction ===
Induction cookers generate heat in induction-compatible cookware via direct magnetic stimulation of the pan material. While carbon steel and cast iron (the most common wok materials) are induction-compatible metals, induction cooking also requires close contact between the cooking vessel and the induction burner. This presents problems with tossing techniques, where the wok is lifted off the burner and agitated, will break contact and turn off the burner. Traditionally shaped woks, which are round-bottomed, also do not have enough contact with the cooking surface to generate notable heat. Bowl-shaped induction cookers overcome this problem and can be used suitably for wok cooking in locations where gas stoves are not suitable.

Flat-bottomed woks make sufficient contact to generate heat. Some cookware makers are now offering round-bottomed woks with a small flat spot to provide induction contact, with a specially designed support ring, and some induction cooktops are now also available with a rounded burner that is able to make contact with the rounded bottom of a traditional wok. In both cases, the food will need to be stirred with a cooking utensil, instead of being tossed by lifting the wok itself.

== Advantages ==
The main advantage of the wok, beyond its constructed material, is its curved, concave shape. This shape produces a small, hot area at the bottom which allows some of the food to be seared by intense heat while using relatively little fuel. The large sloped sides also make it easier for chefs to toss solid and thick liquid food with less spillage and a greater margin of safety. The curved sides also allow a person to cook without having to "chase the food around the pan", since bite-sized or finely chopped stir-fry ingredients usually tumble back to the center of the wok when agitated.

The curve also provides a larger usable cooking surface versus Western-style pots and pans, which typically have vertical edges. This allows large pieces of food seared at the bottom of the wok to be pushed up the gently sloped sides to continue cooking at a slower rate. While this occurs another ingredient for the same dish needing high heat is being cooked at the bottom. The pointed bottom also allows even small amounts of oil to pool. As such, large food items can be shallow fried, while finely chopped garlic, chili peppers, scallions, and ginger can be essentially deep-fried in both cases with very small amounts of cooking oil.

== Other wok-like pans ==
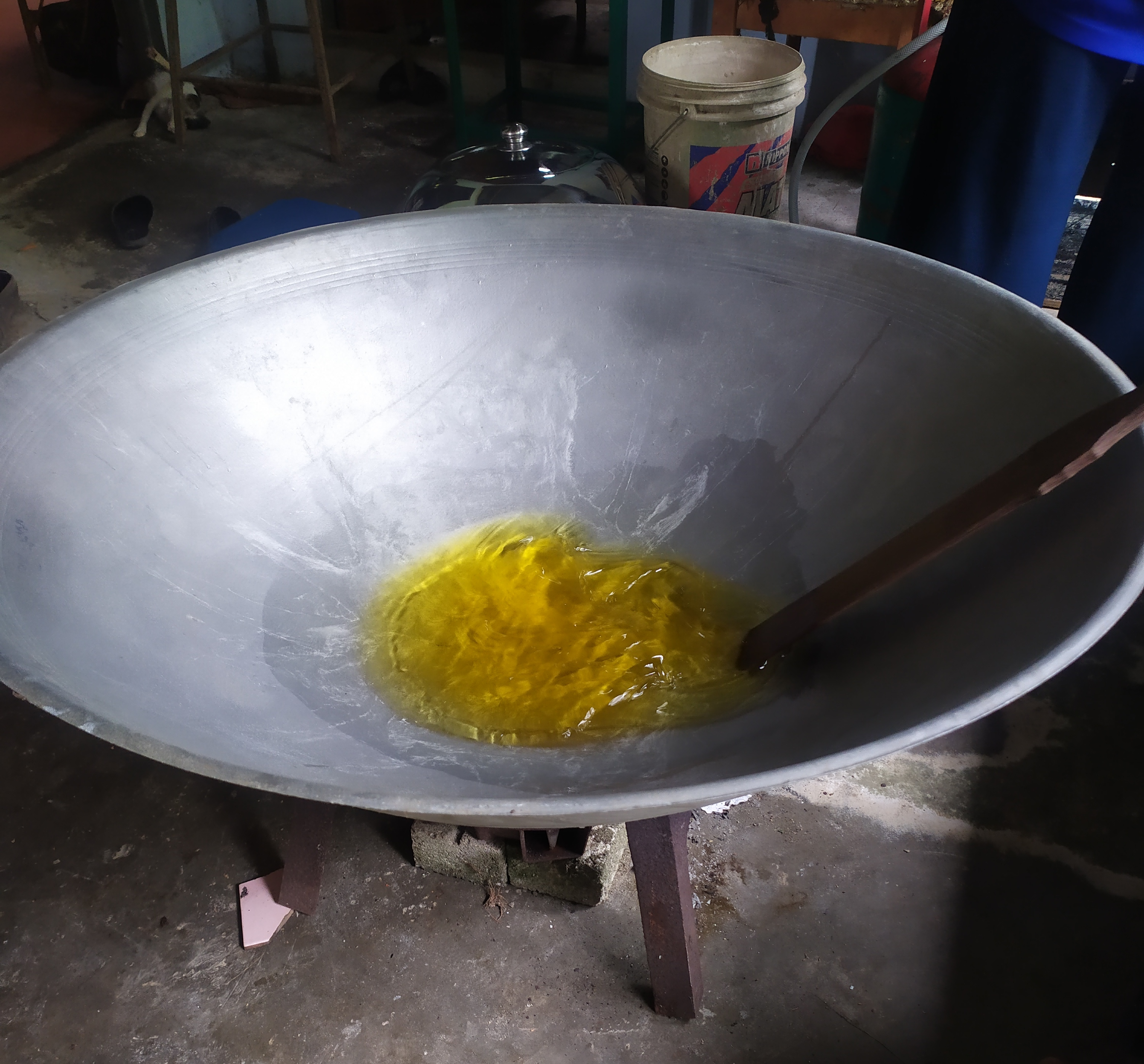
An oiled kawah being preheated on a makeshift gas stove

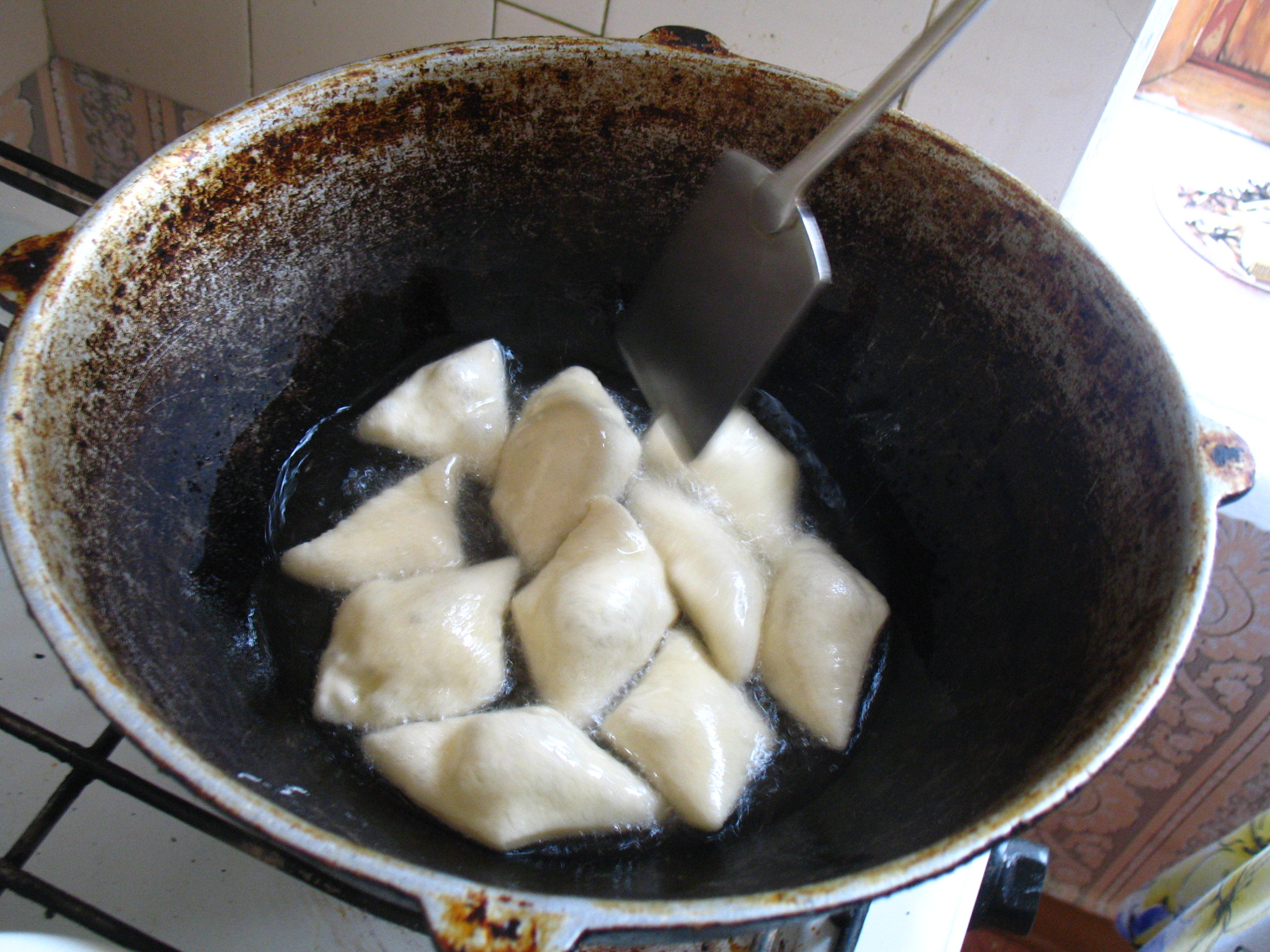
Frying boorsoq in a qazan

Wok-like pans are found in many culinary traditions around the world, often adapted to local cooking styles and ingredients while maintaining the core utility of a deep, curved vessel suited for high-heat cooking and stir frying.

In Indonesia, a wok-like pan is known as a penggorengan or wajan (also spelled wadjang, from Javanese language, from the root word waja meaning "steel"). In Malaysia, it is called a kuali (small wok) or kawah (big wok). Similarly, in the Philippines, the wok is known as kawali in Tagalog or kalaha in Cebuano (Philippine Spanish: carajay), and it is called talyasi in Kapampangan. Bigger pans used for festivals and gatherings are known as kawa in most languages of the Philippines.

In northern Mexico and the southwestern United States, there is a pan called a discada originally fashioned from an old plow disc and repurposed as a cooking surface. Used traditionally in vaquero cooking, giving it the "cowboy wok" nickname, it is placed over an open flame or gas burner and used to prepare a variety of meat-heavy discada dishes. Its concave shape and durability mirror the wok’s utility, particularly in outdoor cooking contexts.

In Turkey and central Asia, a similar utensil is called a kazan. Traditionally made of cast iron or aluminum, the kazan is a large, deep, round-bottomed pot used for cooking over open flames. It is widely used in the preparation of pilaf, soups, and stews, often during communal or outdoor gatherings. Though it lacks a handle and differs slightly in form, the kazan’s shape and function closely resemble a wok, particularly in its ability to cook large quantities with direct heat.

In India, a similar pan is called karahi. In Japan, the wok is called a chūkanabe (中華鍋, literally "Chinese pot"). In South India, the Chinese wok became a part of South Indian cooking, where it is called the cheena chatti (literally, "Chinese pot" in Malayalam and Tamil).

In Spain, a similar wide, shallow pan known as the paellera or paella pan is used to prepare paella and other rice-based dishes. Though it has a flat bottom and does not share the wok’s concavity, the paella pan performs a comparable role in distributing high heat evenly over a large surface, ideal for cooking food quickly and uniformly.

== See also ==
- Chinese cuisine
  - Cantonese cuisine
  - Egg fried rice
- List of cooking techniques
- List of cooking vessels
- Wok racing
