= Wok Express =

Fast food chain in India

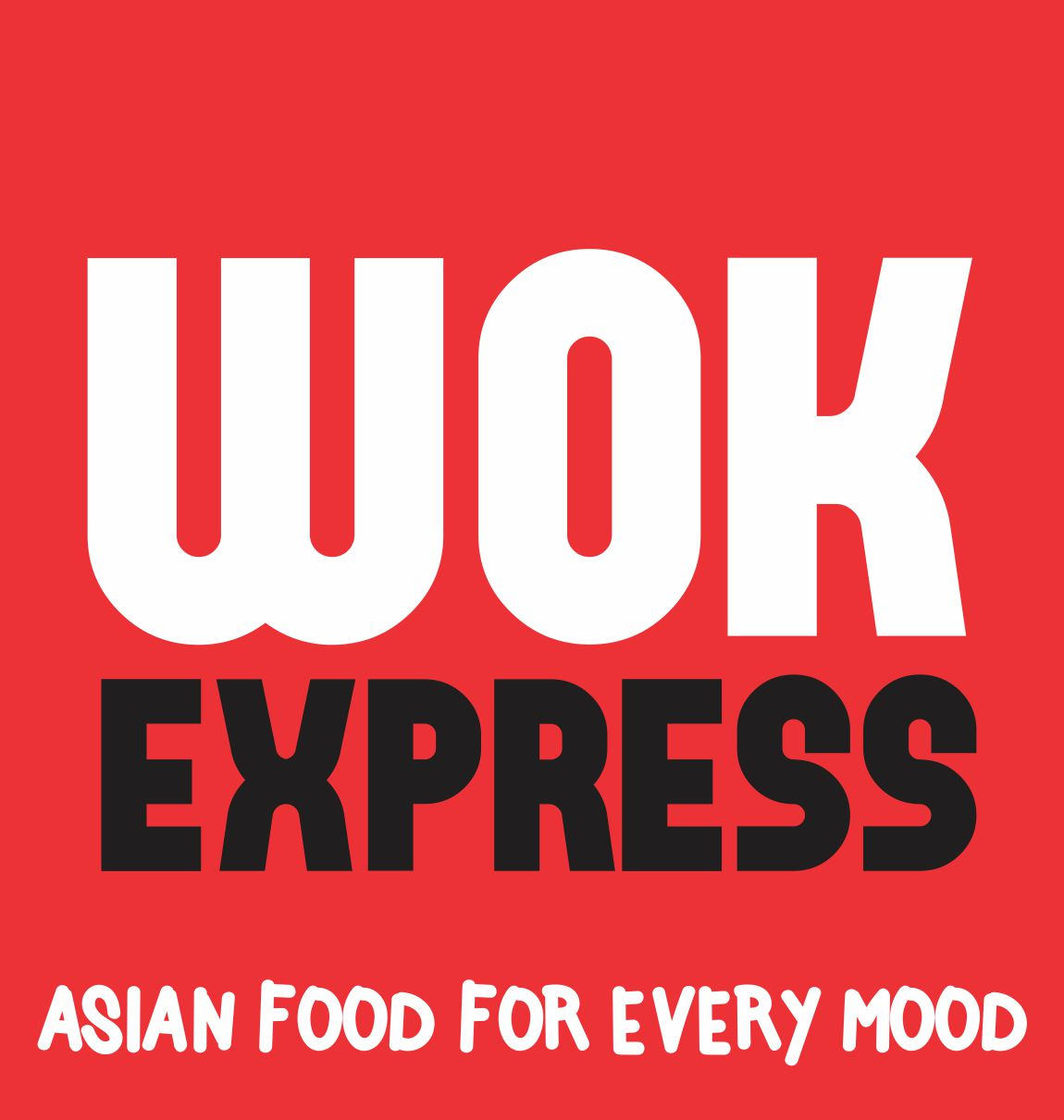
- Type: Privately held company
- Industry: Food and beverages
- Founded: May 2015
- Founder: Aayush Agrawal
- Headquarters: Mumbai, Maharashtra, India
- Number of locations: 25, as of May 2018
- Area served: Mumbai, Maharashtra, India Pune, Maharashtra, India
- Key people: Aayush Agrawal, director – Lenexis FoodWorks, Wok Express
- Products: Pan Asian gourmet food across Thai, Burmese, Chinese, and Japanese cuisines – sushi, customisable woks, bao, appetisers, chicken wings, soups and bubble teas
- Number of employees: 500–800
- Parent: Lenexis FoodWorks Pvt. Ltd.
- Website: wokexpress.com

Wok Express is an Indian, Pan-Asian food brand in the QSR (quick-service restaurants) space. Wok Express was launched in Mumbai in May 2015.

Wok Express currently has 25 restaurants across Mumbai, and started its first restaurant in Pune in July 2018.

Lenexis FoodWorks, the parent company, has plans to expand its presence to up to 150 locations in the coming years.
