= Karahi chadana =

Karahi chadana is a typical North Indian tradition that happens five days before the wedding, in which a large wok style pan is set up to cook food.

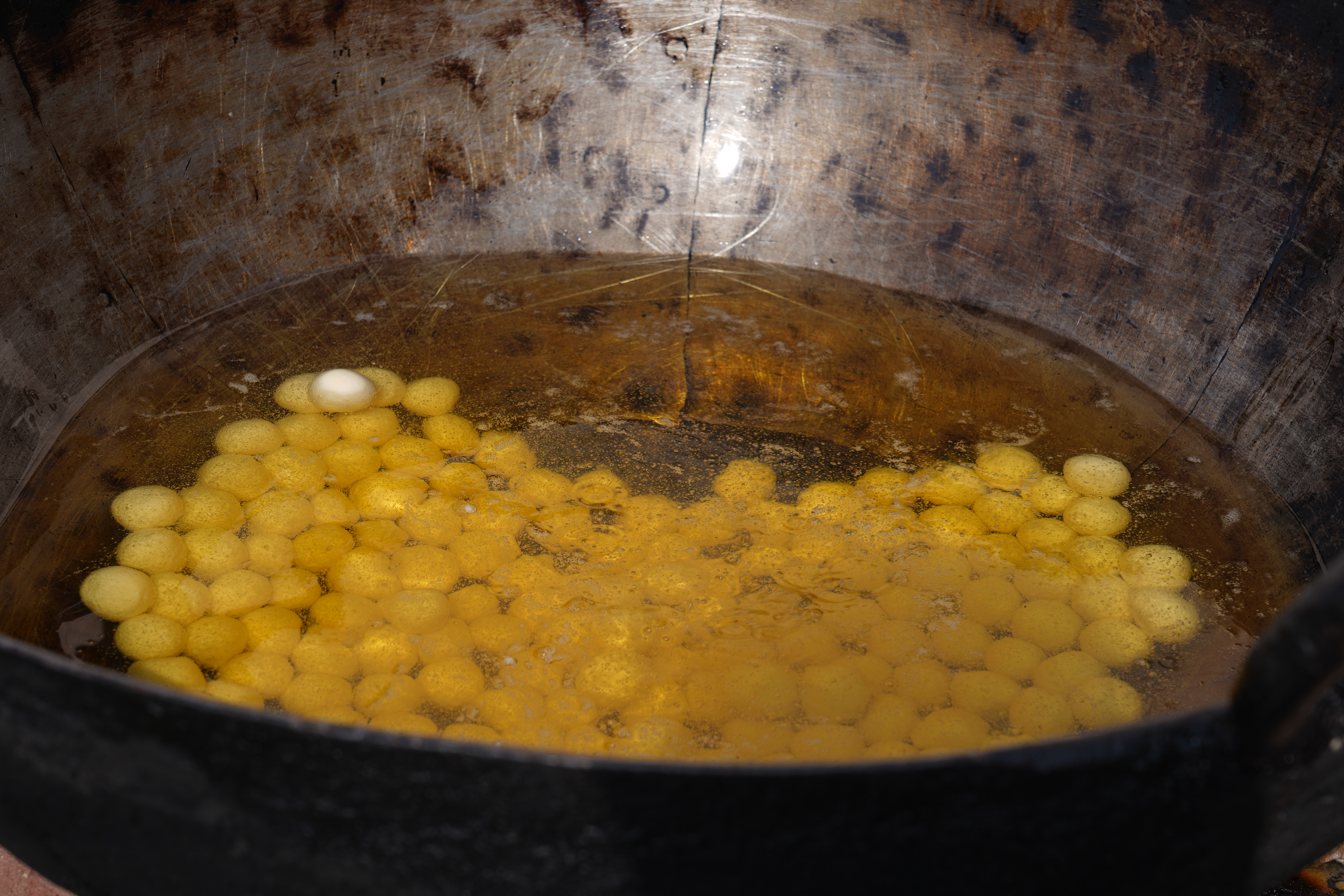
Karahi at an Indian wedding
