= Karahi =

Type of thick, circular, and deep pan

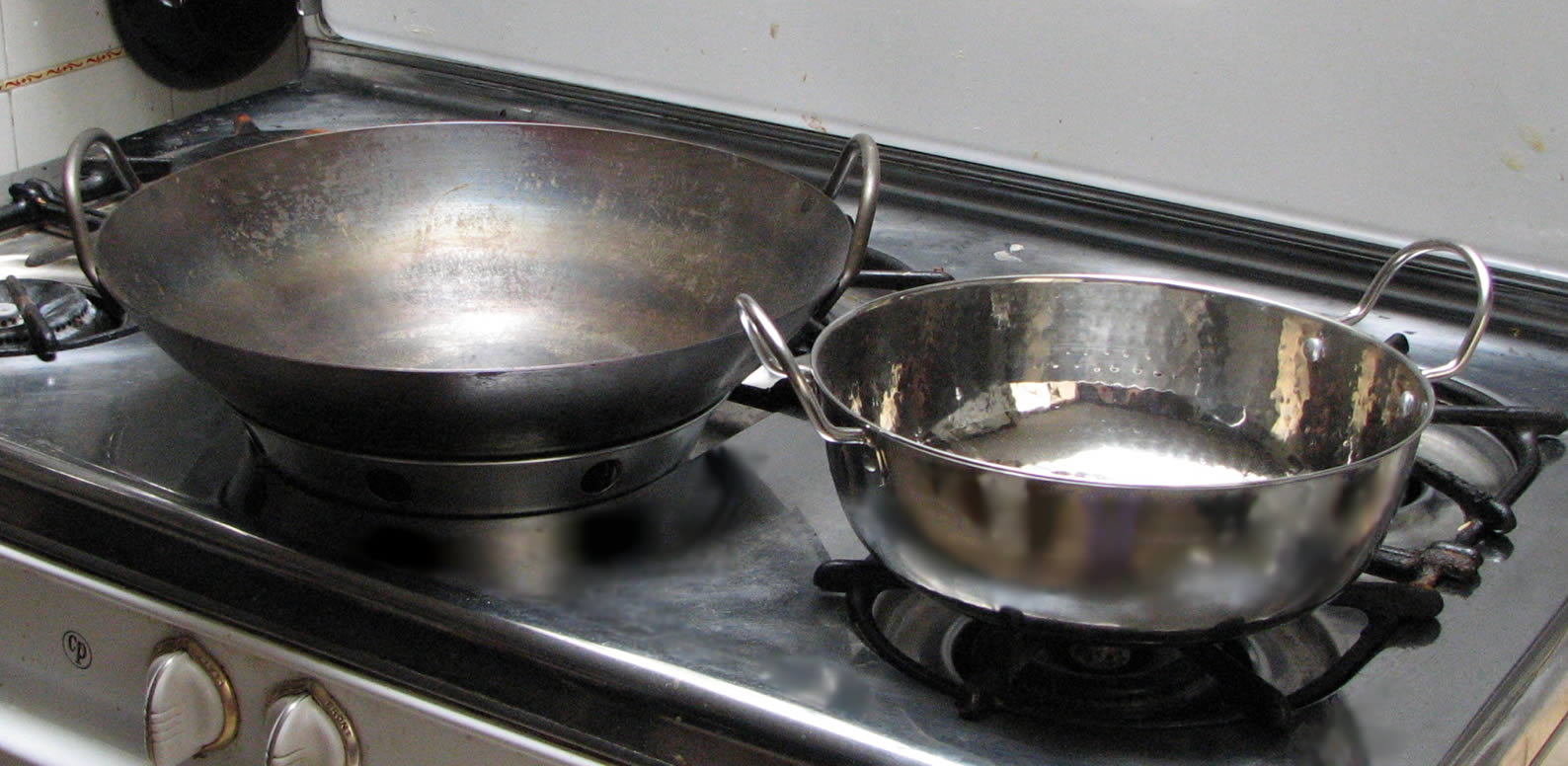
A wok sits next to a karahi on a Western-style stove. Note that the flat-bottomed karahi (right) sits on an ordinary burner cover, while the round-bottomed wok balances in a wok-ring. Karahi often have round (loop-shaped) handles.

A karahi (Note: (/kəˈraɪ/; also kadai, kerahi, karai, kadhi, kadahi, kadhai, korai, sarai, or cheena chatti)) is a type of thick, circular, and deep cooking pot, similar in shape to a wok, from the Indian subcontinent. It is used in Indian, Nepalese, Sri Lankan, Pakistani, Bangladeshi, Afghan, and Caribbean cuisines. Traditionally press-formed from mild steel sheets or made of wrought iron, a karahi resembles a wok with steeper sides. Today, they can be made of stainless steel, copper, and nonstick surfaces, both round and flat-bottomed, or of traditional materials. The word karahi emanates from karah, a bigger version of karahi traditionally used in the subcontinent for boiling milk and producing thick cream.

== History ==
Karahi or kadahi comes from the Prakrit word kataha, which is mentioned in texts like the Ramayana and Sushruta Samhita, and derives from Sanskrit kataha (meaning a frying pan, boiler, cauldron or saucepan). A karahi-like vessel is first mentioned in the Vedas as bharjanapatra.

== Use ==
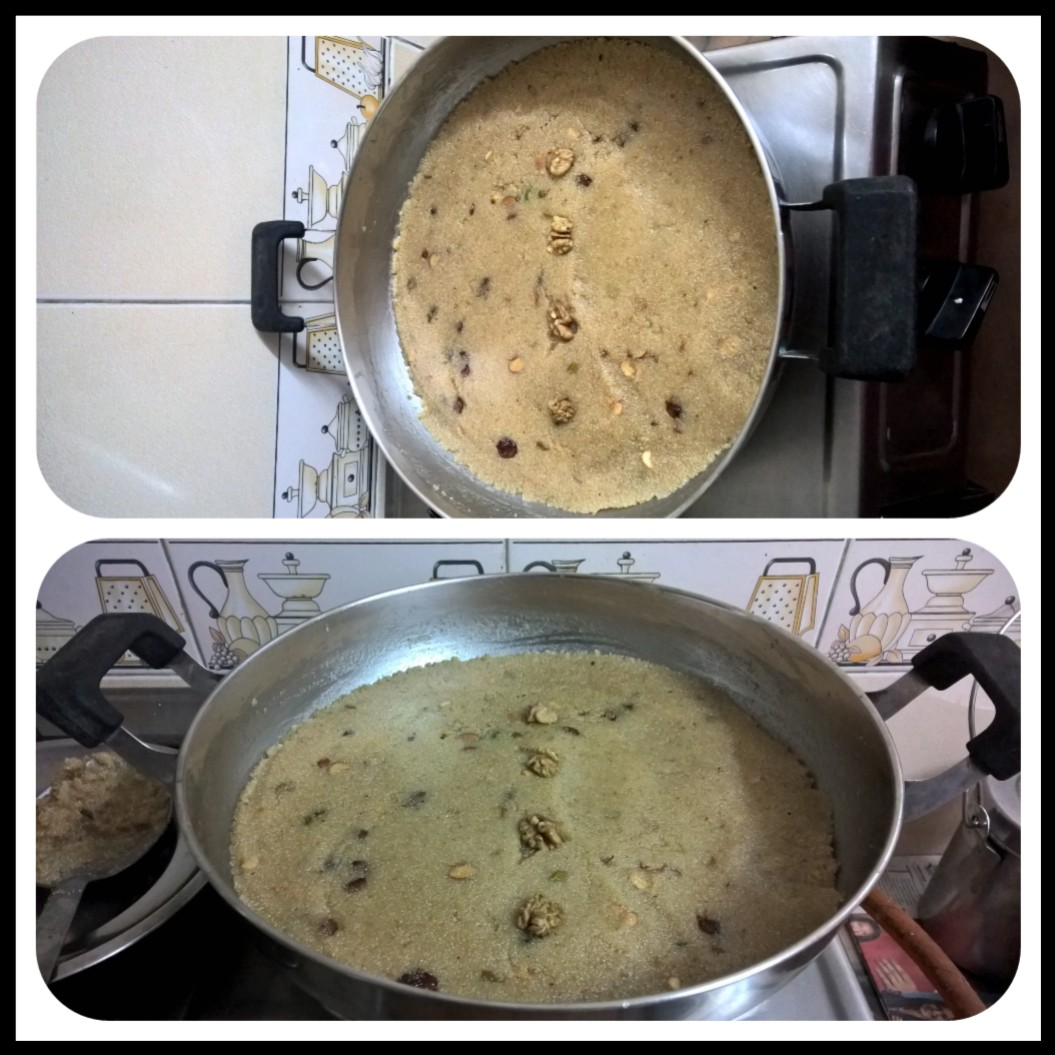
A Karahi being used to cook a type of halwa

A karahi serves for the shallow or deep-frying of meat, potatoes, sweets, and snacks such as samosa and fish and also for Indian papadams, but is most noted for the simmering of stews, which are often named karahi dishes after the utensil.

== Karahi dishes ==
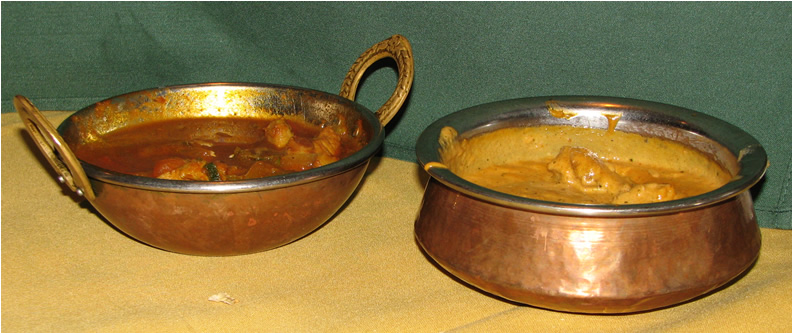
A small, decorative, copper-plated karahi (left) and handi (right) used to serve Indian food

Stews prepared in a karahi include chicken, beef, mutton, goat and lamb. Stews prepared with paneer or tofu are becoming increasingly popular amongst vegetarians.

An inverted karahi is used to cook rumali rotis.

== See also ==
- List of cooking vessels
