= Chicken karahi =

South Asian dish

Chicken Karahi
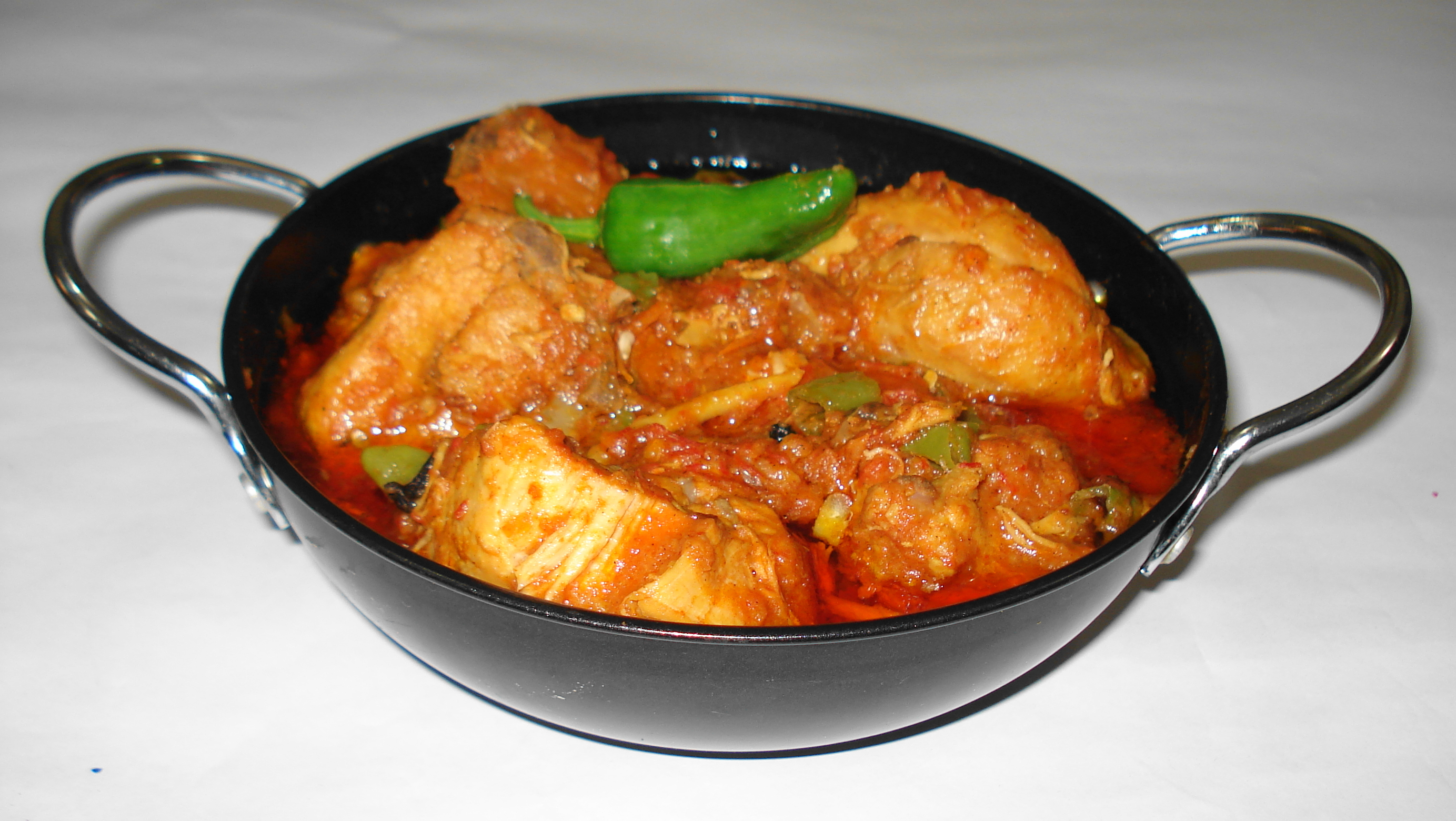
- Chicken Karahi
- Place of origin: Northwestern South Asia
- Region or state: Indian subcontinent
- Associated cuisine: Pakistan, India
- Main ingredients: Chicken

Chicken karahi, or chicken kadahi, is a chicken dish from South Asia. (Note: Though the romanization of the Hindi-Urdu karahi and kadahi is slightly different, it is the same word in Hindi-Urdu (कड़ाही / کڑاہی), with the same pronunciation. This is because in Devanagari, a nuqta is added to the letter ड, (ḍa) to produce the sound ड़ (ṛa) in the word कड़ाही, whereas in the Urdu script, the small t̤oʾe diacritic is added to the letter ر (rāʾ) to produce ڑ (ṛe) in the word کڑاہی. The Hindi-Urdu romanization of the dish is variously rendered as chicken karahi, chicken kadahi, chicken karai, or chicken kadai.) It is known as gosht karahi or gosht kadahi when prepared with goat or lamb meat instead of that of chicken. The dish is prepared in a karahi (a type of wok from the Indian subcontinent) and can take between 30 and 50 minutes to prepare and cook the dish. Ginger, garlic, tomatoes, green chilli and coriander are key to the flavor of the dish. What distinguishes chicken karahi from other curries from the region is that traditionally, it is cooked without onions in the base, and instead uses just tomatoes, ginger and garlic. It is usually served with naan, roti or rice. This dish is common in North Indian and Pakistani cuisine.

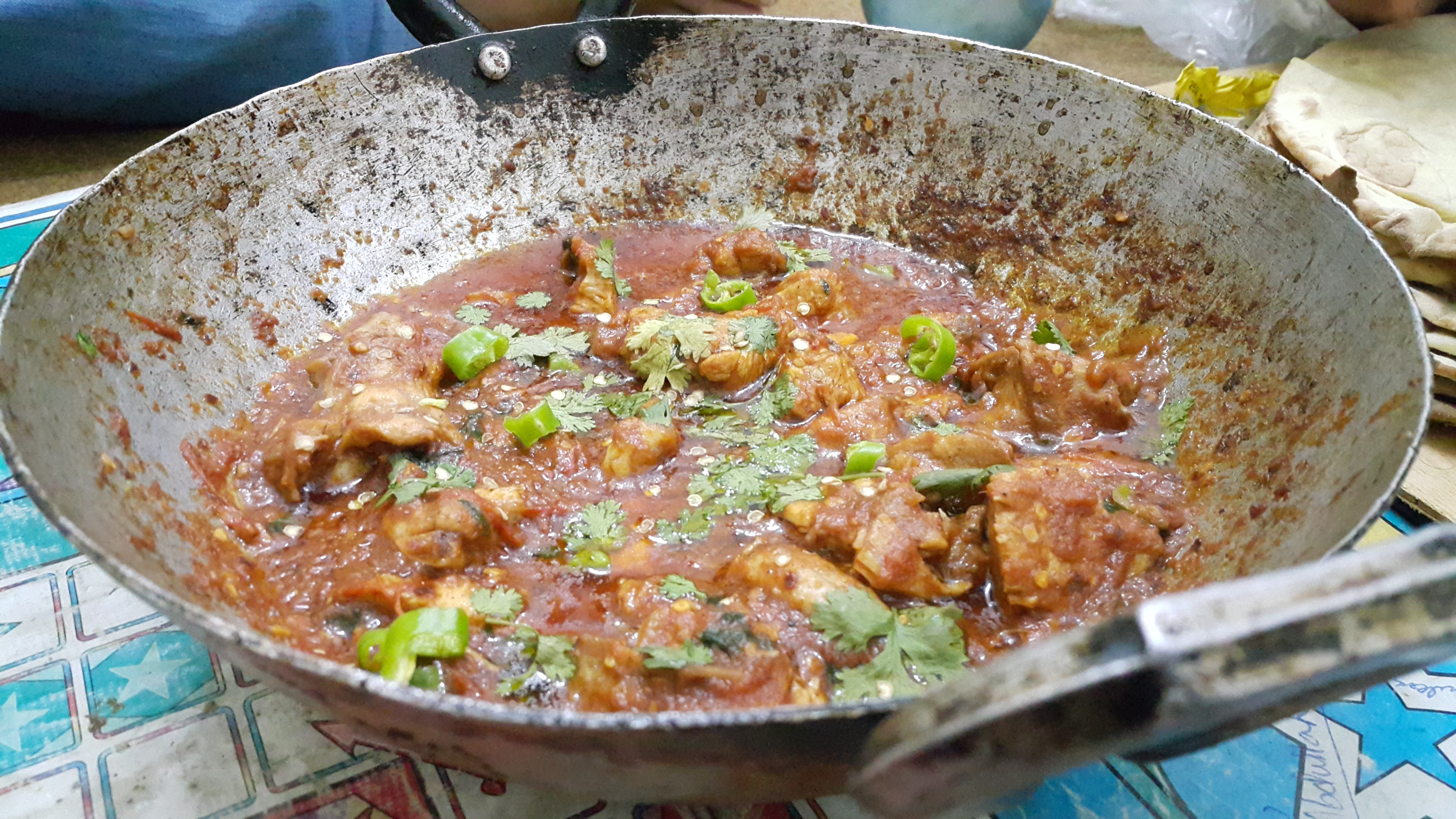
The dish being prepared in a large karahi, a pot of the Indian subcontinent.

== History ==
The Hindi-Urdu word karahi (a type of pot used in the Indian subcontinent) derives from the Prakrit word kataha (कटाह), being mentioned in the Sanskrit text Sushruta Samhita.

Chicken karahi (chicken kadahi) may originate in the Punjab region of South Asia, being famous in the city of Lahore. The dish's relative, gosht karahi (gosht kadahi) is thought to have originated in the colonial era North-West Frontier Province (now Khyber Pakhtunkhwa, Pakistan) with this dish being made of lamb or goat, rather than chicken.

The dish is a staple in menus of Indian and Pakistani restaurants in various parts of the world; the 'Bigger than Bollywood' experience at Hexham Library in Northumberland featured Indian cooks making chicken karahi with naan for British Film Institute tourists as early as 2002.
