= Fond =

Flavorful cooking liquid used in further cooking

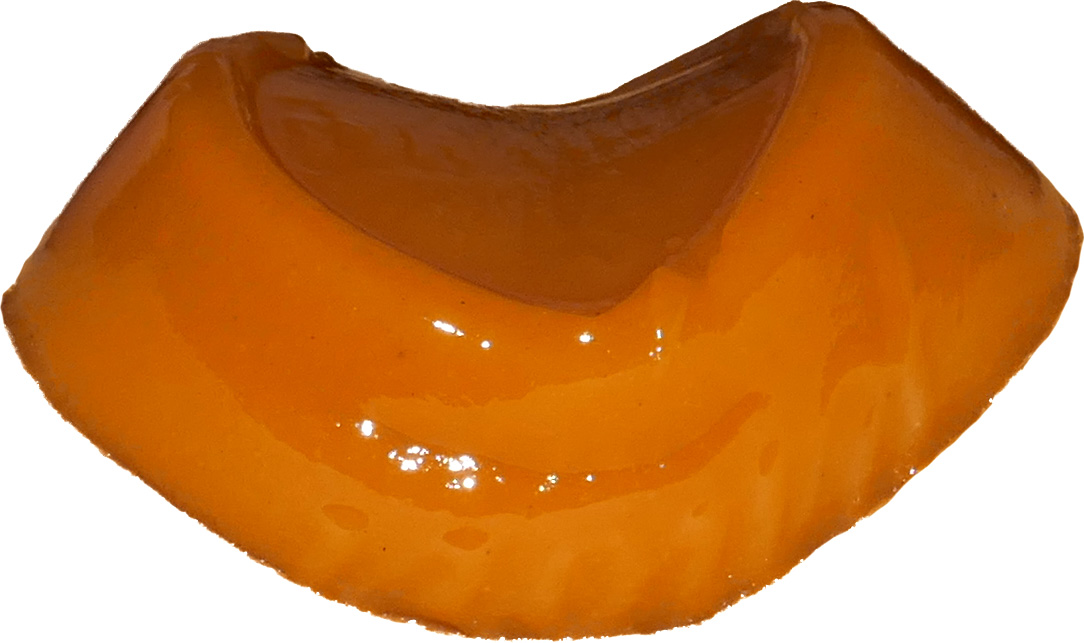
A fish fond with gelatinous structure

In the culinary arts, fond is a contraction of fonds de cuisine which is loosely described as "the foundation and working capital of the kitchen". In its native usage, fond refers to the sauce created by dissolving the flavorful solid bits of food (sucs) stuck to a pan or pot after cooking. In English-speaking countries, it often refers to the bits themselves. These bits are deglazed with a liquid in order to produce a stock, broth, or sauce. The name is an abbreviated form of the French word fondation (foundation in English).
