= Non-stick surface =

Coating that prevents sticking

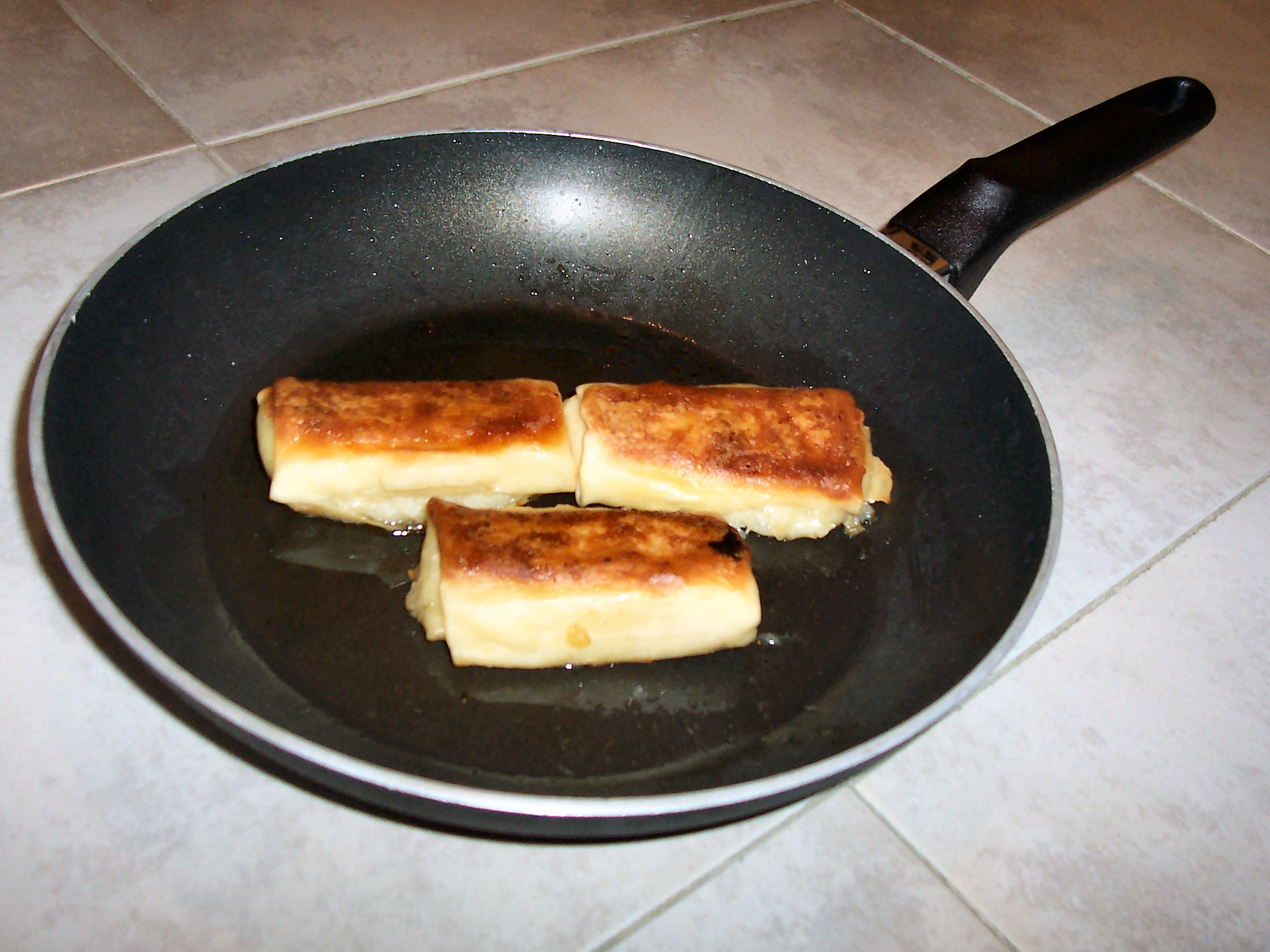
Food in a non-stick pan

A non-stick surface is engineered to reduce the ability of other materials to stick to it. Non-sticking cookware is a common application, where the non-stick coating allows food to brown without sticking to the pan. Non-stick is often used to refer to surfaces coated with polytetrafluoroethylene (PTFE), a well-known brand of which is Teflon. In the twenty-first century, other coatings have been marketed as non-stick, such as anodized aluminium, silica, enameled cast iron, and seasoned cookware.

== Types ==
=== Seasoning ===
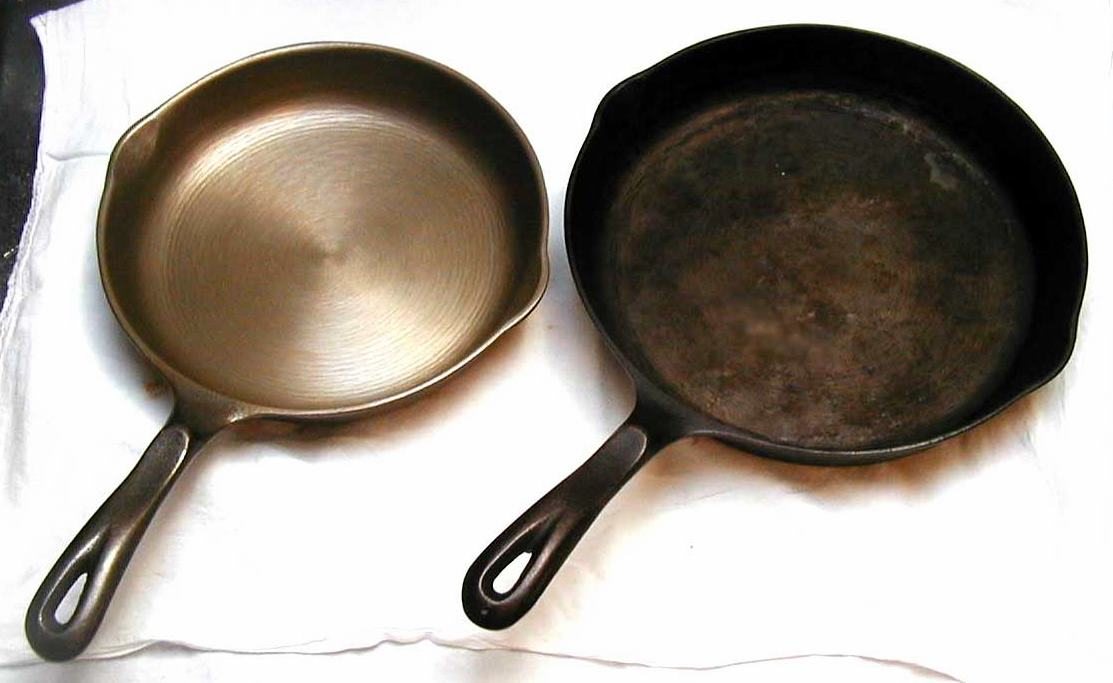
Cast iron skillets, before seasoning (left) and after several years of use (right)

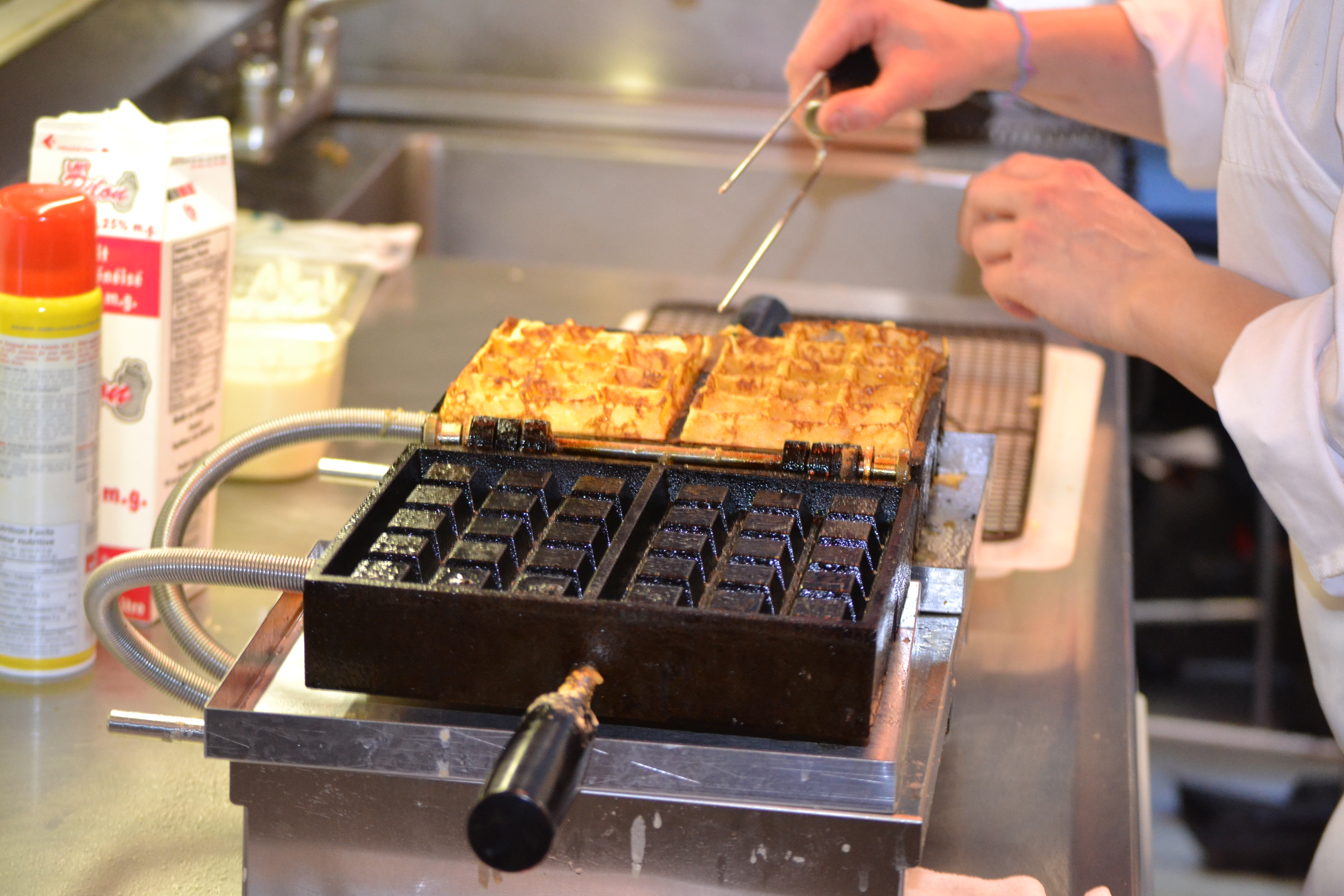
Commercial waffle iron requiring seasoning

Cast iron, carbon steel, stainless steel and cast aluminium cookware may be seasoned before cooking by applying a fat to the surface and heating it to polymerize it. This produces a dry, hard, smooth, hydrophobic coating, which is non-stick when food is cooked with a small amount of cooking oil or fat.

=== Fluoropolymer ===
The modern non-stick pans were made using a coating of Teflon (polytetrafluoroethylene or PTFE). PTFE was invented serendipitously by Roy Plunkett in 1938, while working for a joint venture of the DuPont company. The substance was found to have several unique properties, including very good corrosion-resistance and the lowest coefficient of friction of any substance yet manufactured. PTFE was first used to make seals resistant to the uranium hexafluoride gas used in development of the atomic bomb during World War II, and was regarded as a military secret. Dupont registered the Teflon trademark in 1944 and soon began planning for post-war commercial use of the new product.

By 1951 Dupont had developed applications for Teflon in commercial bread and cookie-making; however, the company avoided the market for consumer cookware due to potential problems associated with release of toxic gases if stove-top pans were overheated in inadequately ventilated spaces. While working at DuPont, John Gilbert was asked to evaluate a newly developed material called Teflon. His experiments using the fluorinated polymer as a surface coating for pots and pans helped usher in a revolution in non-stick cookware.

A few years later, a French engineer had begun coating his fishing gear with Teflon to prevent tangles. His wife Colette suggested using the same method to coat her cooking pans. The idea was successful and a French patent was granted for the process in 1954. The Tefal company was formed in 1956 to manufacture non-stick pans.

==== PTFE (Teflon) ====
Polytetrafluoroethylene (PTFE) is a synthetic fluoropolymer used in various applications including non-stick coatings. Teflon is a brand of PTFE, often used as a generic term for PTFE. The metallic substrate is roughened by abrasive blasting, then sometimes electric-arc sprayed with stainless steel. The irregular surface promotes adhesion of the PTFE and also resists abrasion of the PTFE. Then one to seven layers of PTFE are sprayed or rolled on. The number and thickness of the layers and quality of the material determine the quality of the non-stick coating, with more layers being better. Better-quality coatings are more durable, and less likely to peel and flake, and keep their non-stick properties for longer. Any PTFE-based coating will rapidly lose its non-stick properties if overheated; all manufacturers recommend that temperatures be kept below, typically, 260 °C (500 °F).

Utensils used with PTFE-coated pans can scratch the coating if the utensils are harder than the coating; this can be prevented by using non-metallic (usually plastic or wood) cooking tools.

===== Health concerns =====
When pans are overheated beyond approximately 260°C (500°F) the PTFE coating begins to dissociate, releasing hydrofluoric acid and a variety of organofluorine compounds which can cause polymer fume fever in humans and can be lethal to birds. Concerns have been raised over the possible negative effects of using PTFE-coated cooking pans.

Processing of PTFE in the past used to include PFOA as an emulsifier; however, PFOA is a persistent organic pollutant and poses both environmental and health concerns, and is now being phased out of use in PTFE processing.

PFOA is now replaced by the GenX product manufactured by the DuPont spin-off Chemours, which seems to pose similar health issues as the now banned PFOA.

==== Xylan ====
Xylan is a trademarked fluoropolymer‑based industrial coating, most commonly used in non-stick cookware. Xylan is formulated as a composite system that typically combines one or more fluoropolymers—such as PTFE, perfluoroalkoxy alkane (PFA), and fluorinated ethylene propylene (FEP)—with specialized binder resins to improve adhesion and wear resistance.

==== Other ====
Various other proprietary fluoropolymer‑based coatings exist, such as Starflon by Tramontina which is a nonstick coating marketed as "PFAS free" but still developed using PTFE.

=== Ceramic ===
Not all non-stick pans use Teflon; other non-stick coatings have become available. For example, a mixture of titanium and ceramic can be sandblasted onto the pan surface, and then fired at 2,000 °C (3,630 °F) to produce a non-stick ceramic coating.

Ceramic nonstick pans use a finish of silica (silicon dioxide) to prevent sticking. It is applied using a sol-gel process without the use of PFAS. The coating layer of Ceramic nonstick pans starts to break down at about 370 °C (700 °F). The coating layer of PTFE cookware starts to break down when heated to 260 °C.

With the EPA imposing stricter limits on the use of PFAS, some companies are voluntarily replacing their PTFE cookware with ceramic options.

==== Silica ====
From 2007 Silica coated surfaces, via the Sol–gel process, appeared on cookware, GreenPan, and AkzoNobel with Tramontina, pioneering early commercial formulations.

=== Other ===
==== Superhydrophobic coating ====
A superhydrophobic coating is a thin surface layer that repels water. It is made from superhydrophobic (ultrahydrophobicity) materials. Droplets hitting this kind of coating can fully rebound. Generally speaking, superhydrophobic coatings are made from composite materials where one component provides the roughness and the other provides low surface energy.

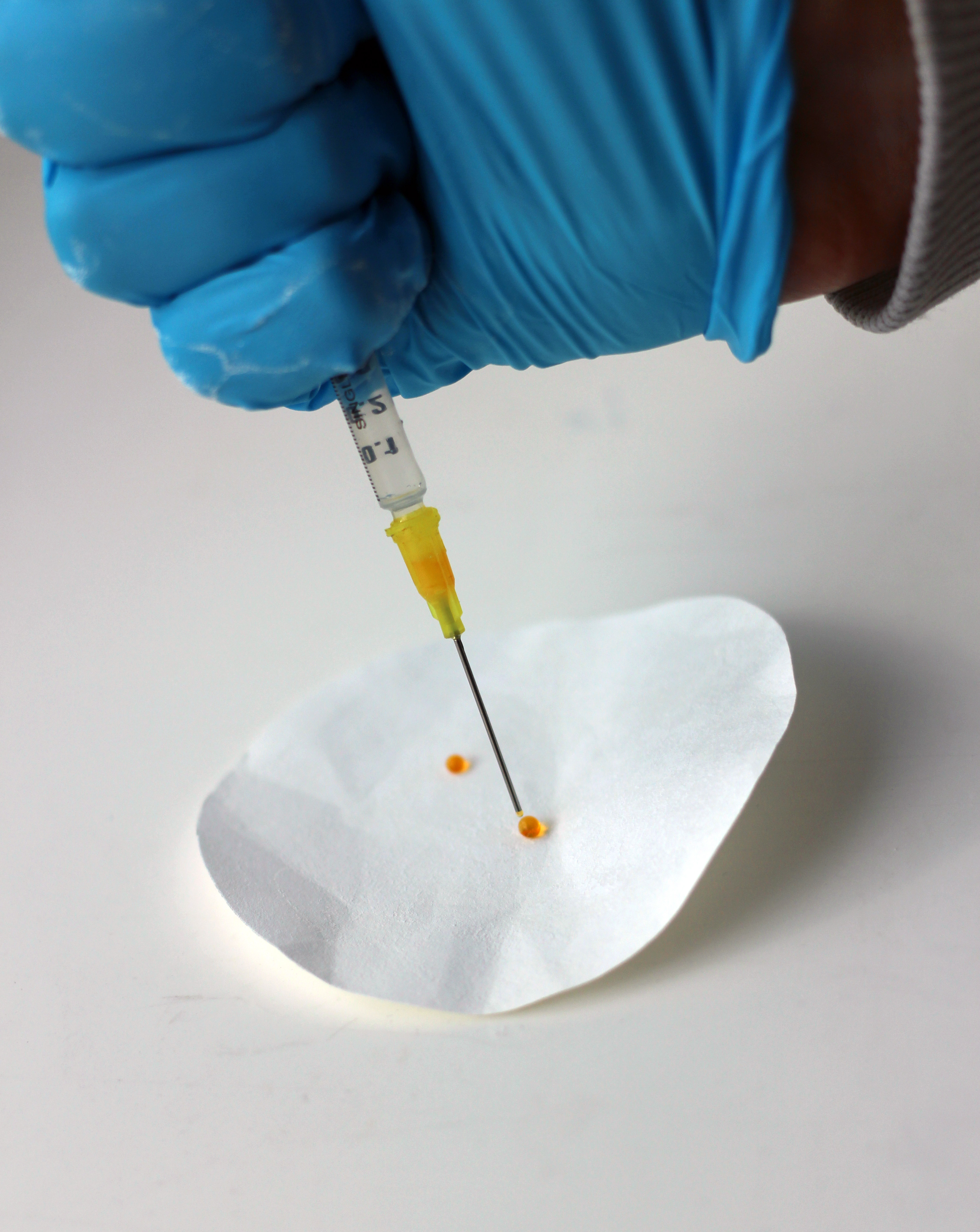
This image shows highly absorbent filter paper coated with a super-hydrophobic paint developed at University College London. This repels water (which has been dyed orange for greater contrast)

==== Liquid-impregnated surface ====
A liquid-impregnated surface consists of two distinct layers. The first is a highly textured or porous substrate with features spaced sufficiently close to stably contain the second layer which is an impregnating liquid that fills in the spaces between the features. The liquid must have a surface energy well-matched to the substrate in order to form a stable film. These surfaces bioimitate the carnivorous Venezuelan pitcher plant, which uses microscale hairs to create a water slide that causes ants to slip to their death. Slippery surfaces are finding applications in commercial products, anti-fouling surfaces, anti-icing and biofilm-resistant medical devices.

==== Diamond Surface (Hydrogen-Terminated) ====
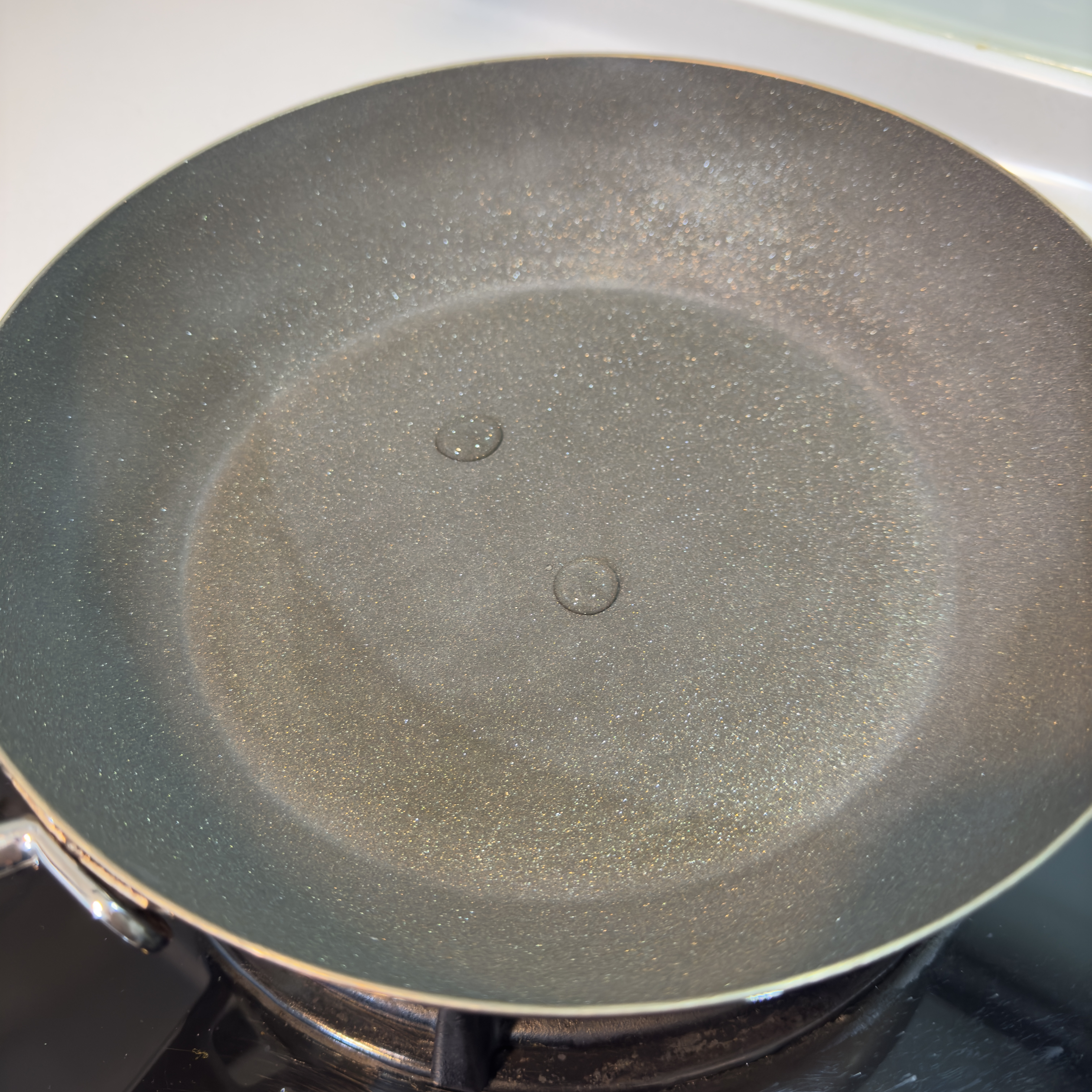
Diamond surface non-stick frying pan

Diamond surfaces with hydrogen termination are hydrophobic, making them suitable for non-stick applications. Diamond's high thermal conductivity enables quick and even heat distribution.

== Culinary uses and limitations ==
With other types of pans, some oil or fat is required to prevent hot food from sticking to the pan's surface. Food does not have the same tendency to stick to a non-stick surface; pans can be used with less, or no oil, and are easier to clean as residues do not stick to the surface.

According to writer Tony Polombo, pans that are not non-stick are better for producing pan gravy, because the fond (the caramelized drippings that stick to the pan when meat is cooked) sticks to them, and can be turned into pan gravy by deglazing them—dissolving them in liquid.

== See also ==
- Cooking spray
- Aluminium magnesium boride
- Forever chemicals
