= Searing =

Cooking technique

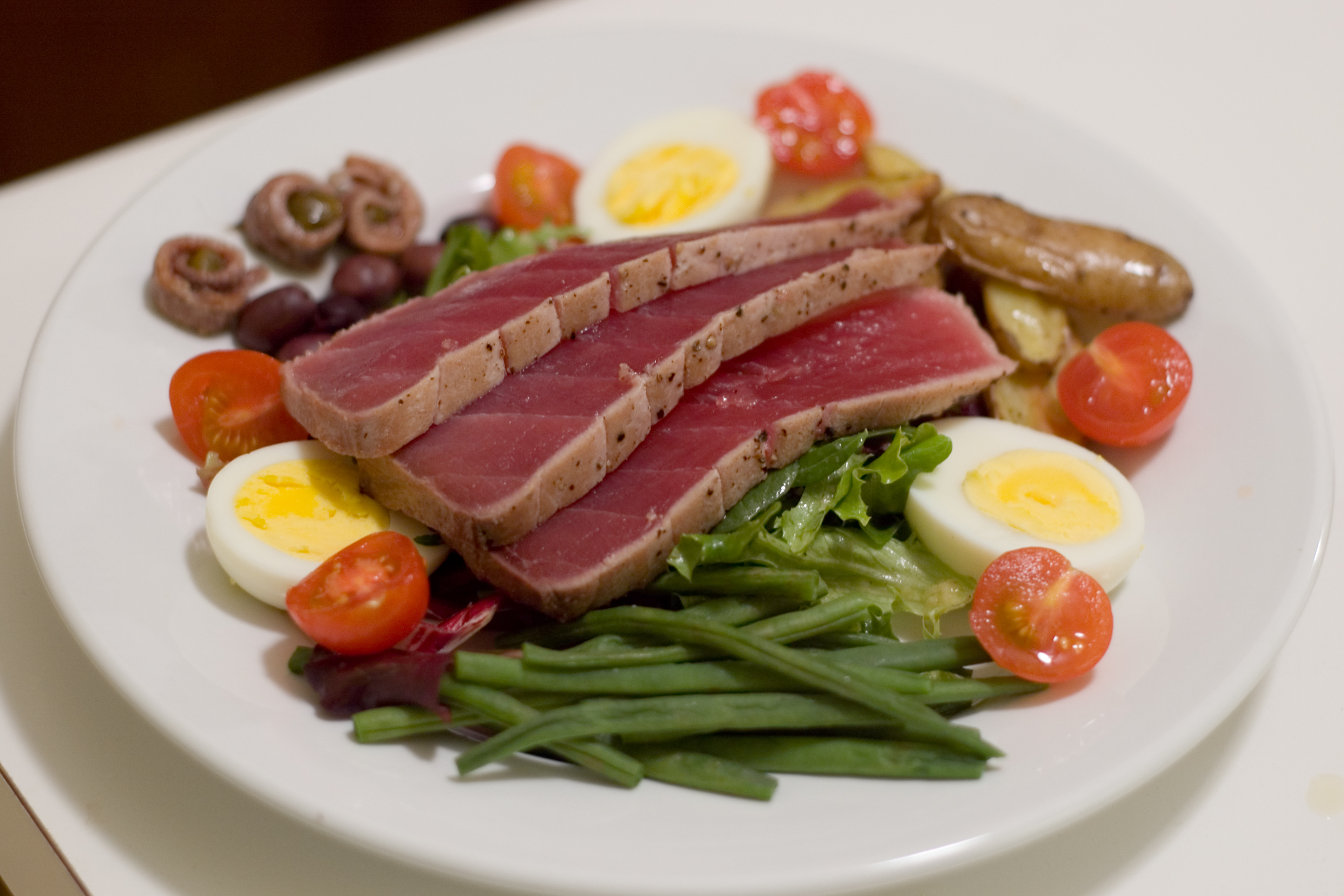
Seared tuna

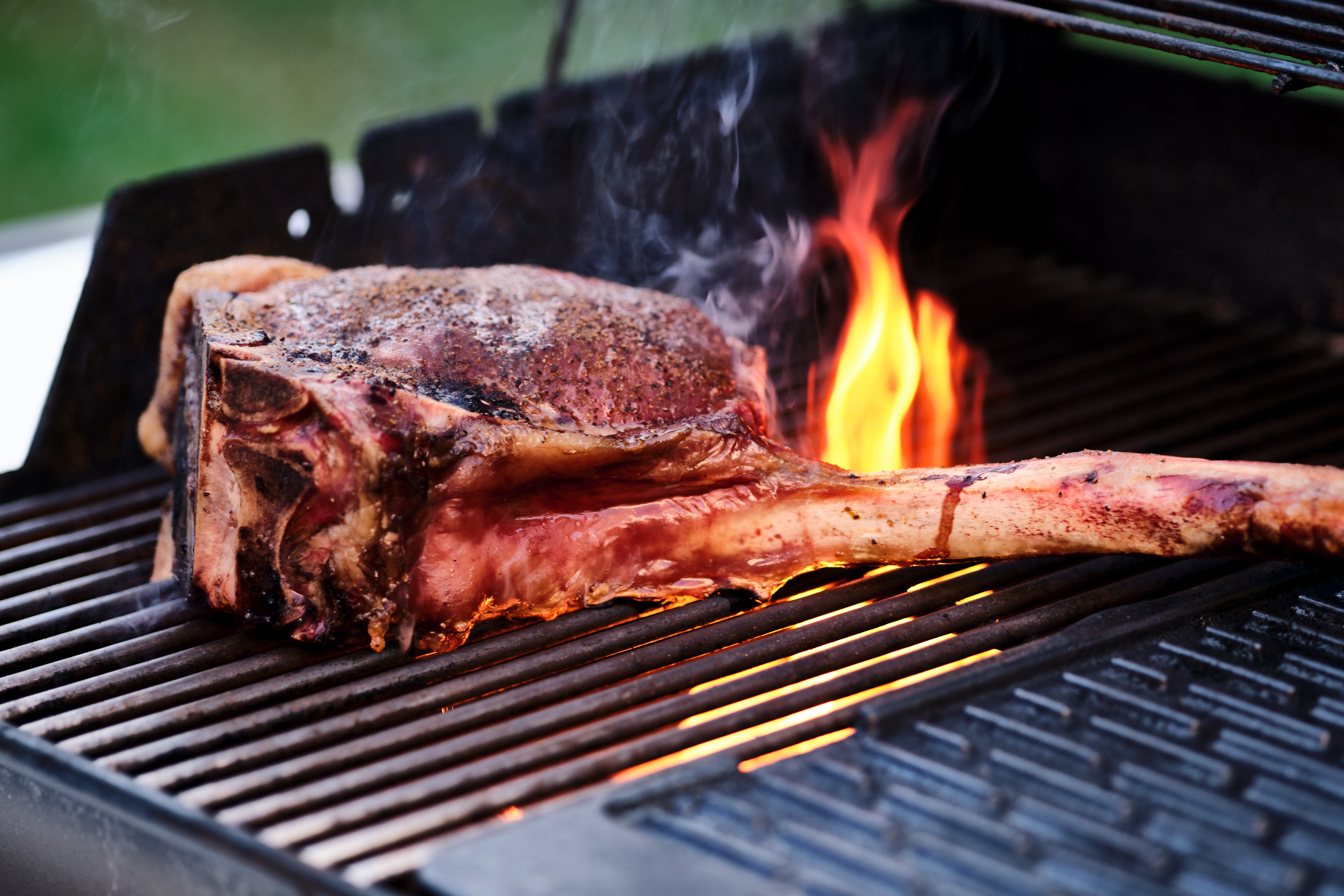
Searing a steak after smoking for 2 hours

Searing or pan searing is a technique used in grilling, baking, braising, roasting, sautéing, and the like, in which the surface of the food (usually meat such as beef, poultry, pork, or seafood) is cooked at high temperature until a browned crust forms. Similar techniques, such as browning and blackening, are typically used to sear all sides of a particular piece of meat, fish, poultry, etc. before finishing it in the oven. To obtain the desired brown or black crust, the meat surface must exceed 150 °C (300 °F), so searing requires the meat surface be free of water, which boils at around 100 °C (212 °F).

Although often said to "lock in the moisture" or "seal in the juices", in fact, searing results in a greater loss of moisture than cooking to the same internal temperature without searing. Nonetheless, it remains an essential technique in cooking meat for several reasons:

- The browning creates desirable flavors through the Maillard reaction.
- The appearance of the food is usually improved with a well-browned crust.
- The contrast in taste and texture between the crust and the interior makes the food more interesting.

Searing does not cause caramelization, which affects only sugars, or simple carbohydrates; the Maillard reaction involves reactions between amino acids and some sugars.

Typically in grilling, the food will be seared over very high heat and then moved to a lower-temperature area of the grill to finish cooking. In braising, the seared surface flavors and colors the cooking liquid.

== Reverse searing ==
In reverse searing, the order of cooking is inverted. First the item to be cooked, typically a steak, is cooked at low heat in an oven until the center reaches the desired temperature; then the outside is cooked on a pan or other surface at a high temperature to achieve the Maillard reaction. This technique is typically recommended for thicker pieces of meat,1–1.5 in (25–38 mm) allowing for consistent internal cooking temperature with only the outer portion becoming seared. This method aims to reduce the grey band on steaks to achieve a wall-to-wall pink center.

== Sealing in the juices ==
The belief that searing meat "seals in the juices" is widespread and still often repeated. This theory was first put forth by Liebig in his book Researches on the Chemistry of Food around 1850. Liebig reasoned that substances found in muscle tissue must be essential to human nutrition though we know today that the "water-soluble components are minor products of muscle metabolism and nutritionally negligible."

The notion was embraced by contemporary cooks and authors, including Escoffier. It is typically mentioned for larger cuts, especially steaks and chops, of non-poultry meats such as beef, pork, lamb and tuna.

Experiments to test the theory were carried out as early as the 1930s and found that the seared roasts lost the same amount of moisture or more. Generally more liquid is lost, since searing exposes the meat to higher temperatures that destroy more cells, in turn releasing more liquid.

Moisture in liquid and vapor form continues to escape from a seared piece of meat. For this reason, searing is sometimes done at the end of the cooking process to gain the flavor benefits of the Maillard reaction, as well as the benefits of cooking for a greater duration with more moistness.
