= Seasoning (cookware) =

Process of treating the surface of cooking vessels with oil

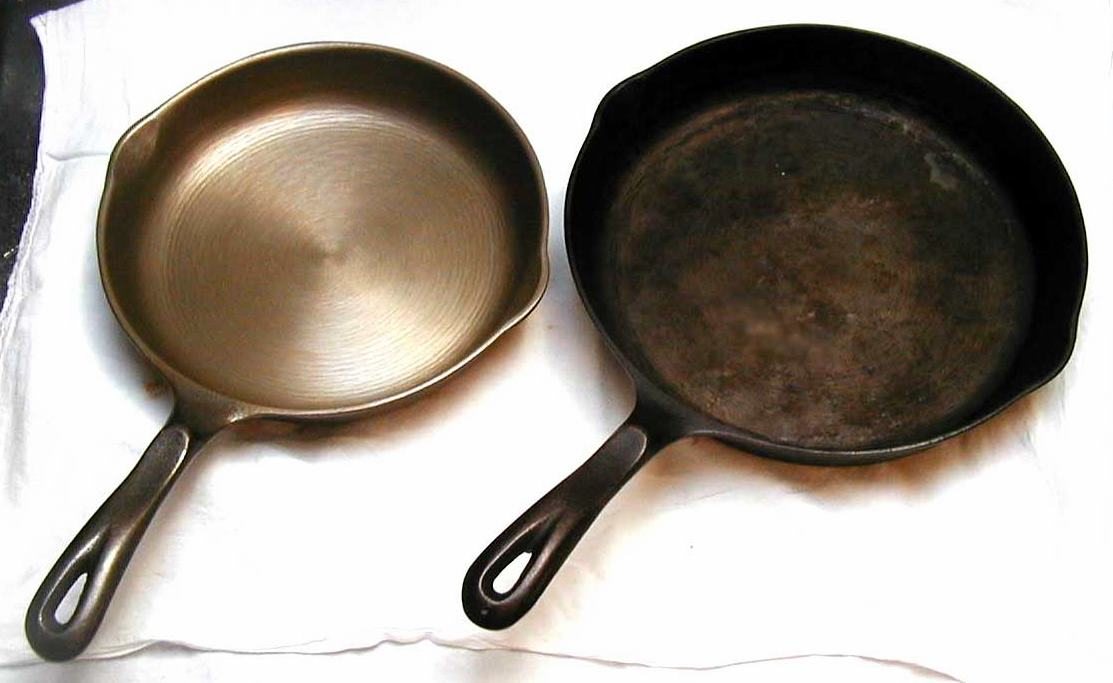
Cast iron skillets, before seasoning (left) and after several years of use (right)

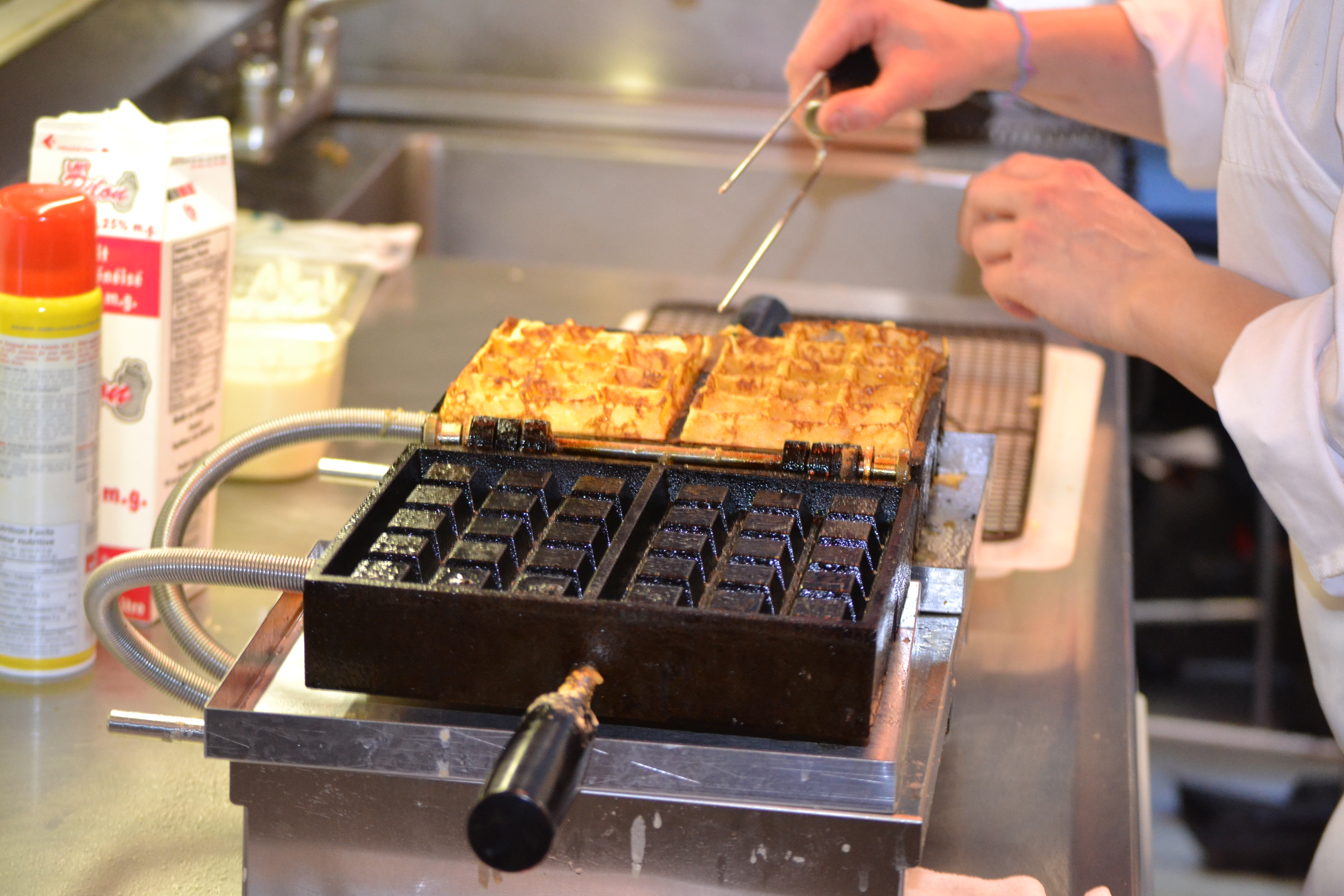
A commercial waffle iron showing its seasoned cooking surface (the dark brown surface coating)

Seasoning is the process of coating the surface of cookware with fat which is heated in order to produce a corrosion-resistant layer of polymerized fat. It is required for raw cast-iron cookware and carbon steel, which otherwise rust rapidly in use, but is also used for many other types of cookware. An advantage of seasoning is that it helps prevent food sticking.

Some cast-iron and carbon steel cookware is pre-seasoned by manufacturers to protect the pan from oxidation (rust), but will need to be further seasoned by the end-users for the cookware to become ready for best nonstick cooking results. To form a strong seasoning, the raw iron item is thoroughly cleaned, coated in a very thin layer of unsaturated fat or oil, and then heated until the bioplastic layer forms, and left to completely cool. Multiple layers are required for the best long-term results.

Stainless steel and aluminium cookware do not require protection from corrosion, but seasoning reduces sticking, and can help with browning as the seasoning coating has high thermal emissivity. Other cookware surfaces are generally not seasoned.

A seasoned surface is hydrophobic and highly attractive to oils and fats used for cooking. These form a layer that prevents foods, which typically contain water, from touching and cooking onto the hydrophilic metallic cooking surface underneath. These properties are useful when frying, roasting and baking.

== Methods of seasoning ==
Food sticks easily to a bare metal cooking surface; it must either be oiled or seasoned before use. The coating known as seasoning is formed by a process of repeatedly layering extremely thin coats of oil on the cookware and oxidizing each layer with medium-high heat for a time. This process is known as "seasoning"; the color of the coating is commonly known as its "patina" - the base coat will darken with use.

To season cookware (e.g., to season a new pan, or to replace damaged seasoning on an old pan), the following is a typical process: First the cookware is thoroughly cleaned to remove old seasoning, manufacturing residues or a possible manufacturer-applied anti corrosion coating and to expose the bare metal. If it is not pre-seasoned, a new cast-iron skillet or dutch oven typically comes from the manufacturer with a protective coating of wax or shellac; otherwise it would rust. This needs to be removed before the cookware is used. An initial scouring with hot soapy water will usually remove the protective coating. Alternatively, for a wok, it is common to burn off the coating over high heat (outside or under a vent hood) to expose the bare metal surface. For already-used cookware that is to be re-seasoned, the cleaning process can be more complex. Existing seasoning and buildup are stripped with oven cleaner or lye baths, or burned off in a campfire or self-cleaning oven. Rust removal involves vinegar baths or electrolysis.

Then several times the following is performed:

1. Applying a very thin layer of animal fat or cooking oil (ranging from vegetable oil to lard, including many common food-grade oils).
2. Polishing most of it off so that barely any remains or alternatively use a seasoning paste
3. Heat the cookware to just below or just above the smoke point to generate a layer of seasoning.

The precise details of the seasoning process differ from one source to another, and there is much disagreement regarding the correct oil to use. There is also no clear consensus about the best temperature and duration. Lodge Manufacturing uses a proprietary soybean blend in their base coats as stated on their website, but states that all oils and fats can be used. The temperature recommended for seasoning varies from high temperatures above 260 °C (500 °F) to temperatures below 150 °C (302 °F).

Seasoning a cast-iron or carbon steel wok is a common process in Asia and Asian-American culture. While the vegetable oil method of seasoning is also used in Asia, a traditional process for seasoning also includes the use of Chinese chives or scallions as part of the process.

== Surface chemistry ==
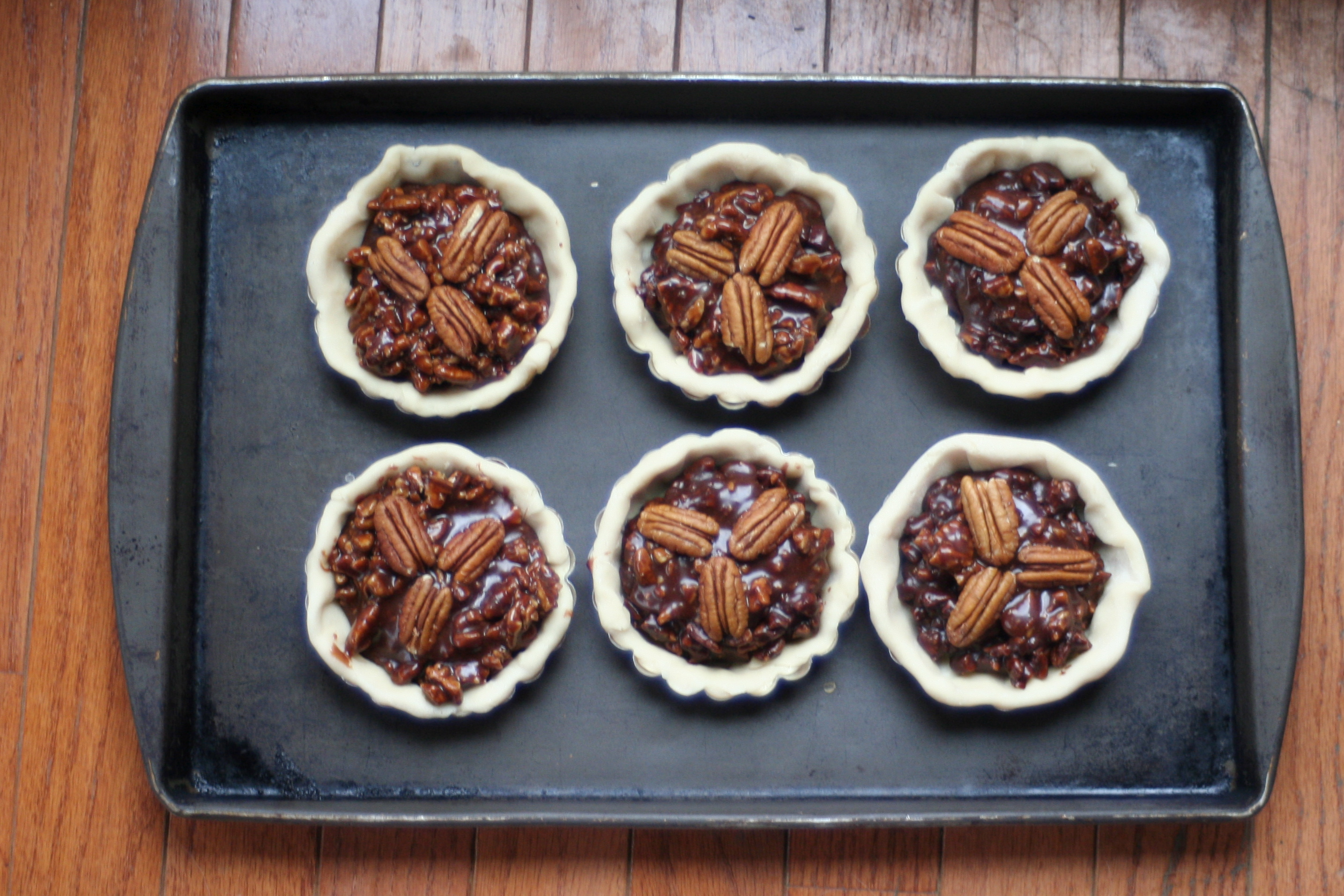
A well seasoned baking tray

In conventional seasoning, the oil or fat is converted into a hard surface at or above the high temperatures used for cooking, analogous to the reaction of drying oils. When oils or fats are heated, multiple degradation reactions occur, including decomposition, autoxidation, thermal oxidation, polymerization, and cyclization. Among other processes at high temperatures triglycerides in the oil break down into glycerol and fatty acids. The soluble glycerol then burns off creating (toxic) smoke while the fatty acids in the oil polymerise and harden.

Often cookware's seasoning is uneven, and over time it will spread to the whole item. Heating the cookware (such as in a hot oven or on a stovetop) facilitates the oxidation of the iron; the fats and/or oils protect the metal from contact with the air during the reaction, which would otherwise cause rust to form. Some cast iron users advocate heating the cookware slightly before applying the fat or oil to ensure it is completely dry.

The seasoned surface is hydrophobic and highly attractive to oils and fats used for cooking (oleophilic). These form a layer that prevents foods, which typically contain water, from touching and cooking on to the hydrophilic metallic cooking surface underneath.

The seasoned surface will deteriorate at the temperature where the coating breaks down. This is typically higher than the smoke point of the original oils and fats used to season the cookware. Thus old seasoning can be removed at a sufficiently high temperature (~500 °C), as found in oven self-cleaning cycles.

=== High-temperature seasoning ===
Some Chinese cookware is seasoned at a much higher temperature than conventional seasoning at 450 °C. More akin to bluing, this type of seasoning mainly involves a chemical change of the iron pan itself and not the oil. When beef tallow is heated at this temperature, it evaporates on the iron surface and increases the partial pressure of O_{2} (oxygen gas) on the pot surface. This transport of oxygen encourages the formation of Fe_{3}O_{4} nanoballs. The surface formed is broadly speaking hydrophobic and oleophilic, but is more versatile in that it temporarily turns hydrophilic on contact with high-water ingredients.

== Care ==
Some food writers advise against using seasoned pans and Dutch ovens to cook foods containing tomatoes, vinegar, or other acidic ingredients because these foods would eventually remove the protective layer created during the seasoning process. Tests conducted by America's Test Kitchen found that, while cooking a highly acidic tomato sauce for over 30 minutes produced a metallic taste, cooking acidic food in a well-seasoned pan for a short time is unlikely to have negative consequences.

Cast iron pots are best suited to cook food high in oil or fat, such as chicken, bacon, or sausage, or used for deep frying. Cleaning (except prior to seasoning) is often carried out without the use of detergent. Some cookbook authors recommend only wiping seasoned cookware clean after each use or using other cleaning methods such as a salt scrub or boiling water. The protective layer itself is not very susceptible to soaps, and many users do briefly use detergents and soaps. However, cast iron is very prone to rust, and the protective layer may have pinholes, so soaking for long periods is contraindicated as the layer may start to flake off.

Unlike commercial non-stick coatings such as Teflon, with which metal cooking utensils are not used because they damage the surface, seasoned surfaces tend to be self-reforming, so they allow the use of such utensils. These are of course much more effective in scraping off food than the softer utensils used with non-stick pans.

== Bluing ==
In the process of bluing, an oxidizing chemical reaction on an iron surface selectively forms magnetite (Fe_{3}O_{4}), the black oxide of iron (as opposed to rust, the red oxide of iron (Fe_{2}O_{3})). Black oxide provides some protection against corrosion if also treated with a water-displacing oil to reduce wetting and galvanic action. Bluing is often used with carbon steel and cast iron pans in conjunction with seasoning.

== See also ==
- Non-stick pan
