= Deglazing (cooking) =

Cooking technique to create a sauce

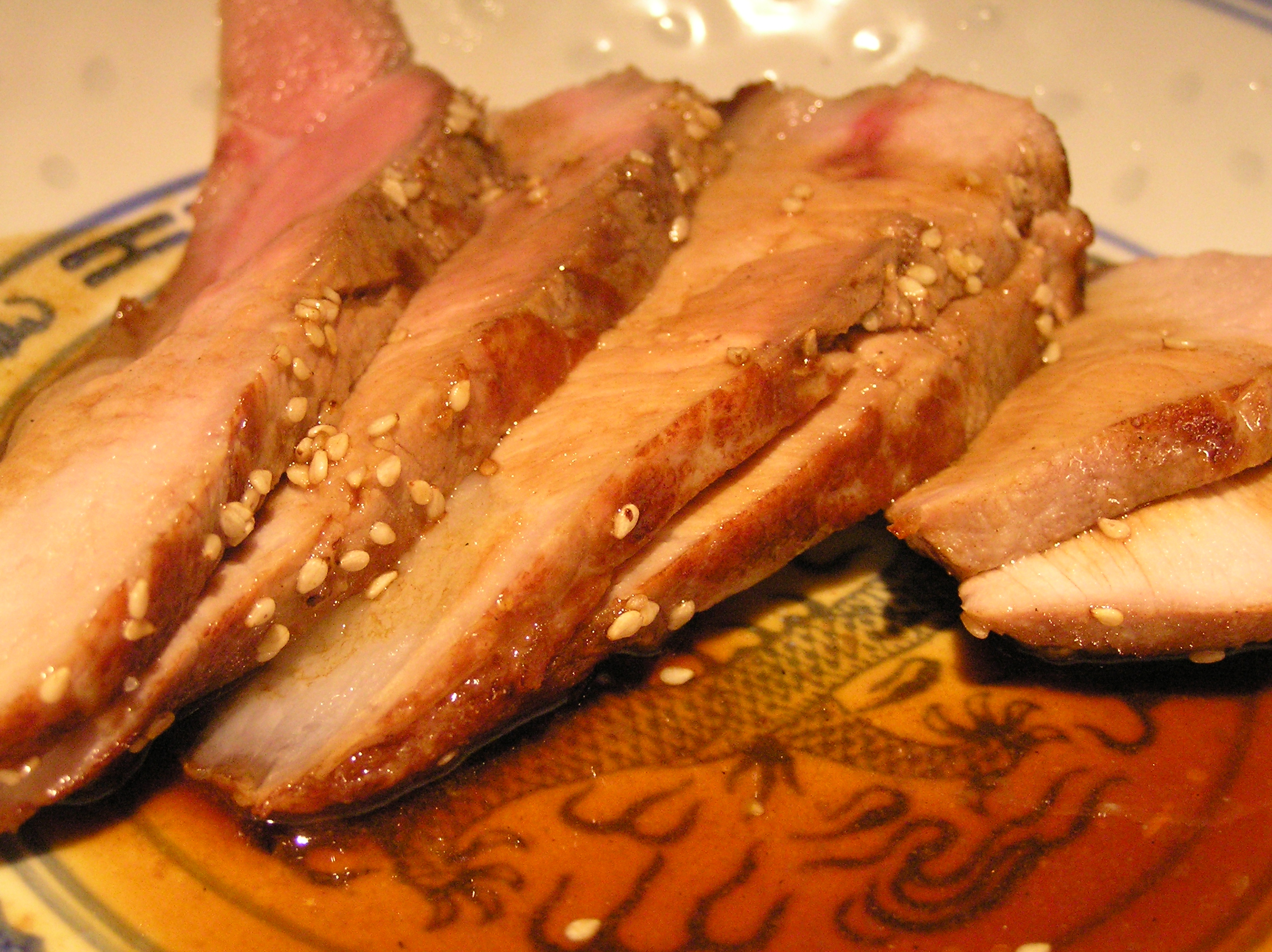
Pork sirloin chop with cider pan sauce

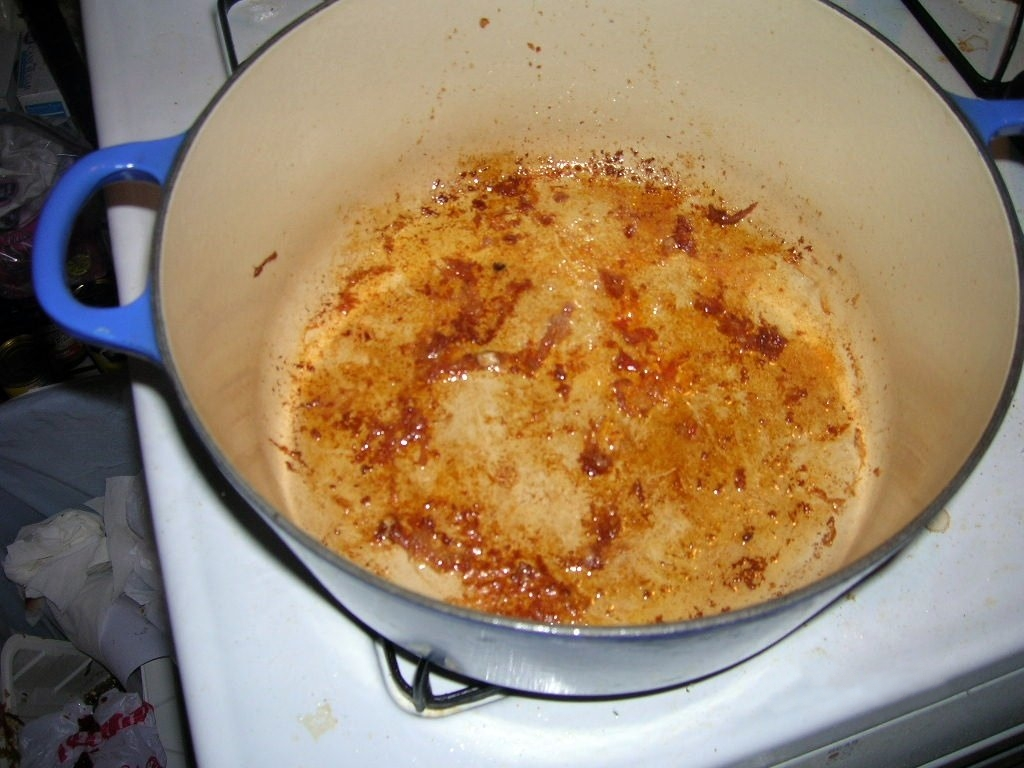
Sucs left in a white enamel pot after browning pork

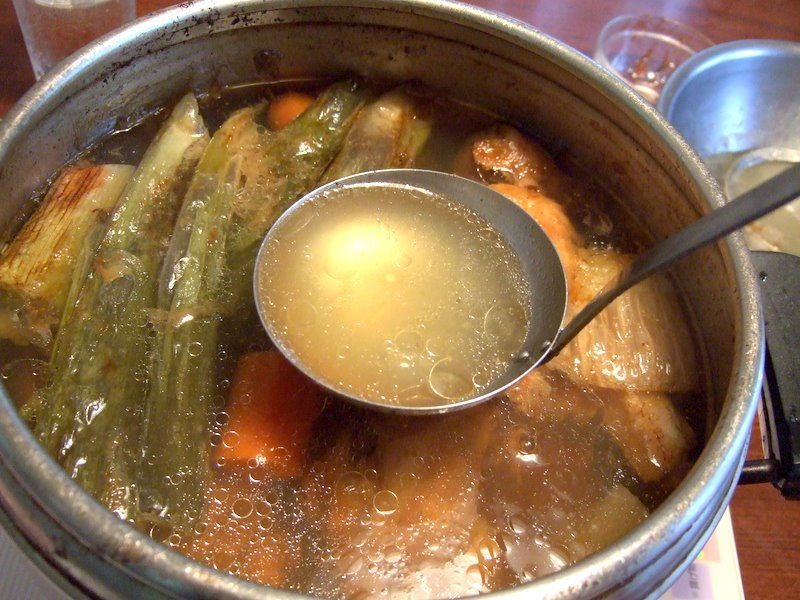
A chicken-based bouillon in the process of preparation

Deglazing is a cooking technique for removing and dissolving browned food residue from a pan to flavor sauces, soups, and gravies.

== Meat ==
When a piece of meat is roasted, pan-fried, or prepared in a pan with another form of dry heat, a deposit of browned sugars, carbohydrates, and/or proteins forms on the bottom of the pan, along with any rendered fat. The French culinary term for these deposits is sucs (pronounced [syk]), from the Latin word succus (sap).

The meat is removed and the majority of the fat is poured off, leaving a small amount with the dried and browned meat juices. The pan is returned to the heat, and a liquid such as vegetable or meat stock, a spirit, wine, or verjuice is added to act as a solvent. Dairy, however, is not recommended for deglazing, as it may curdle when added to high heat. The solvent allows the cook to scrape the dark spots from the bottom of the pan and dissolve them, incorporating the remaining browned material at the bottom of the pan into a basic sauce. The culinary term fond, French for "base" or "foundation", refers to this sauce. (In the United States, fond may also be used interchangeably with sucs.)

The flavour is determined chiefly by the meat, the liquid used for deglazing, and any flavouring or finishing ingredients added, such as aromatics, herbs, or butter.

This method is the cornerstone of many well-known sauces and gravies. The resulting liquid can be seasoned and served on its own (sometimes called a jus), or with the addition of aromatic vegetables, such as onions or shallots, carrots, and celery, or used as the base for a soup. The sauce can also be thickened by whisking in butter, through the addition of a starch, such as flour, cornstarch, or arrowroot, or simply simmered down with a steady heat to form a rich, concentrated reduction.

== Vegetables ==
Deglazing can also be used while cooking vegetables, especially ones that have left sugars at the bottom of a pan. It is commonly used in caramelizing onions. Because vegetables do not produce as much fat, they do not need to be removed from the pan to pour off excess grease. Instead, the liquid can be added directly to the pan and stirred, allowing the fond to meld with the vegetables, rather than creating a separate sauce.
