= List of cooking techniques =

This is a list of cooking techniques commonly used in cooking and food preparation.

Cooking is the practice of preparing food for ingestion, commonly with the application of differentiated heating. Cooking techniques and ingredients vary widely across the world, reflecting unique environments, economics, cultural traditions, and trends. The way that cooking takes place also depends on the skill and type of training of an individual cook as well as the resources available to cook with, such as good butter which heavily impacts the meal.

== A ==
acidulate
To use an acid (such as that found in citrus juice, vinegar, or wine) to prevent browning, alter flavour, or make an item safe for canning.
al dente
To cook food (typically pasta) to the point where it is tender but not mushy.
amandine
A culinary term indicating a garnish of almonds. A dish served amandine is usually cooked with butter and seasonings, then sprinkled with whole or flaked, toasted almonds.
amylolytic process
Used in the brewing of alcohol from grains.
anti-griddle
A kitchen appliance that flash freezes or semi-freezes foods placed on its chilled metal top.
aspic
A savoury gelatin made from meat stock or consommé, and often shaped in a mold. Foods served in aspic are suspended in or on top of the gelatin.
au gratin
Prepared in the gratin style. Foods served au gratin are topped with breadcrumbs or cheese then browned under a broiler.
au jus
Foods served au jus, typically meat or sandwiches, are served with an unthickened sauce made from roast meat drippings, commonly in a separate side dish.
au poivre
Foods served au poivre, typically steak, are crusted with ground black pepper prior to cooking.

== B ==
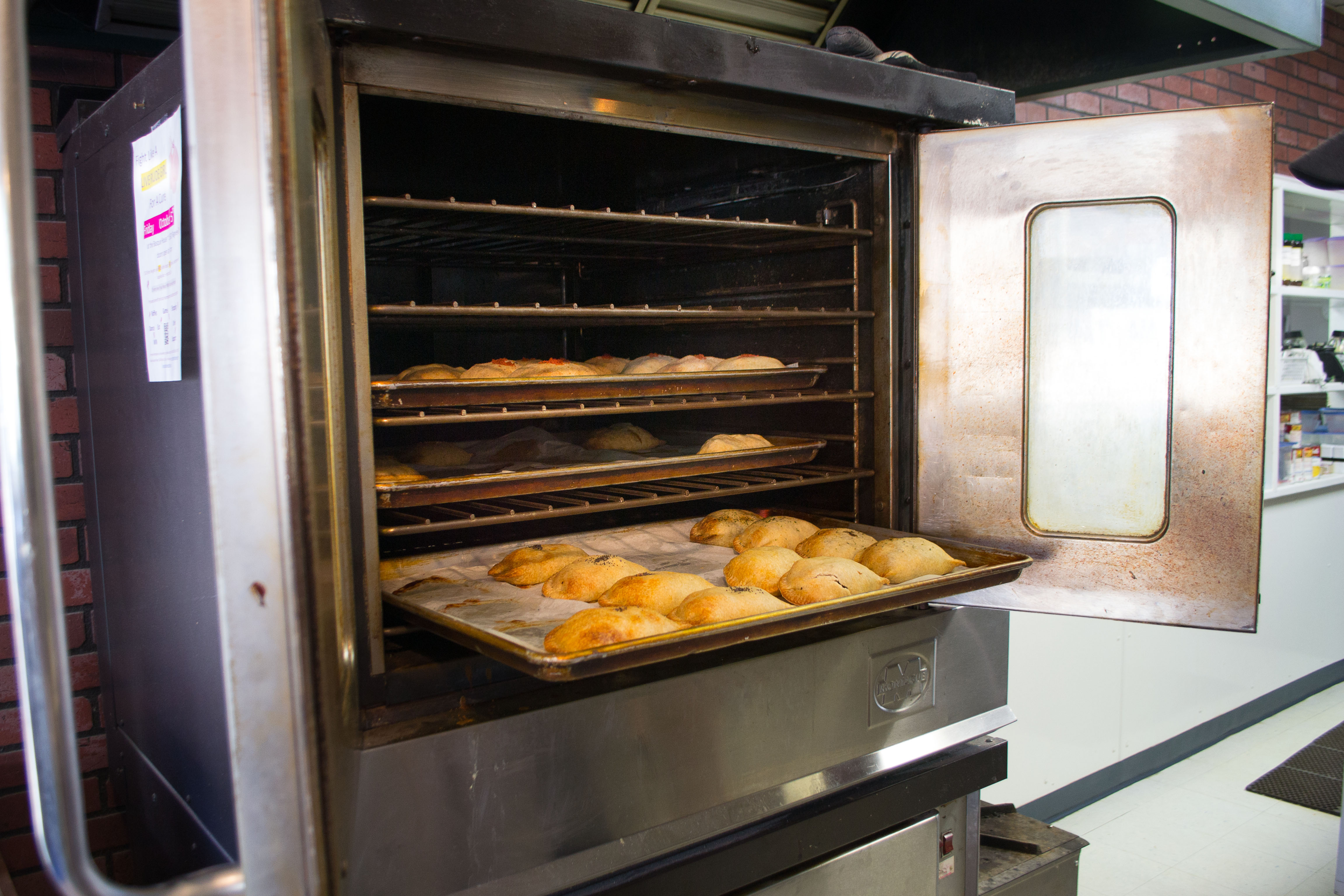
Cornish pasties being baked in an oven

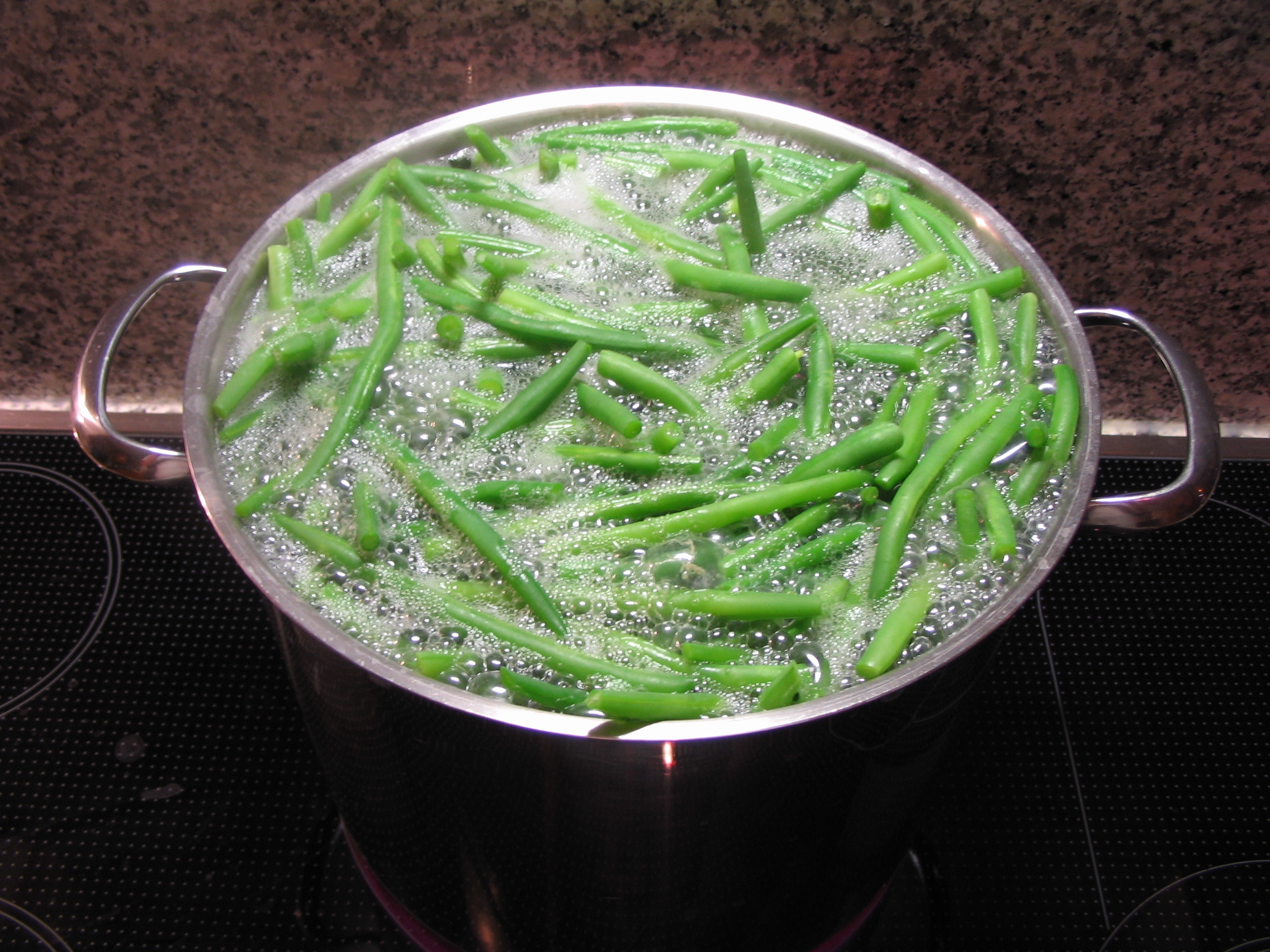
The first step in blanching green beans

backwoods cooking
A method of cooking without the use of utensils that commonly takes place in remote areas, often in combination with wild or conventional camping.
baghaar
A cooking technique used in Pakistani cuisine and Indian cuisine in which cooking oil is heated and spices are added to fry. The oil is then added to a dish for flavoring.
bain-marie
A method of cooking where a container of food is placed in or above boiling water in order to heat gradually or to keep warm.
baking
barding
Wrapping meat in fat prior to roasting.
barbecuing
Cooking meat or fish slowly over a barbecue grill with indirect heat and smoke.
basting
Periodically pouring liquid over food as it roasts.
blanching
A technique by which a fresh food such as a vegetable or fruit is briefly immersed in boiling water, removed after a timed interval, and then plunged into iced water or rinsed with cold running water (shocking or refreshing) to halt the cooking process.
boiling
braising
A combination-cooking method that uses both wet and dry heats: typically, the food is first seared at a high temperature, then finished in a covered pot at a lower temperature while sitting in some (variable) amount of liquid (which may also add flavor).
bricolage
The preparation of a meal from whatever ingredients happen to be on hand.
brine
To soak a food item in salted water.
broasting
A method of cooking chicken and other foods using a pressure fryer and condiments.
browning
The process of partially cooking the surface of meat to help remove excessive fat and to give the meat a brown color crust and flavor through various browning reactions.

== C ==
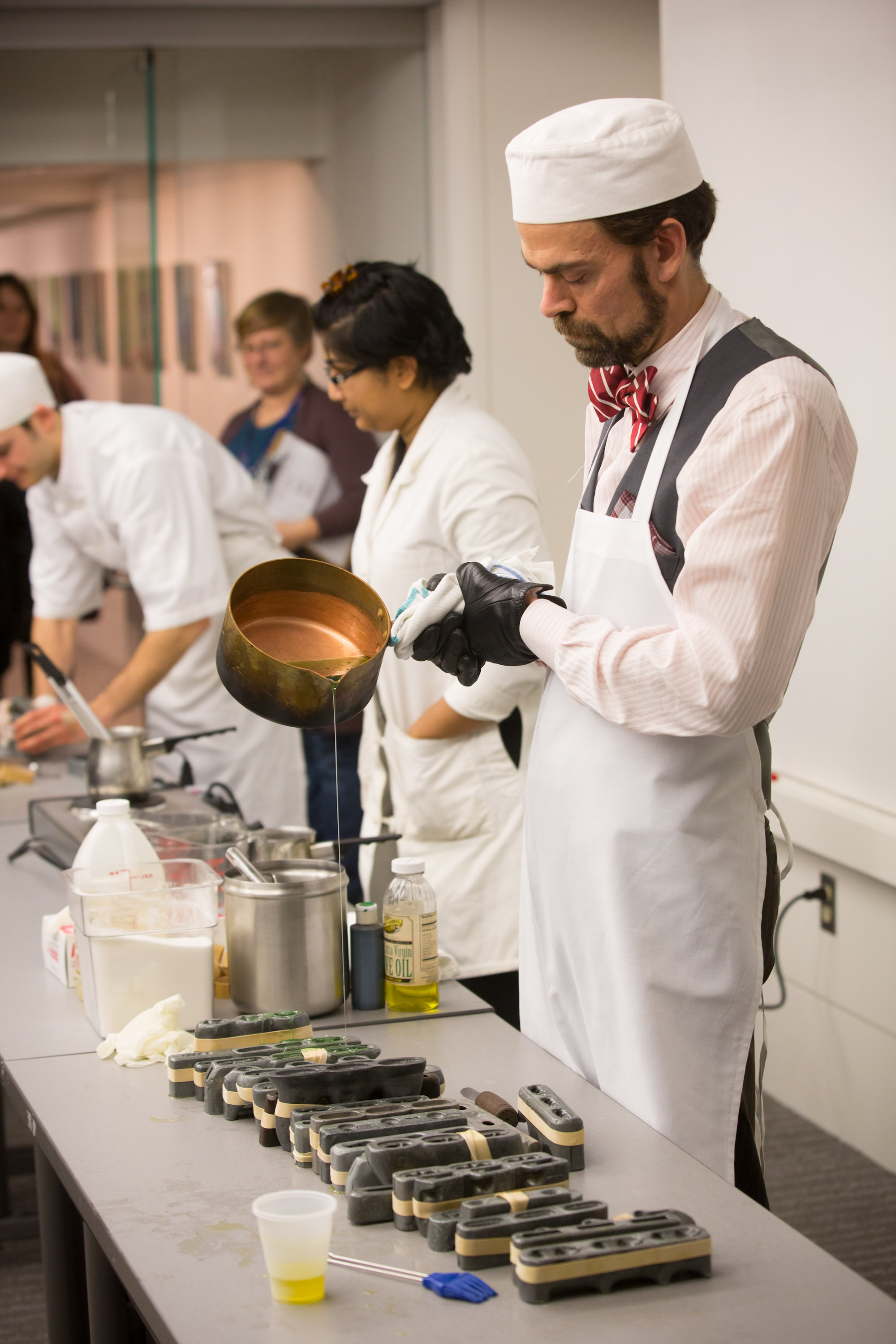
Hot liquid candy being poured into candy molds by a candymaker

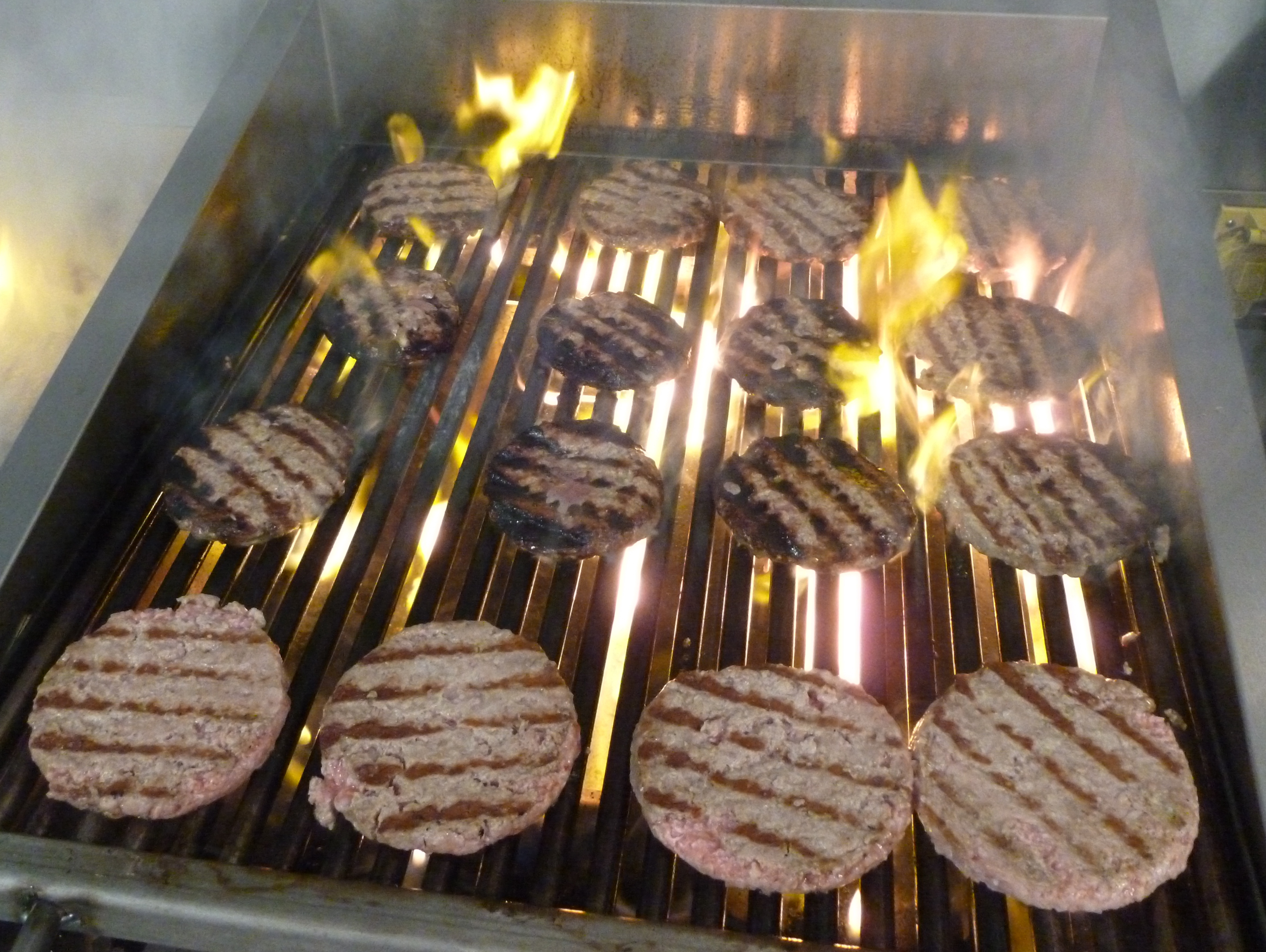
Hamburgers cooking on a charbroiler

candy making
The preparation of candies and sugar confections by dissolving sugar in water or milk to form a syrup, which is boiled until it reaches the desired concentration or starts to caramelize.
caramelization
The browning of sugar, a process used extensively in cooking for the resulting nutty flavor and brown color.
carryover cooking
The phenomenon by which food retains heat and continues to cook even after being removed from the source of heat.
cartouche
A parchment paper lid used to trap some steam during cooking.
casserole
Food cooked and served in a casserole dish.
charbroiler
A cooking device consisting of a series of grates or ribs that can be heated using a variety of means, and is used in both residential and commercial applications for a variety of cooking operations.
cheesemaking
The craft of making cheese.
chiffonade
To cut leaves into long thin strips.
Chinese cooking techniques
A set of methods and techniques traditionally used in Chinese cuisine. The cooking techniques can either be grouped into ones that use a single cooking method or a combination of wet and dry cooking methods.
red cooking

A slow braising technique that imparts a red color to the prepared food, frequently used in Chinese cuisine.
clay pot cooking
A process of cooking food in a pot made from unglazed and natural clay.
coddling
Heating food in water kept just below the boiling point. Coddled egg may be prepared using this method.
concasse
To rough chop any ingredient, especially vegetables. The term is particularly applied to tomatoes, where tomato concasse is a tomato that has been peeled, seeded (seeds and skins removed), and chopped to specified dimensions.
conche
A surface-scraping mixer and agitator that evenly distributes cocoa butter within chocolate, and may act as a "polisher" of the particles.
confit
A generic term for various kinds of food that have been cooked in grease, oil, or sugar water (syrup).
consommé
A type of clear soup made from richly flavored stock or bouillon that has been clarified.
cooking with alcohol
Many dishes incorporate alcoholic beverages into the food itself.
cream
The butterfat-heavy portion of whole milk that, due to its fat content, separates from the milk and rises to the top.
creaming
1. Combining ingredients (typically butter and sugar) into a smooth paste.
2. Cooking meat or vegetables in a thick dairy-based sauce.
3. Mixing puréed corn kernels with whole corn kernels in the preparation of creamed corn.
croquette
A small roll made of finely chopped meat and/or vegetables that is breaded and fried.
culinary triangle
A concept described by anthropologist Claude Lévi-Strauss involving three types of cooking: boiling, roasting, and smoking, usually done to meat.
curdling
The breaking of an emulsion or colloid into large parts of different composition through the physico-chemical processes of flocculation, creaming, and coalescence. Curdling is intentional and desirable in making cheese and tofu, but may be unintentional and undesirable in making other foods such as sauces and custards.
cured fish
Fish preserved by fermentation, pickling, smoking, or some combination of these techniques.
curing
Any of a wide variety of food preservation and flavoring processes used for foods such as meat, fish, and vegetables, by the addition of a combination of salt, nitrates, nitrite, or sugar. Many curing processes also involve smoking, the process of flavoring, or cooking. The use of food dehydration was the earliest form of food curing.
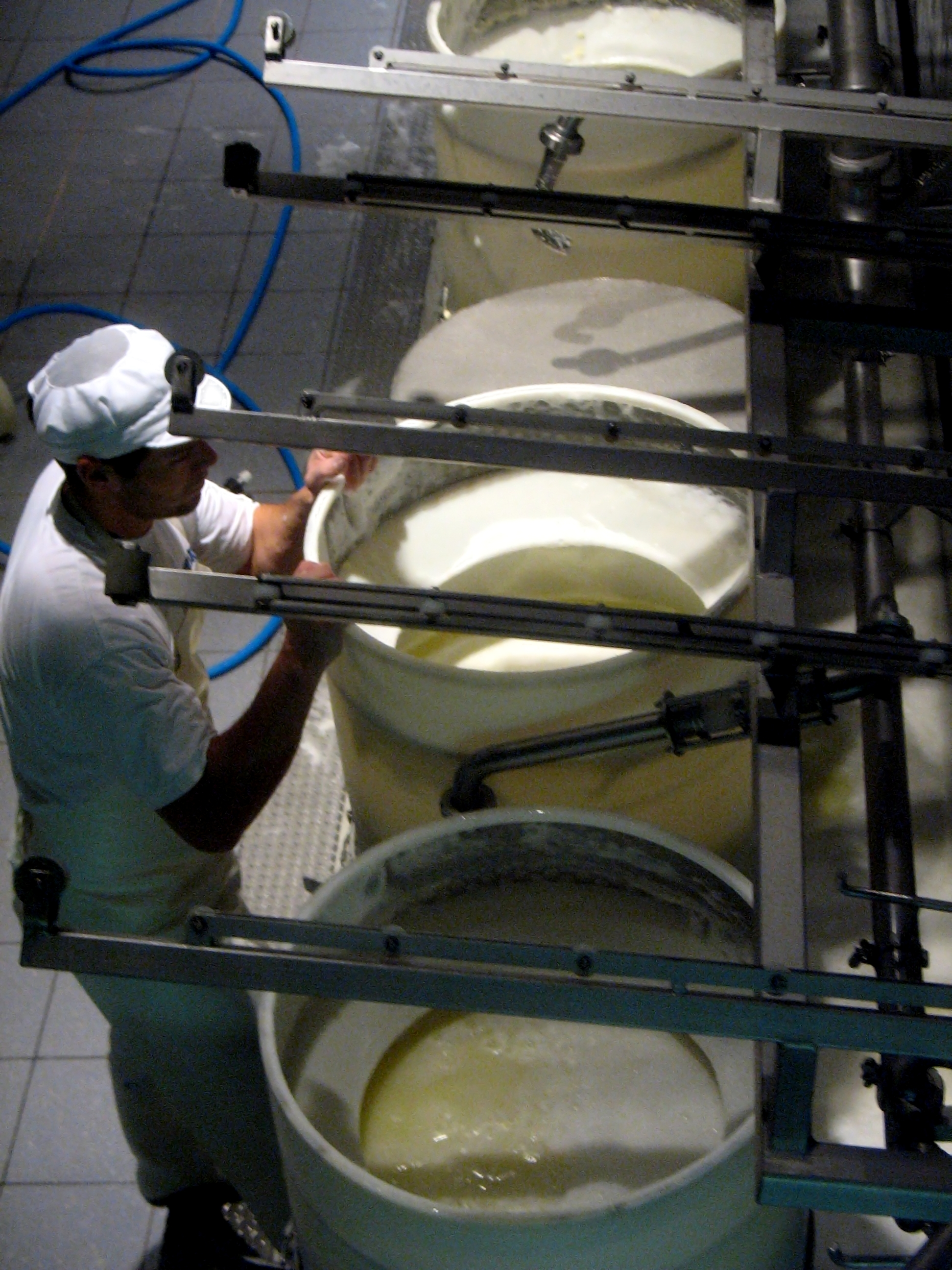
The production of Gruyère cheese at the cheesemaking factory of Gruyères, Canton of Fribourg, Switzerland

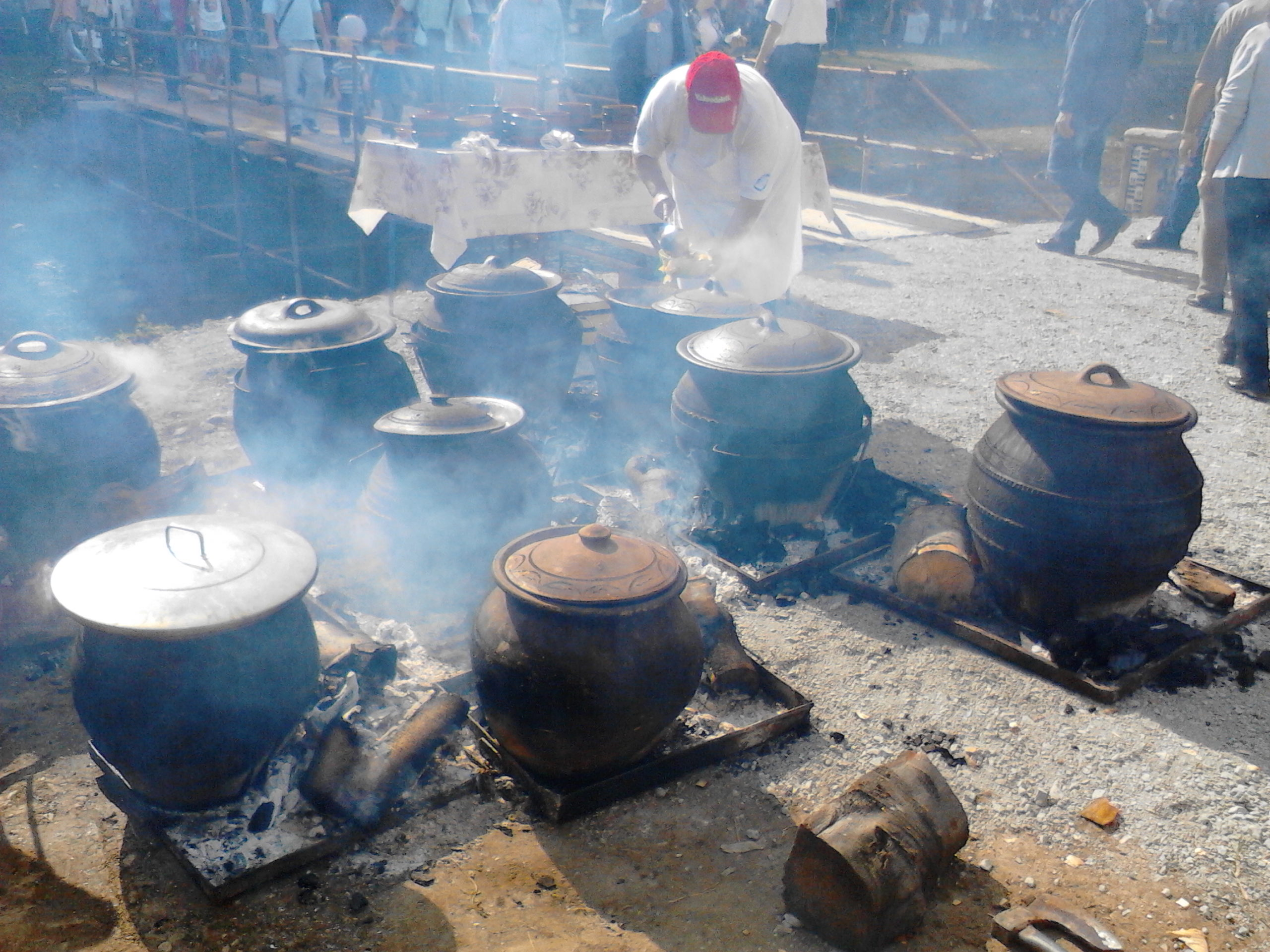
Cooking of Svadbarski Kupus (wedding cabbage) in clay pots, Serbia

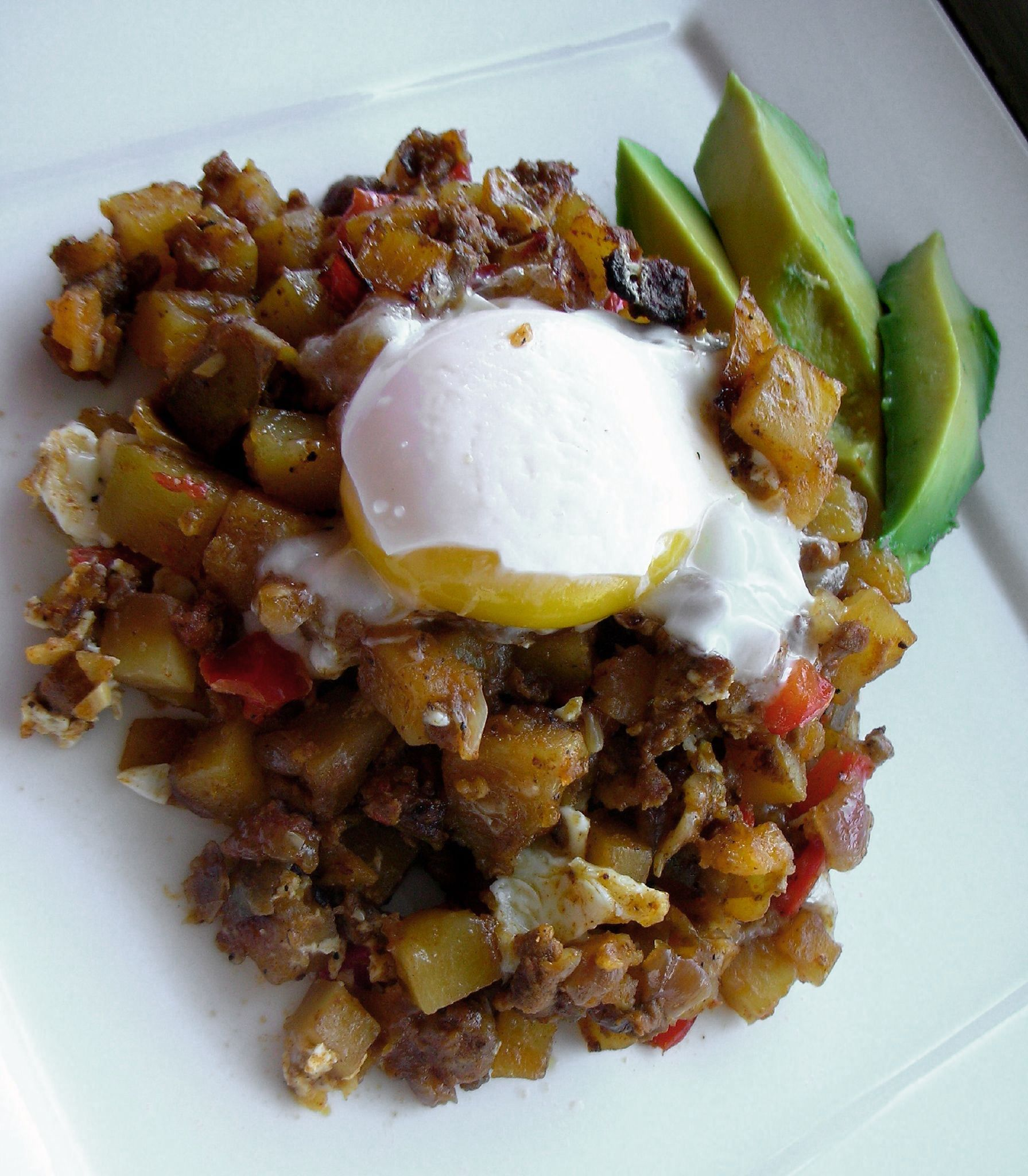
A coddled egg atop hash

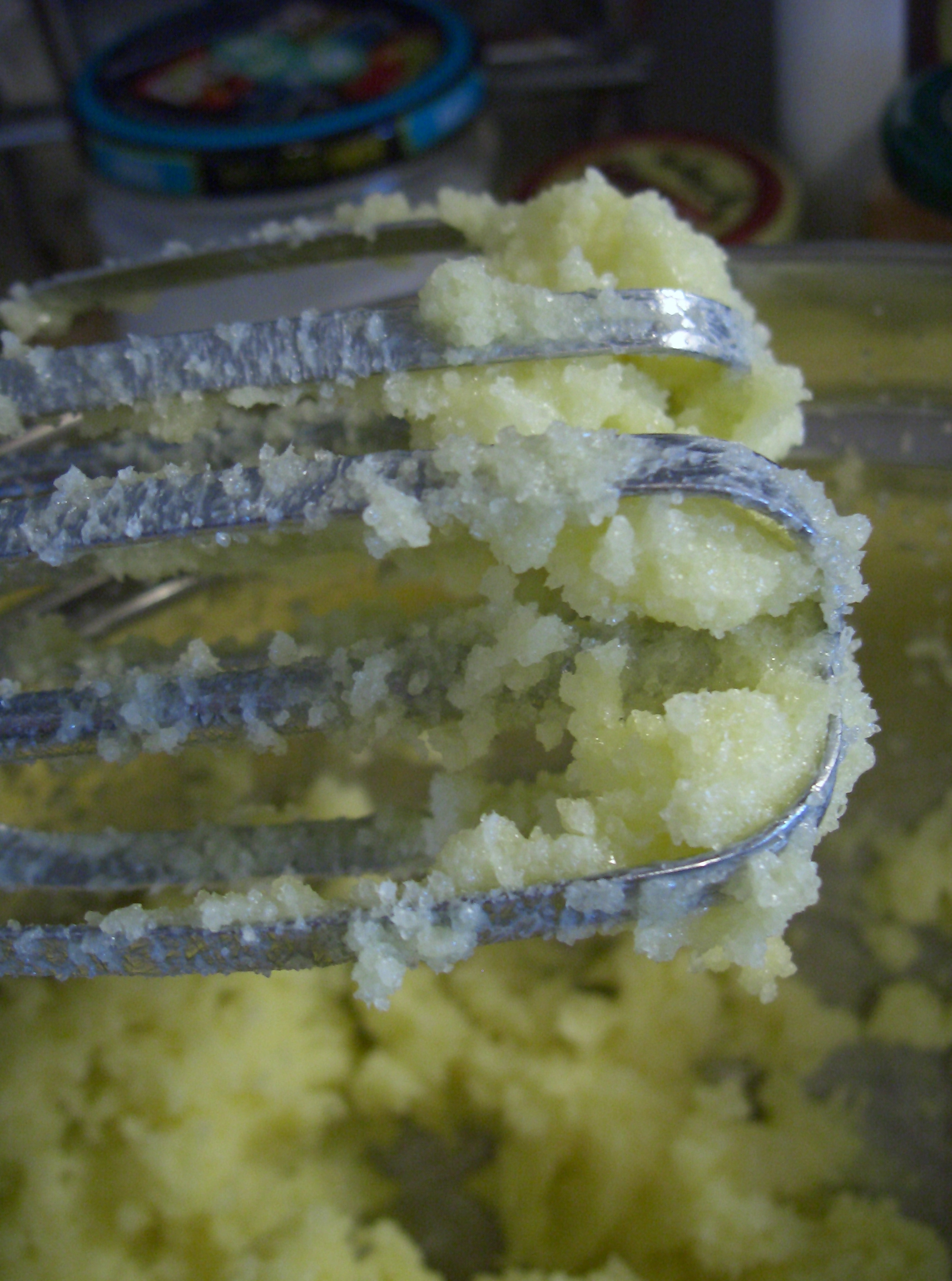
Butter being creamed using electric beaters

== D ==
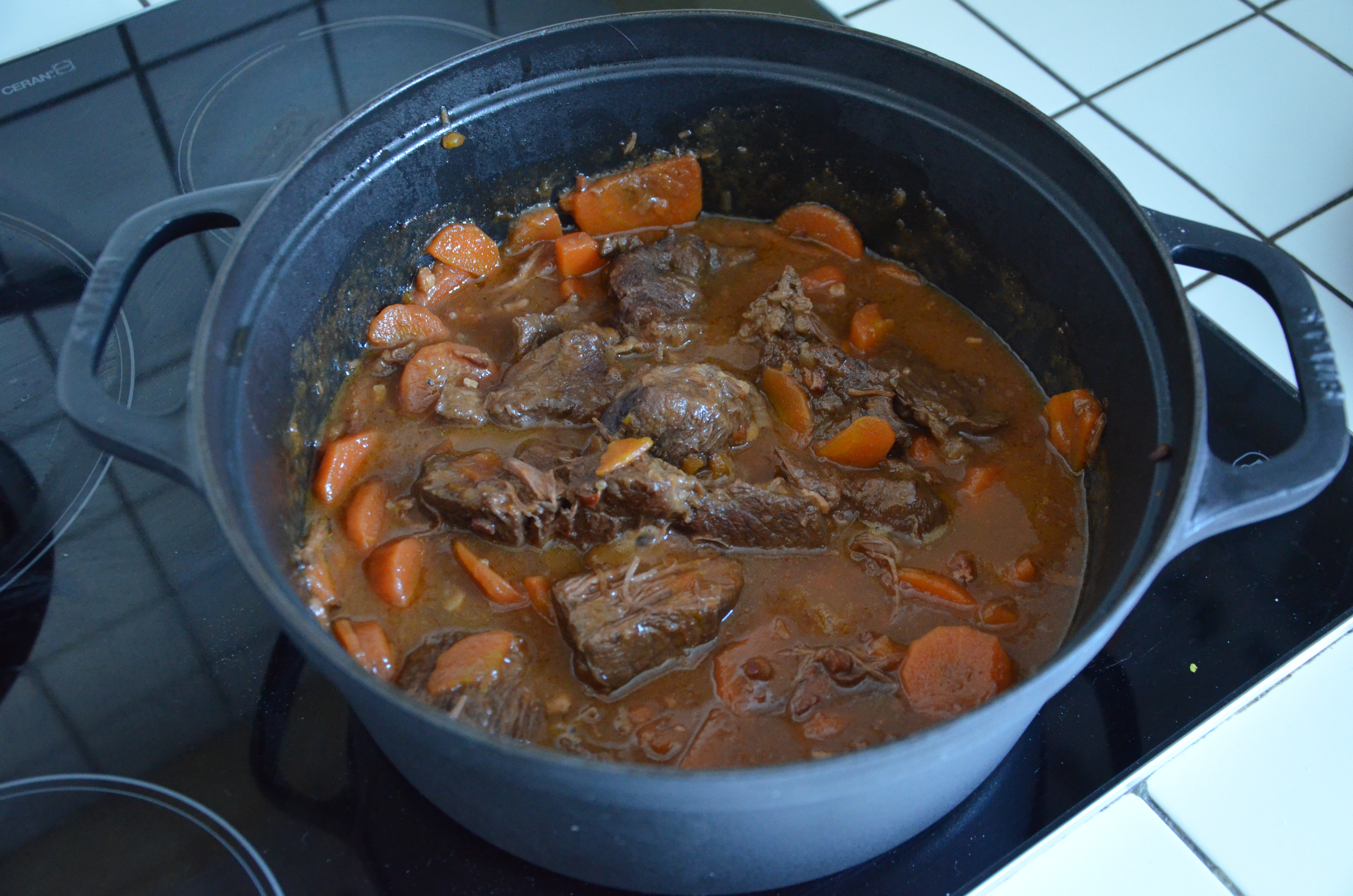
A beef stew being cooked in a Dutch oven

deep frying
A technique by which a food is completely submerged in hot fat or oil (as opposed to ordinary frying, which involves placing the food in a shallow pool of oil).
deglazing
degreasing
dough sheeting
A technique used in industrial bakeries that involves rolling out dough into a (consistent) dough sheet with a desired even thickness prior to baking.
dredging
Coating the exterior of a food with a dry material (such as breadcrumbs) prior to cooking.
dry roasting
drying
Any of a variety of processes by which a food is preserved by removing moisture, often by the use of a modern food dehydrator or by the traditional method of allowing sunlight and fresh air to evaporate moisture.
dum pukht

A cooking technique associated with the Awadh region of India, in which meat and vegetables are cooked over a extremely low flame, generally in containers that are sealed.
Dutch oven cooking
A Dutch oven is well suited for long, slow cooking, such as in making roasts, stews, and casseroles. Virtually any recipe that can be cooked in a conventional oven can be cooked in a Dutch oven. They are often used in outdoor cooking, such as when camping.

== E ==
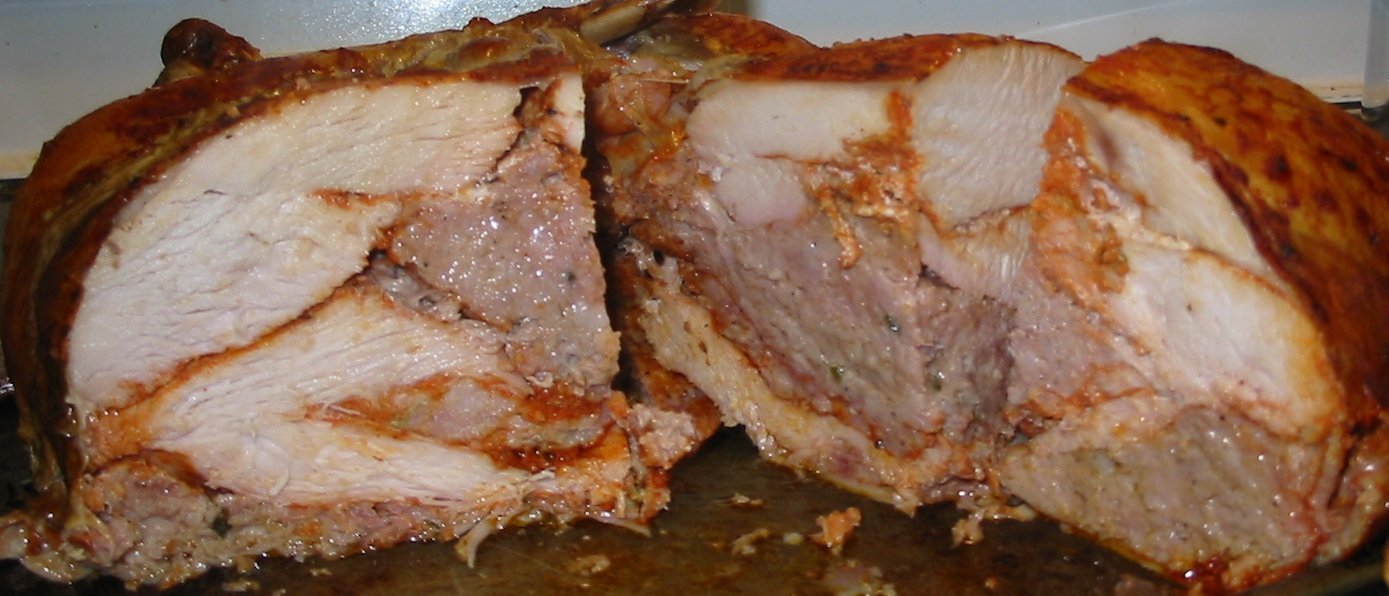
Engastration: the interior of a sausage-stuffed turducken

earth oven
A shallow pit in the ground used to trap heat and bake, smoke, or steam food.
egg wash
A preparation of beaten eggs, sometimes mixed with another liquid such as water or milk, which is brushed onto the surface of a pastry before baking for a golden crisp finish.
emulsify
To combine two liquids that have a natural tendency to separate (such as oil and vinegar) into one homogeneous mass.
en papillote
A technique by which a food is put into a folded pouch or parcel and then baked.
en vessie
A cooking method by which a meat or other dish is cooked inside an animal bladder, often a pig bladder.
engastration
A cooking method by which the cook stuffs the remains of one animal into another animal.
engine cooking
Cooking food from the excess heat of an internal combustion engine, typically the engine of a car or a truck.
escagraph
Writing made out of food.

== F ==
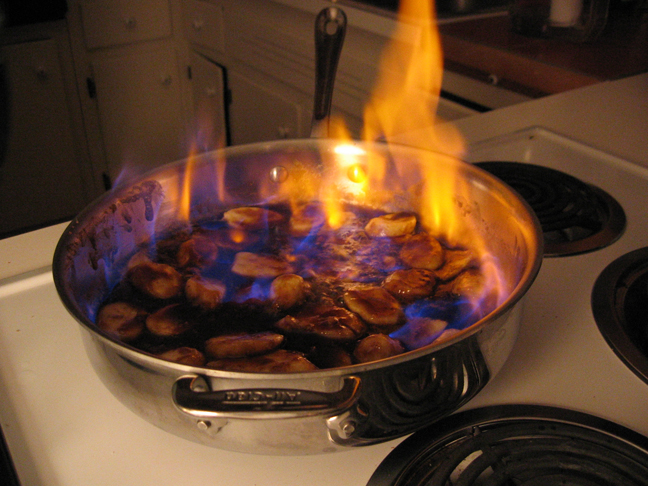
Bananas Foster being flambéed

fermentation
fillet
To remove bones from meat or fish.
flambé
To pour alcohol over food and then ignite.
flattop grill
foam
A gelling or stabilizing agent in which air is suspended, creating a light, "fluffy" edible substance, e.g. whipped cream, meringue, and mousse.
food preservation
canning
Involves the cooking of foods in sealed cans, among other processes.
fondue
fricassee
frosting
1. (v.) The act of applying icing to the exterior of a baked good (such as a cake or cookie).
2. (n.) The icing itself.
fruit preserves
frying
To cook food in oil.
chicken frying
Battering and pan-frying a piece of beefsteak.

== G ==
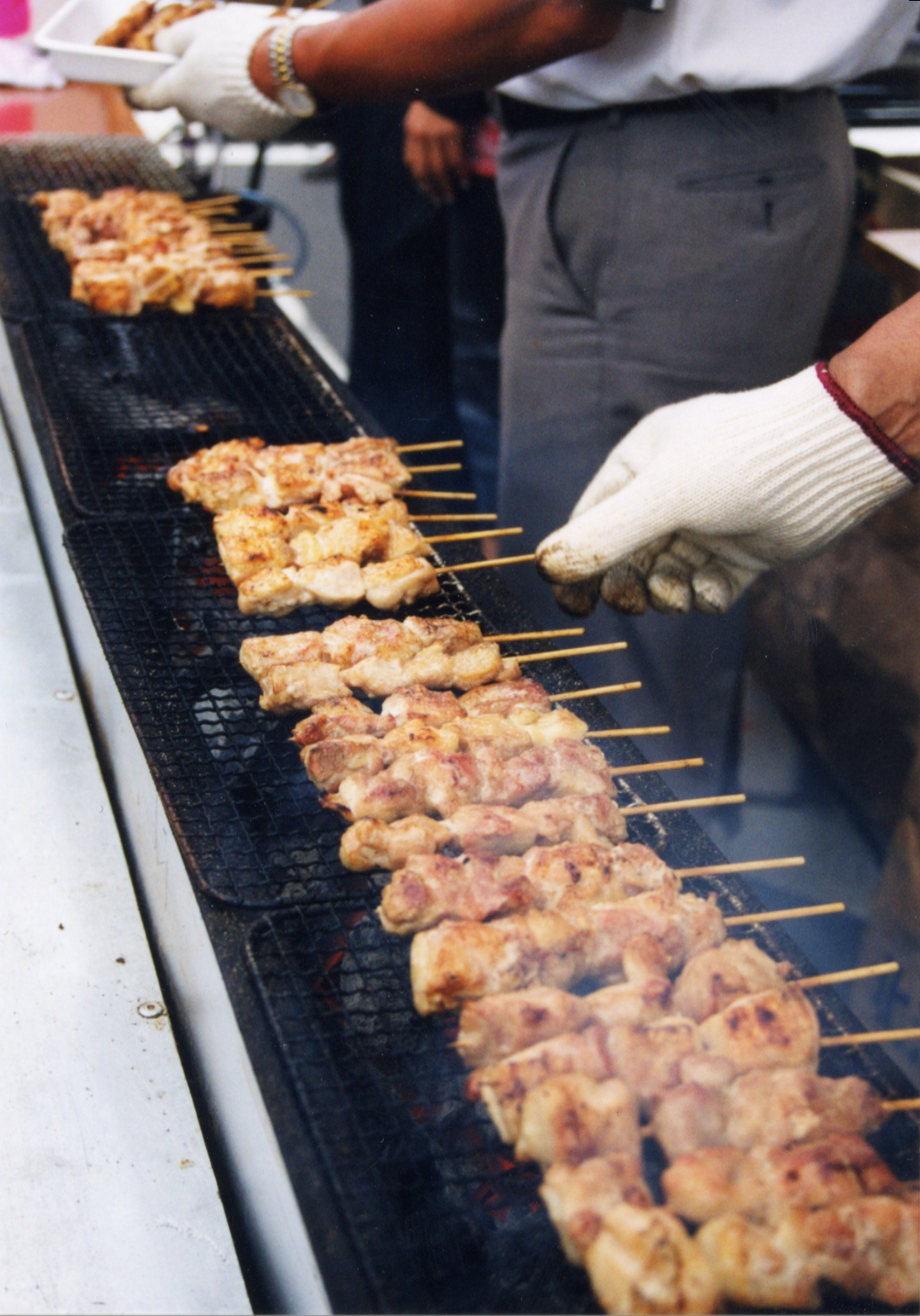
Yakitori being grilled

garnish
1. (v.) To add a (typically edible) decorative element to a plate of food prior to serving.
2. (n.) The edible decorative element itself. Parsley is a common garnish.
gentle frying
glazing
gratin
grilling

== H ==
Hāngī
A traditional New Zealand Māori method of cooking food using heated rocks buried in a pit oven still used for special occasions.
hibachi
high-altitude cooking
The process of cooking a food or beverage at altitudes well above sea level, where lower atmospheric pressure causes most foods to cook more slowly and may necessitate the use of special cooking techniques.
homogenization
hot salt frying
huff paste

== I ==
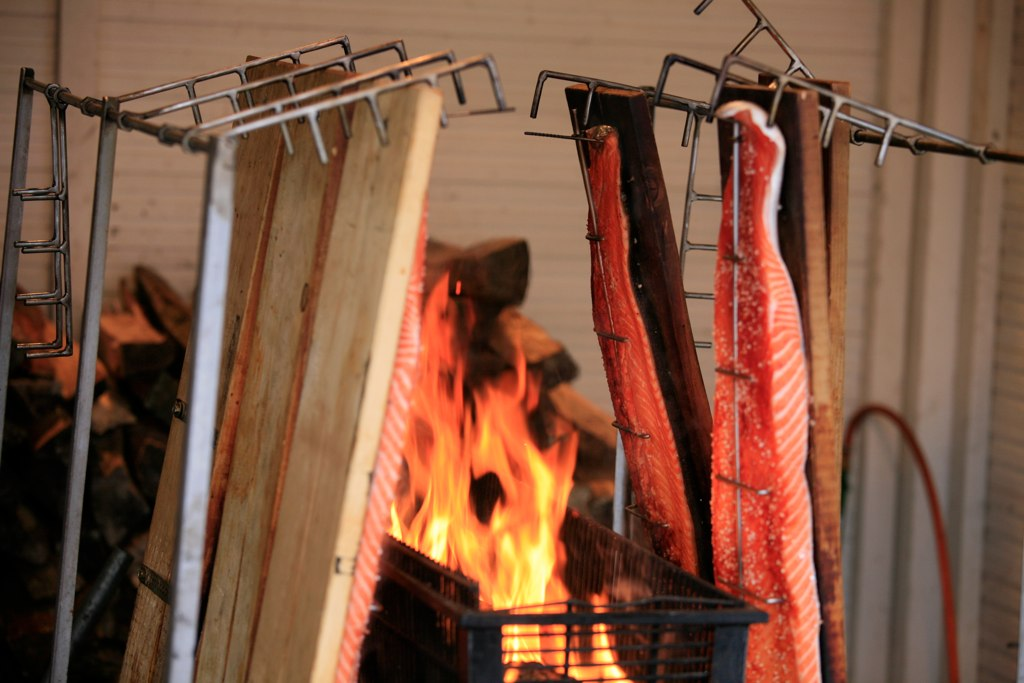
One method of indirect grilling involves plank cooking, such as the salmon fillets here

indirect grilling
infusion
The process of extracting chemical compounds or flavors from plant material in a solvent such as water, oil, or alcohol, by allowing the material to remain suspended in the solvent over time (a process often called steeping). A common example of an infusion is tea, and many herbal teas are prepared in the same way.

== J ==
jugging
The process of stewing whole animals, mainly game or fish, for an extended period in a tightly covered container such as a casserole dish or an earthenware jug.
juicing
Julienne
A culinary knife cut which involves cutting food (typically vegetables) into long thin strips.

== K ==
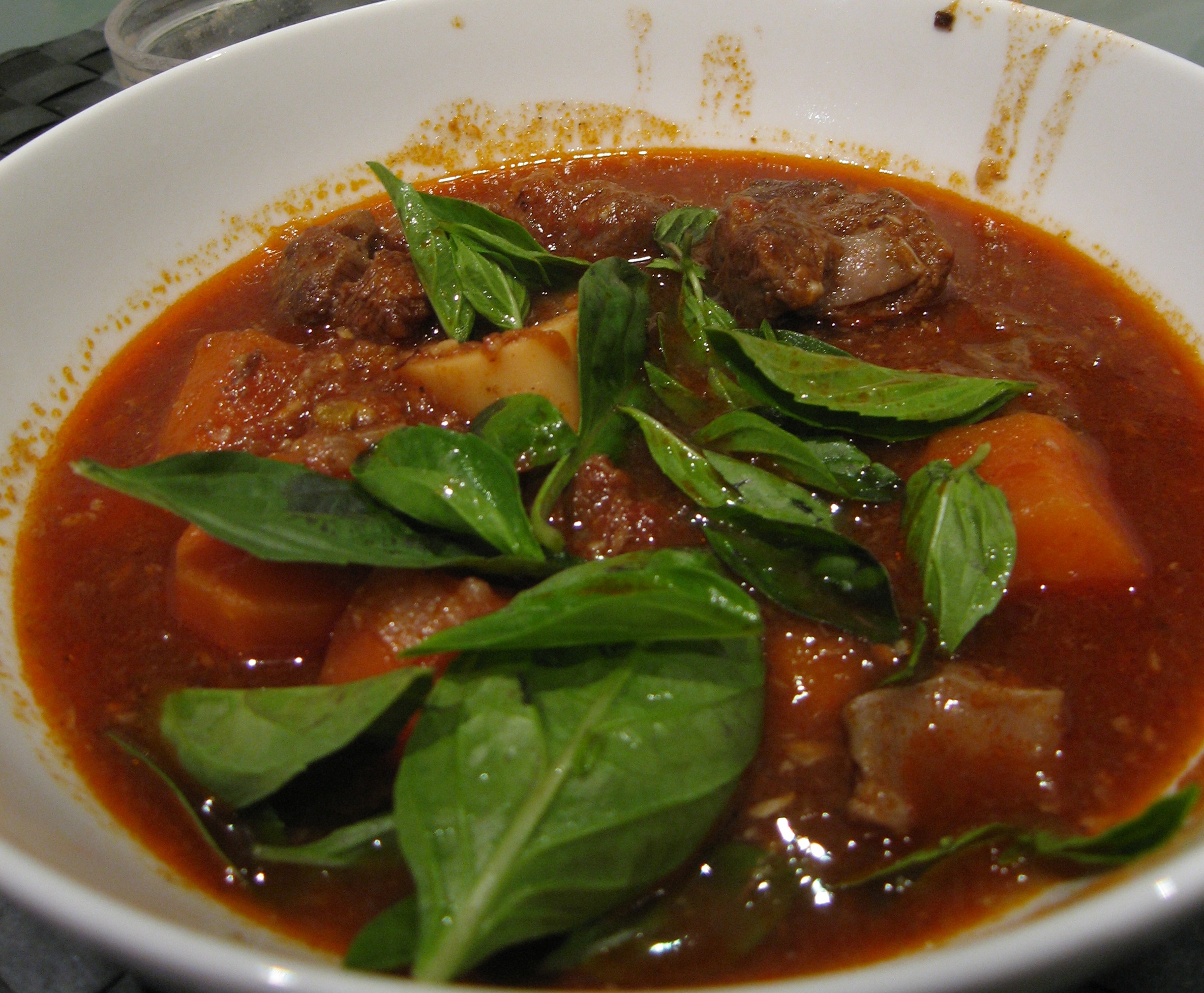
Bo Kho (beef stew)

kalua
A traditional Hawaiian cooking method that utilizes an imu, a type of underground oven.
karaage
A Japanese cooking technique in which various foods — most often chicken, but also other meat and fish — are deep fried in oil, similar to the preparation of tempura, but with a dredge in starch, rather than a liquid batter.
kho
A cooking technique in Vietnamese cuisine in which a protein source such as fish, shrimp, poultry, pork, beef, or fried tofu is braised on low heat in a mixture of fish sauce, sugar, and water or a water substitute such as young coconut juice. It is similar to stew.
kinpira
A Japanese cooking style that can be summarized as a technique of "sauté and simmer". It is commonly used to cook root vegetables and other foods.

== L ==
larding
The act of threading strips of chilled pork fat through a roast.
low-temperature cooking

== M ==
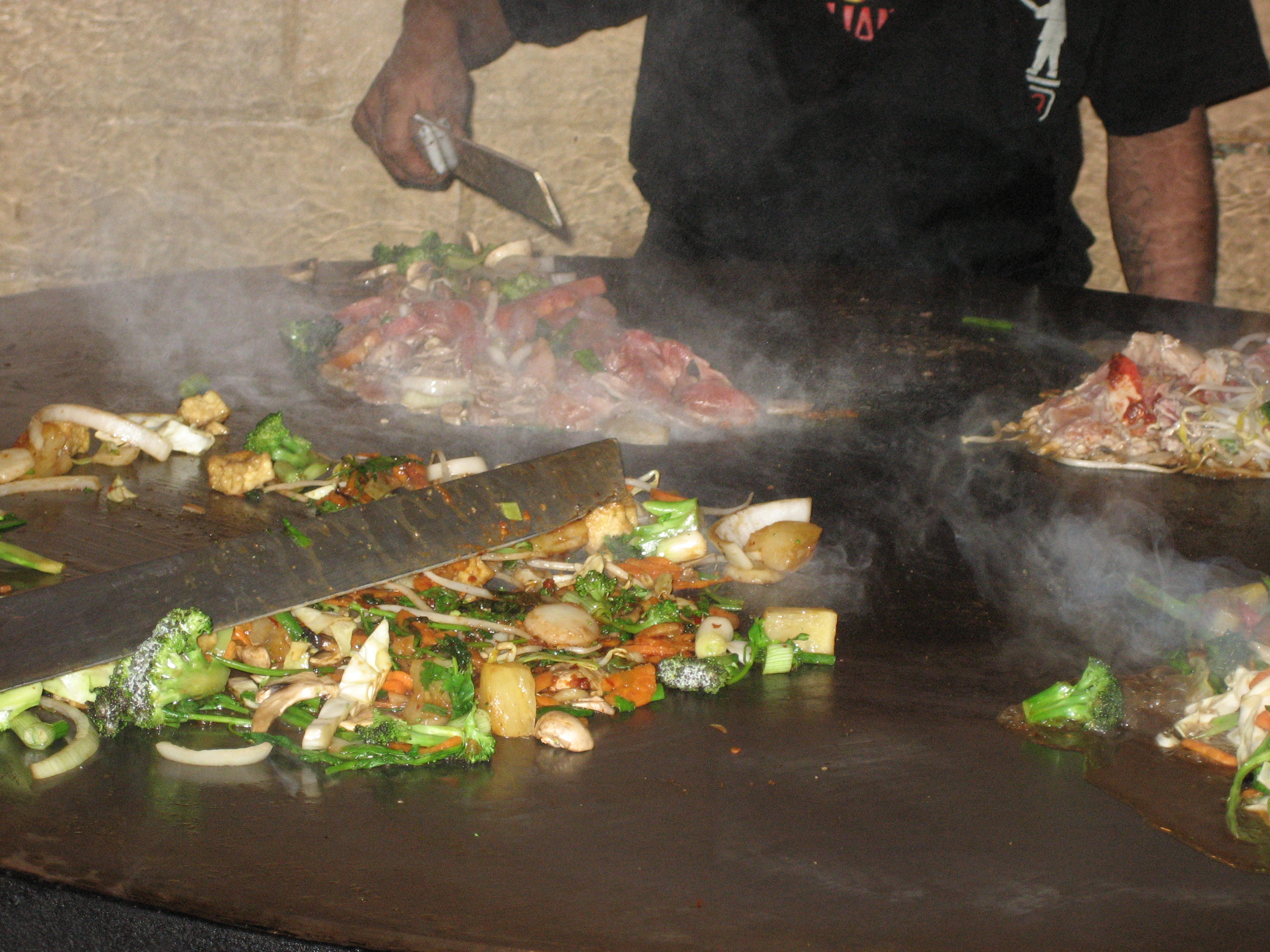
Food cooking on a Mongolian barbecue griddle

maceration
marination
The technique of soaking a food in a seasoned, often acidic, liquid (known as a marinade) prior to cooking. Marination is generally used as a means of adding or enhancing flavor or tenderizing tough cuts of meat, and the process can vary greatly in duration. It is similar to but distinct from brining and pickling.
meat cooking techniques
microwave cooking
The cooking of food in a microwave oven.
mincing
Mongolian barbecue
mother sauces
In French cuisine, the five "fundamental" sauces: béchamel, espagnole, velouté, hollandaise, and tomate, as defined by Auguste Escoffier.

maliard

== N ==
nappage
nixtamalization
A process for the preparation of maize (corn) or other grain in which the grain is soaked and cooked in an alkaline solution, usually limewater, and then hulled.

== O ==
once-a-month cooking (OAMC)
Preparing and cooking all the meals you need for an entire month in a single day.
outdoor cooking
Cooking in outdoor environments, which often demand specialized techniques and equipment for preparing food. Equipment used includes mess kits and portable stoves, among others.

== P ==
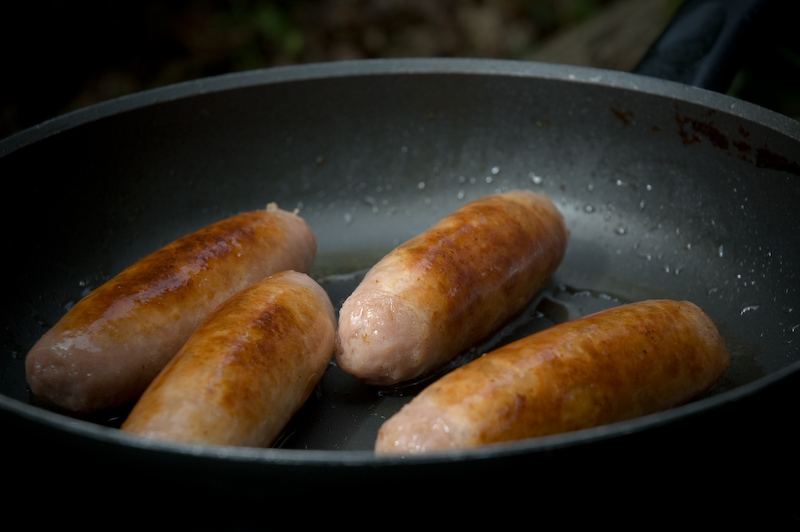
Sausages being pan fried in a frying pan

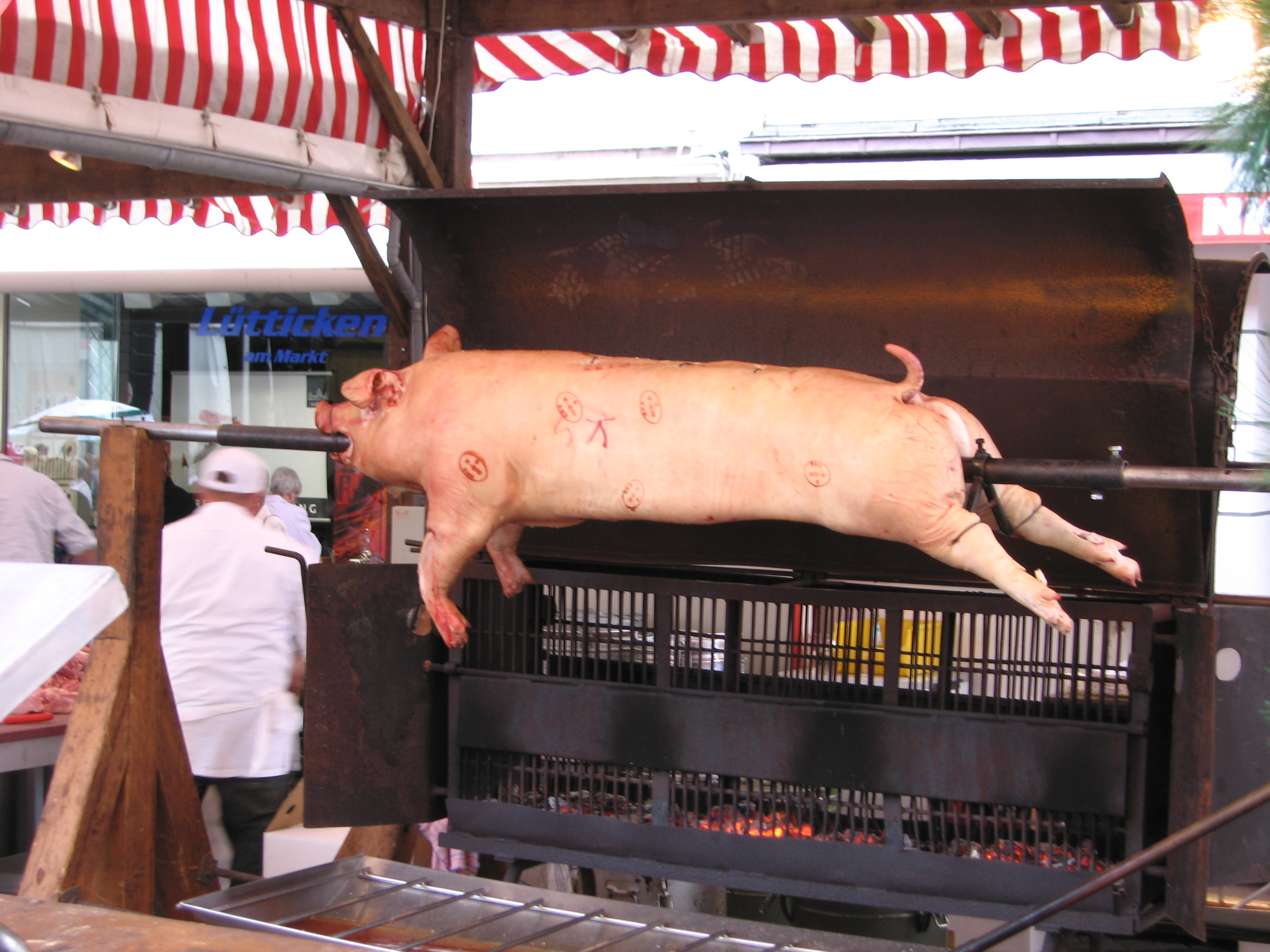
A pig roast in Wittlich, Germany

pan frying
Characterized by the use of minimal cooking oil or fat (as opposed to shallow frying or deep frying), typically using just enough oil to lubricate the pan.
parbaking
parboiling

Partially or incompletely boiling a food, especially as the first step in a longer cooking process. Parboiling involves cooking a food in boiling water only until it begins to soften, removing the food before it is fully cooked. The cooking is then often finished by a different method, such as braising or grilling.
pascalization
paste
pasteurization
flash pasteurization
pellicle
A skin or coating of proteins on the surface of meat, fish, or poultry, which allows smoke to better adhere to the surface of the meat during the smoking process.
pickling
pig roast
poaching
pre-ferment
pressure cooking
The process of cooking food, using water or other cooking liquid, in a sealed vessel known as a pressure cooker, which does not permit air or liquids to escape below a pre-set pressure.
pressure frying
proofing
pulling
purée

== R ==
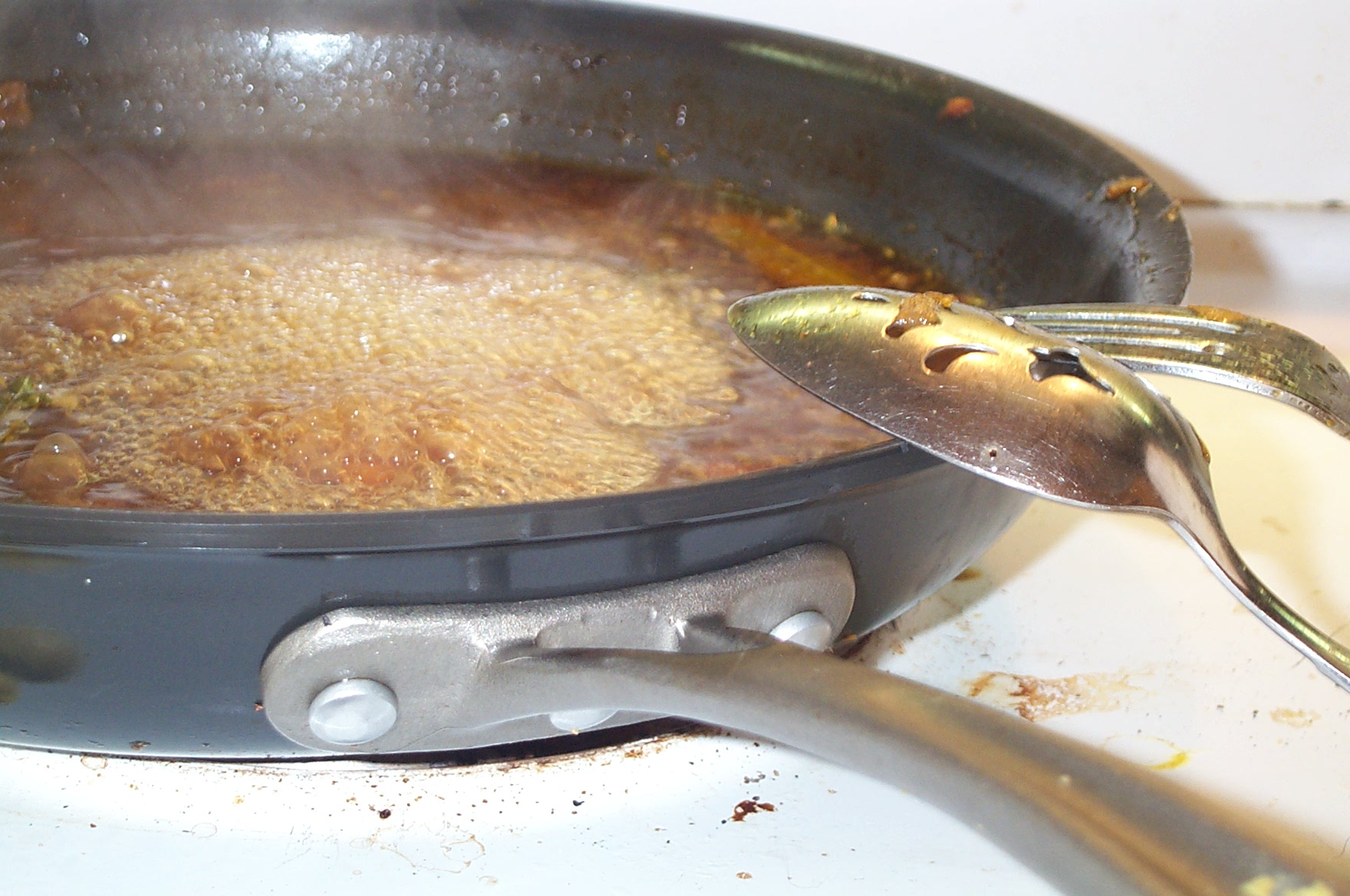
Stock being reduced in a pan

reconstitution
The process of assembling a palatable food product from processed sources (for example, adding water to concentrated juice or forming meat slurry into chicken nuggets).
red cooking
reduction
rendering
ricing
rillettes
roasting
robatayaki
rotisserie

roux
A paste-like thickening agent made of equal quantities of flour and fat cooked together to a sandy texture.

== S ==
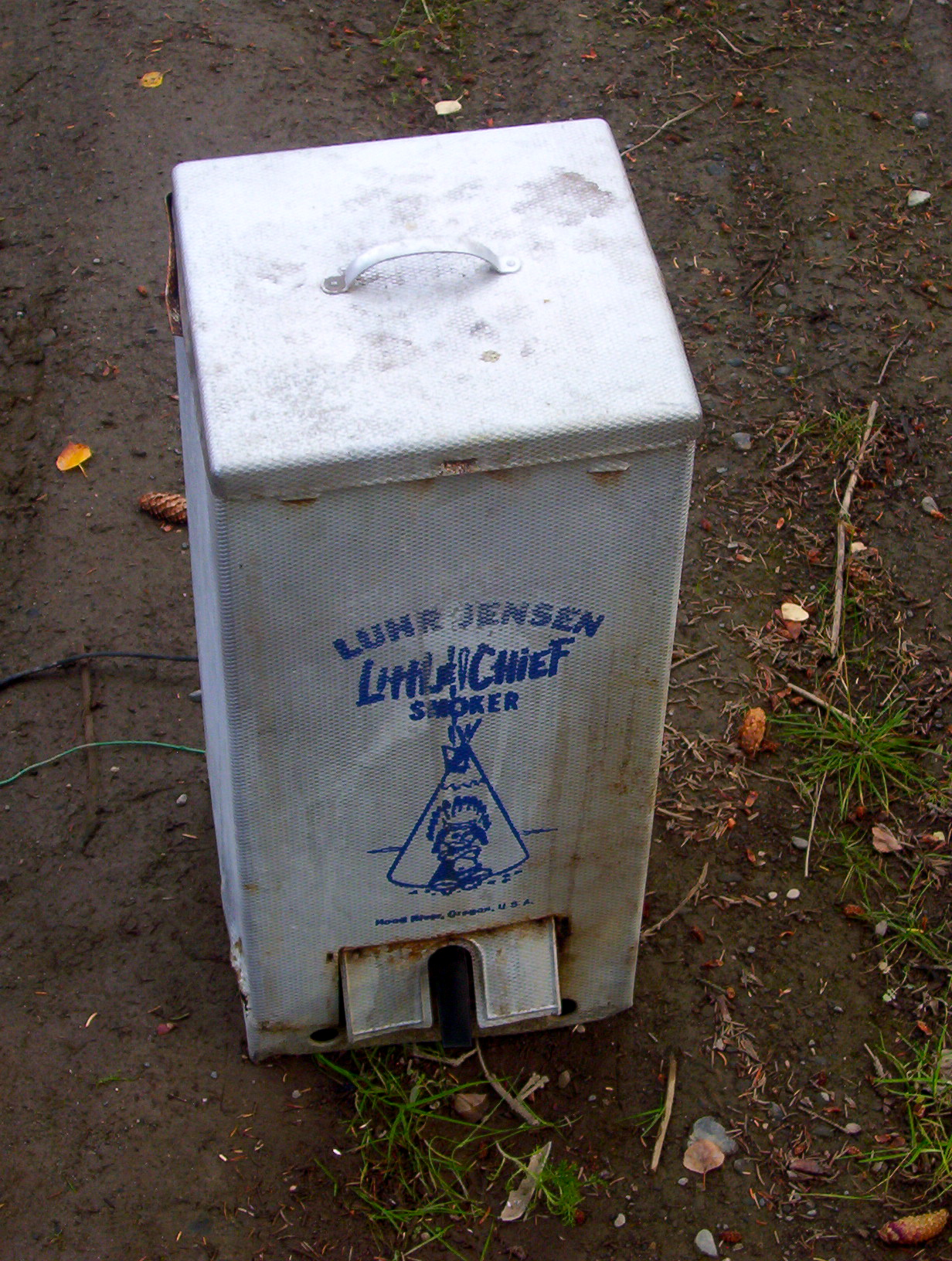
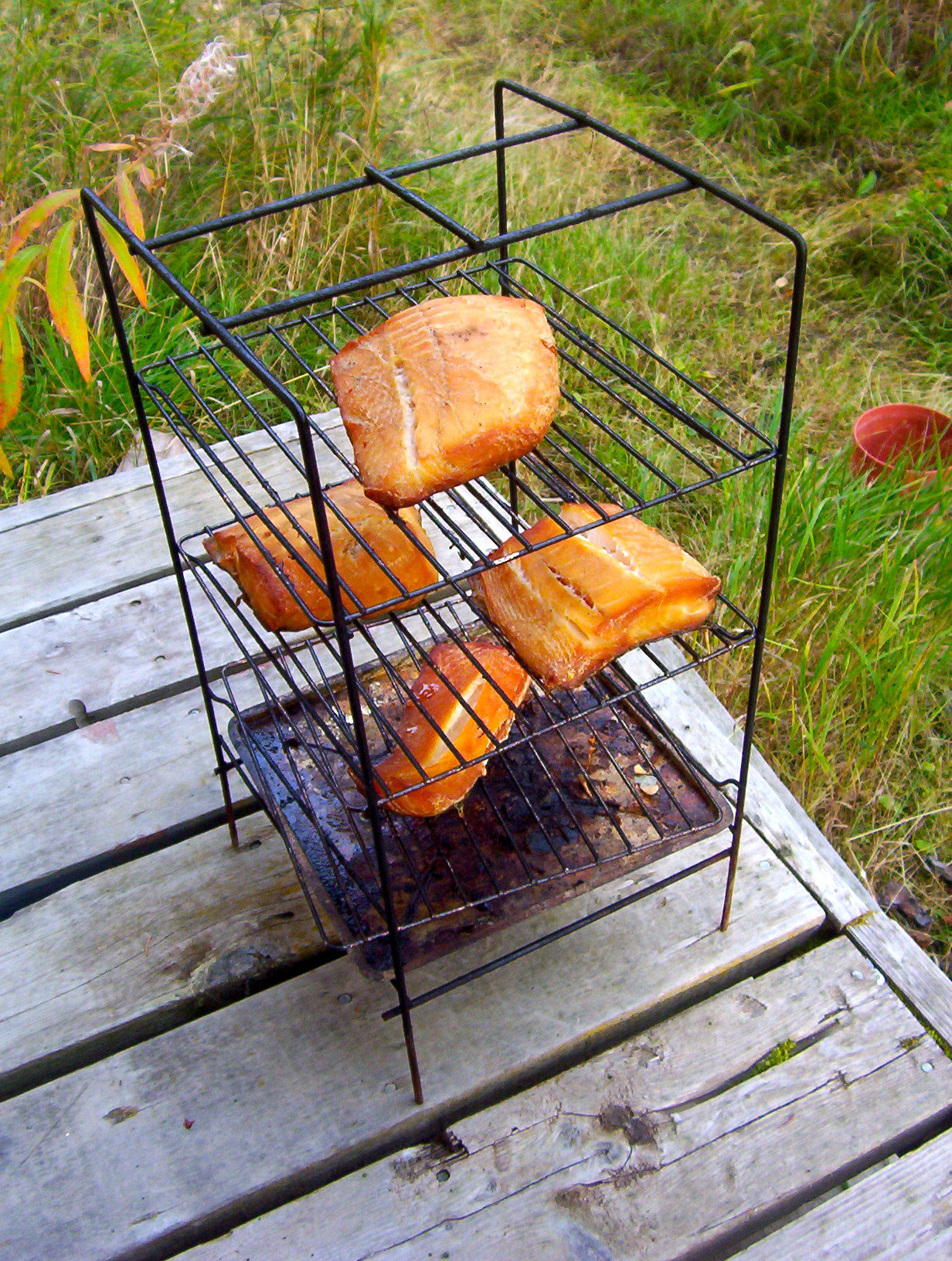
A home smoker and racks with hot smoked Pacific halibut

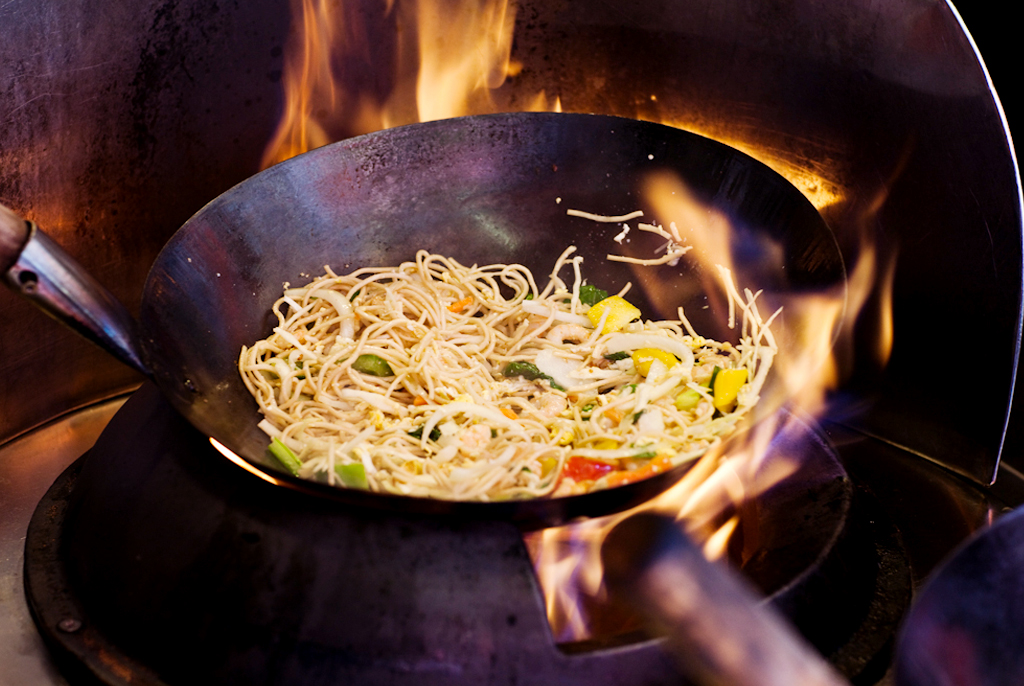
Bao stir frying involves high heat combined with continuous tossing. This keeps juices from flowing out of the ingredients and keeps the food crispy.

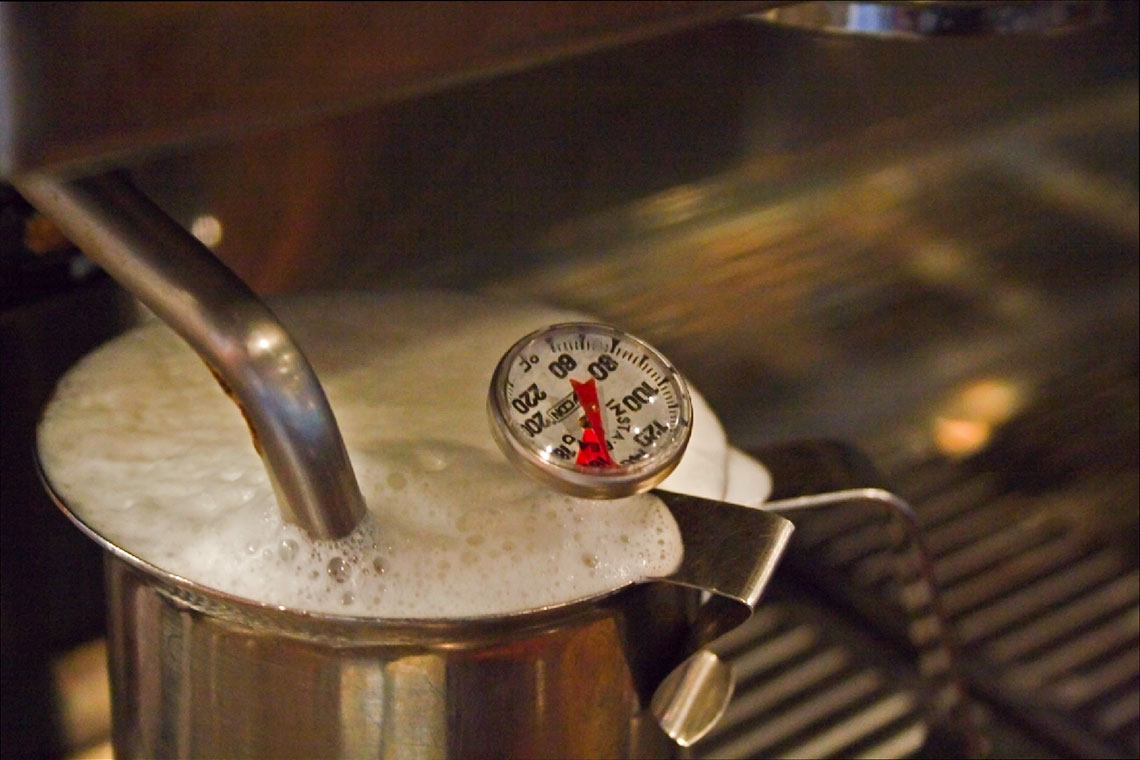
Milk being steamed

sautéing
score
To cut shallow grooves, often in a diamond pattern, into a cut of meat.
Schwenker
searing
A technique used in grilling, baking, braising, roasting, sautéing, etc., in which the surface of the food (usually meat, poultry, or fish) is cooked at high temperature until a crust forms from browning.
seasoning
separating eggs
shallow frying
shirred eggs
shrivelling
shuck
To remove the outer casing of a food item, such as an ear of corn or the shell of an oyster.
simmering
skimming
slow cooker
smoking
smothering
souring
sous-vide
thermal immersion circulator
spatchcock
Poultry or game that has been prepared for roasting or grilling by removing the backbone (and sometimes the sternum) and flattening it out before cooking.
spherification
steaming
food steamer
steeping
stewing
stir frying
straight dough
stuffing
An edible food mixture, often a starch, used to fill a cavity in another food item.
sugar panning
supreme
sweating
The gentle heating of vegetables in a little oil or butter, which usually results in tender, sometimes translucent, pieces.
Swissing
syringe
For injecting fillings in foods.

== T ==
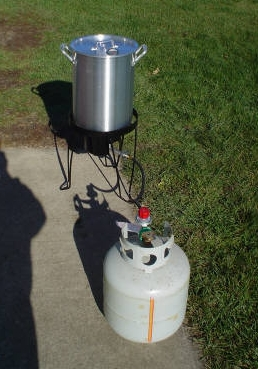
A turkey fryer

tandoor
A cylindrical clay or metal oven used in cooking and baking in Southern, Central, and Western Asia, as well as in the Caucasus.
Tataki
tempering
1. Tempering (chocolate), a method of increasing the shine and durability of chocolate couverture.
2. Tempering (cooking), bringing meat to room temperature before cooking; or bringing food up to temperature slowly as in sous vide.
3. Tempering (spices), a cooking technique and garnish used in the cuisines of India, Bangladesh, and Pakistan, in which whole spices (and sometimes also other ingredients such as minced ginger root or sugar) are fried briefly in oil or ghee to liberate essential oils from cells and thus enhance their flavours, before being poured, together with the oil, into a dish.
tenderizing
A process to break down collagens in meat to make it more palatable for consumption.
teriyaki
thermal cooking
Uses the concept of the haybox whereby placing hay or straw around a cooking pot of heated food the meal continues to cook without fuel.
thermization
A method of sterilizing raw milk with heat.
thickening
transglutaminase
A protein binder, called meat glue.
truss
To tie the legs and wings of poultry in a way that promotes even cooking.
turbo cooking
turkey fryer

== V ==
velveting
A technique which involves coating pieces of raw meat or poultry in a mixture of cornstarch and liquid prior to cooking, frequently used in Chinese cuisine.
Vietnamese cooking techniques
Many common culinary terms exist that are unique to Vietnam.

== W ==
whip
wok cooking
The wok is used in a significant amount of cooking methods.

== Z ==
zest
The colourful outer layer of citrus fruits, often scraped off and used as a flavouring ingredient.

== See also ==
- Lists of food and beverage topics
- Culinary arts
- Glossary of historical culinary terms
- Food science
  - Molecular gastronomy
  - Molecular mixology
  - Note by Note cuisine
- Food processing
- Meal preparation
- Outline of food preparation
