= Shallow frying =

Cooking by immersion in reduced amounts of hot oil

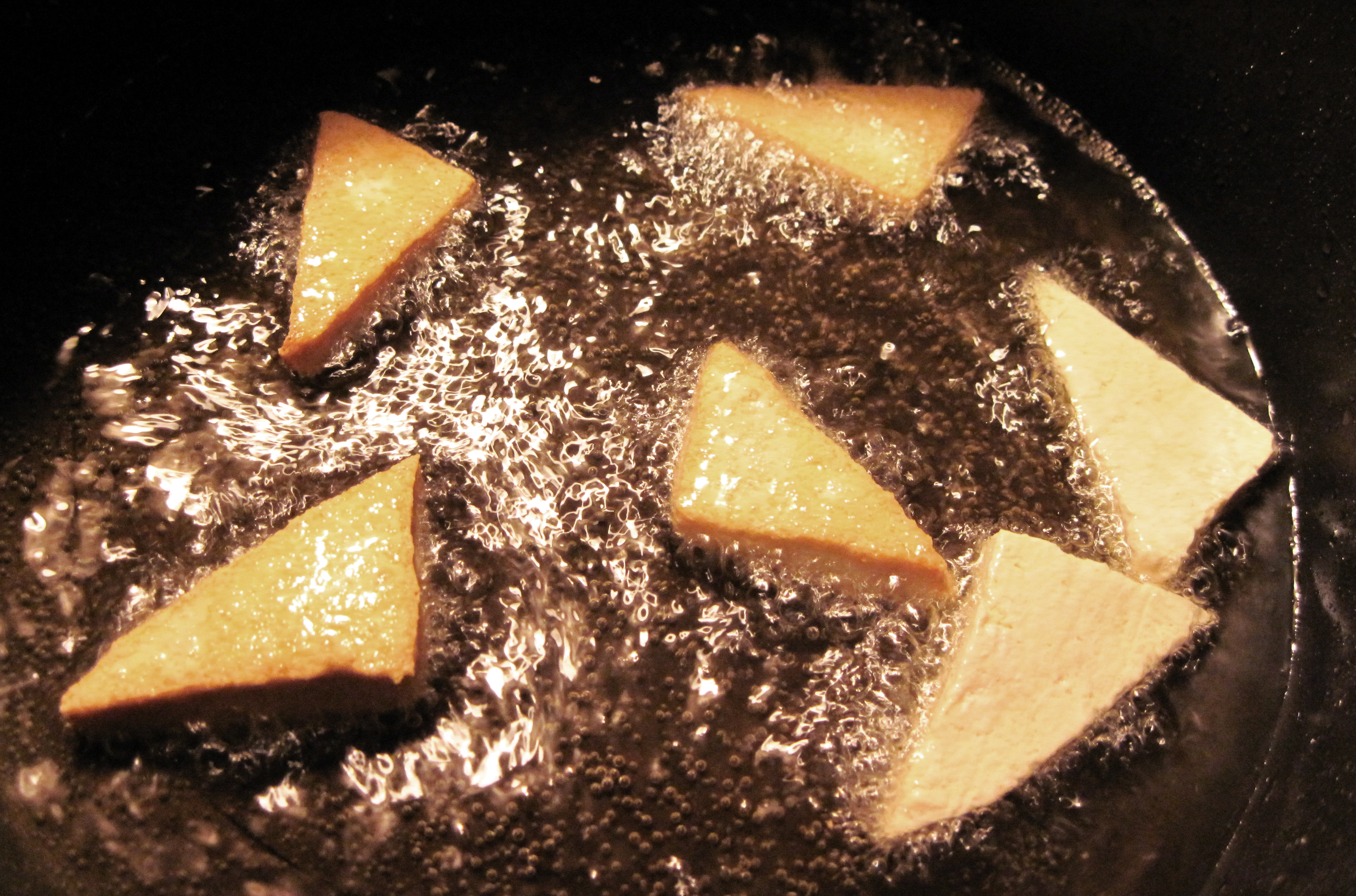
Triangular slices of tofu being shallow-fried in rice bran oil

Shallow frying is a hot oil-based cooking technique. Pieces of food are cooked by partial submersion in hot oil. It is typically used to prepare portion-sized cuts of meat, fish, potatoes and patties such as fritters. Shallow frying can also be used to cook vegetables.

Shallow frying is distinct from deep frying, which uses enough oil to fully submerge the food to be cooked, and pan frying, which only uses a negligible depth of oil.

== Technique ==
It is a medium-high to high heat cooking process. Temperatures between 160–190 °C (320–374 °F) are typical, but shallow frying may be performed at temperatures as low as 150 °C (302 °F) for a longer period of time. The high heat promotes protein denaturation-browning and, in some cases, a Maillard reaction. Deep frying usually takes place at temperatures between 177–205 °C (351–401 °F) so shallow-frying can oftentimes be considered a less intense cooking technique. Foods to be shallow fried are commonly pre-portioned into single servings before being placed in oil. Since the food is only partly submerged, it must be turned over partway through the cooking process. Some cooks recommend cooking the "presentation" side of the food first.

== Dishes ==
Both deep-fried and shallow-fried foods are often battered, breaded or floured (usually with wheat flour or corn starch) prior to being cooked; this step is sometimes referred to as breading, crumbing, velveting or dredging depending on the ingredients being used. The structure of these starchy coatings becomes rigid and porous when heated in oil; this is due to their high amylose content. Rigid coatings increase the palatability of fried food by inhibiting moisture loss and creating the desirable ‘crispiness’ trait.

== Health ==
The healthfulness of shallow frying has been scrutinized in literature. The results of a study on fish fry found that shallow frying fish provoked higher thermo-oxidation than cooking in a microwave. Studies have shown that margarine, virgin olive oil and similar cooking oils oxidize and destabilize substantially when they are shallow-fried, especially when compared to oils used during baking. In turn, a large amount of heat-sensitive nutrients may degrade, and antioxidant properties are lost. In this regard, shallow frying food may be a healthier alternative to long-term deep-frying processes. The fat-soluble vitamins and fatty acids in cooking oils show comparatively reasonable stability when they are used for shallow frying rather than deep frying.

Despite being a less intense frying method, the adverse effects of shallow frying are analogous to the ones associated with deep frying in some regards. The oil absorption rates of shallow-fried foods are similar to that of foods that have been deep-fried at proper temperatures; consequently, shallow-frying is not a better alternative for calorie control or weight management. Some research shows shallow frying and deep frying highly increased the acrylamide content in foods like potatoes and grains to a similar degree. Roasting the same potatoes kept acrylamide production comparatively low in spite of being cooked at a higher temperature setting. It is controversial whether dietary acrylamide poses a substantial danger, but since the Joint Food and Agriculture Organization/World Health Organization Expert Committee on Food Additives concluded that acrylamide is a human health concern there have been efforts to discover methods of decreasing its formation. It has been observed that blanching, pre-soaking food in either distilled water or acidulated water, and lowering frying temperature can all partially attenuate acrylamide formation.

== See also ==
- Pan frying
- Sautéing
- Sweating
- Browning
