= Anti-griddle =

Kitchen appliance

The anti-griddle is a kitchen appliance that flash freezes or semi-freezes foods placed on its chilled metal top. The equipment is about the size of a microwave oven.

Chef and Top Chef guest judge Grant Achatz developed the device with Philip Preston for use in his Chicago restaurant Alinea. He collaborated with the company Polyscience to mass-produce the anti-griddle for use at homes and other restaurants.

== Operation ==
The anti-griddle maintains a constant temperature of −30 °F (−34 °C) by pumping a refrigerant through a compressor to remove heat from its steel surface. Liquids, oil, and gels generally freeze in 30 to 90 seconds. The finished product has a crunchy outer texture while the inside remains soft or creamy.

== See also ==
- List of cooking techniques
- Molecular gastronomy
