= En vessie =

Cooking method

En vessie refers to a cooking method in which a meat or other dish is cooked in a (pig) bladder. A well-known application is with Bresse chicken: Poularde de Bresse en vessie; a prepared chicken is stuffed with foie gras, truffles, and other flavorings, then enclosed in the bladder and poached in chicken broth. The roots of the recipe go back to Auguste Escoffier, and this preparation was made famous by Paul Bocuse among other Lyonnais chefs.

The advantage of the method is that the meat does not come into contact with the cooking liquid; in Poularde de Bresse en vessie, the juices from the chicken all stay in the chicken, and turn into a flavorful jelly if the dish is served cold. The meat remains extremely moist. It has been likened to the cooking method of sous vide where meat is vacuum packed and cooked slowly in a water bath. A similar effect can be achieved by wrapping chicken in aluminum foil.

== See also ==
- List of cooking techniques
