= Velveting =

Chinese meat moisture preservation technique

Velveting is a technique in Chinese cuisine for preserving the moisture of meat while cooking. Additionally, it provides a soft or "velvety" texture to the meat.

Raw meat is coated in corn starch (and often egg white) and then par-cooked by briefly frying or blanching to set the coating. Shaoxing wine and soy sauce are often added for flavor. The meat can then be sautéed, stir-fried, deep-fried, simmered, or boiled. During cooking, the velveting mixture insulates the meat fibres from heat, preventing them from seizing, resulting in more tender meat. The starch also absorbs any moisture expelled from the cooking meat.

Velveting is often preceded by or combined with a tenderizing step using baking soda or papain.
