= Frying =

Cooking food in oil or fat

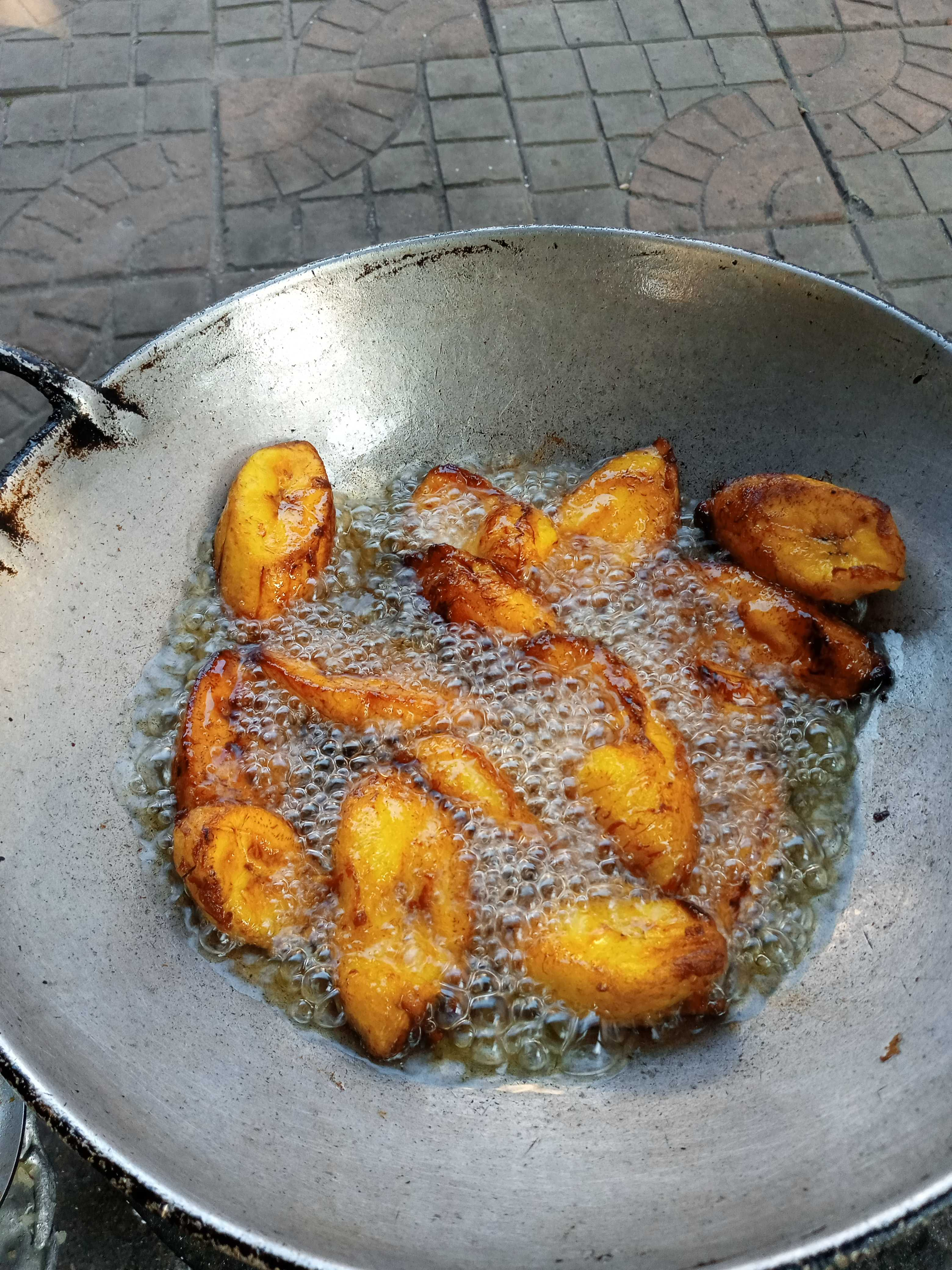
Fried plantain

Frying is a method of cooking where food is made in oil or animal fat. Frying first appeared in Ancient Egypt around 2500 BC, with tiger nut cakes deep fried in oil.

A variety of foods can be fried. The amount of oil or fat will usually affect the food's taste and texture. Foods fried in more oil, or deep fried, will typically be crispier or more tender, whereas foods fried in less oil, like shallow frying or pan frying, will usually still be crisp but to a lesser extent. Other methods utilize the movement of the food in the pan or using oil or fat with other sauces.

Frying is a process which involves the transfer of mass and heat. Using different oils to fry foods can have an effect on the food's fat content. Different foods absorb fat differently, which also can have an effect on the food's fat content. Fried foods have also been linked to heart disease, stomach cancer, and obesity.

== History ==
The earliest known depictions of frying come from Ancient Egyptian cuisine during the Old Kingdom, around 2500 BC. Ancient Egyptians would typically fry foods like tiger nut cakes in fat. In the tomb of Egyptian Vizier Rekhmire, who lived in the 15th century BC, there are depictions of workers putting small cakes in pots of oil or fat and instructions in hieroglyphics to fry the food.

During the Warring States period of the Zhou dynasty (475-221 BC), the Rites of Zhou and the Book of Rites were written and contained information and recipes for chun ao. (淳熬) Chun ao is fried, pickled meat paste poured on top of upland rice mixed with rendered animal fat.

In the late 2nd century AD, Greek cook Galen describes pancake-like griddle cakes made with sesame seeds and fried in olive oil over a fire. Later, in the 5th century AD, the Roman cookbook Apicius describes a Delian sweet from the Greek island Delos. The dessert is made with hardened wheat paste that is then deep fried in oil. Commonly, the Delian sweets are covered in honey and pepper before being served.

== Process ==
When in contact with oil heated to 150–200 °C (302–392 °F), food undergoes heat and mass transfer. The food's water content reaches boiling point and begins to vaporize, creating pores in its cell walls which enable it to absorb oil. As heat exposure is greater on the surface of the food in direct contact with the oil, water vaporization occurs more quickly. This dehydration effect causes a crisp crust to form which protects the center of the food against further oil absorption.

The crust browns due to the formation of melanoidins caused by caramelization and the Maillard reaction. The food's starch content gelatinizes, causing it to soften; the surface contains less water and retains its crisp crust. Frying is complete when all water content in the food vaporizes. When a fried food reduces in temperature below 100 °C (212 °F), water vapor inside condenses and internal pressure drops, causing oil absorption into the food via a vacuum effect.

== Techniques ==
=== Air frying ===
In air frying, food is placed in an air fryer with a small amount of oil and then heated to an extreme temperature. Compared to other methods of frying, air frying foods produces foods with a lower content of fat and calories.

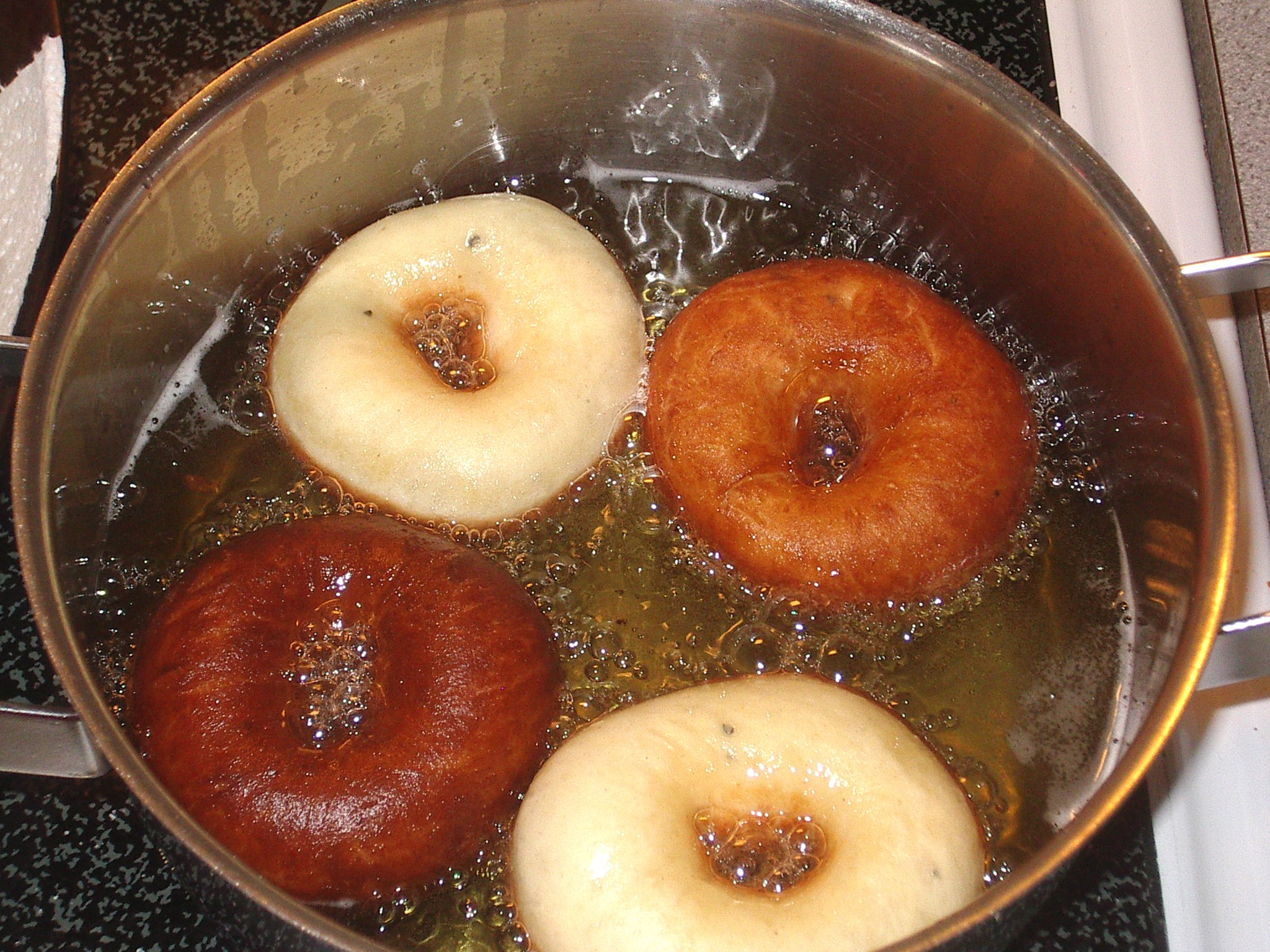
Smultring being deep fried

=== Deep frying ===
In deep frying, food is submerged in hot oil or fat so that all sides are cooked simultaneously. A deep fryer or chip pan may be used, or, in an industrial frying operation, a pressure fryer or vacuum fryer. One method for preparing food for deep frying involves battering or breading, which adds color and crunch to its surface. French fries, doughnuts, cong you bing, and tempura are common deep-fried foods.

=== Sautéing ===
In sautéing, food is tossed over high heat in a frying pan with a small amount oil to prevent sticking. A shallow pan or sauté pan are what is typically used for sautéing foods. Sauté pans usually have higher sides to prevent food from exiting the pan while tossing.

=== Shallow frying ===
In shallow frying, also known as pan frying, food is partially submerged and fried in shallow oil on one side until browned, then flipped to cook the other side.

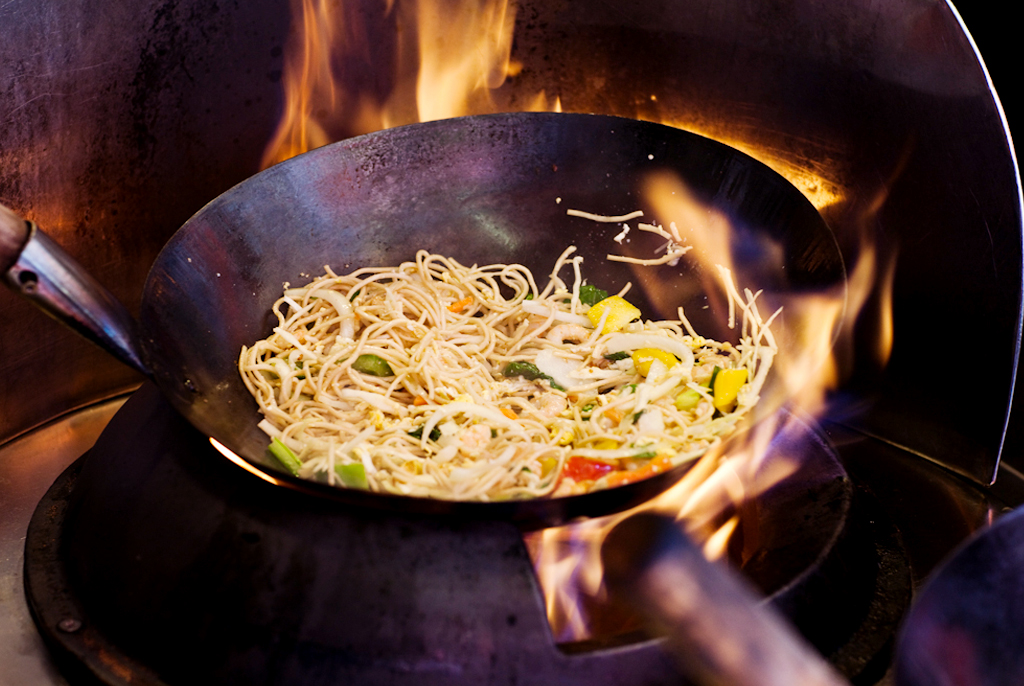
A wok being used to stir fry

=== Stir frying ===
Stir frying is a Chinese, high-heat technique using a wok in which ingredients are constantly stirred for even cooking. The base of the wok is placed directly in the fire and its concave shape allows the flames to envelop the bowl; the base of the wok can reach 400 °C (752 °F). Frying is finished in two to three minutes.

== Health effects ==
A 2021 meta-analysis found that the highest category of fried food consumption compared to the lowest is associated with a 3% increase in the risk of all-cause mortality, as well as with a 2% increase in the risk of cardiovascular mortality. Compared to participants with a low intake, those who ate the most fried food had a 37% increased risk of heart failure, a 28% increased risk of major cardiovascular events, and a 22% increased risk of coronary heart disease. The risk of stroke, heart failure, and heart attack modestly increased with the increase of weekly servings of fried food. The study concluded that fried food consumption may increase the risk of cardiovascular disease and presents a linear dose-response relation. It was also noted that eating hyperpalatable crisp-fried foods may entice people to engage in routine overeating.

A 2023 meta-analysis found that fried food consumption is linked to a 52% increase in the risk of stomach cancer. Fried food intake is also associated with prehypertension, hypertension and obesity.

=== Nutrition ===
Due to oil absorption during frying, the nutritional profile of the oil used becomes part of the final product; up to 75% of calories can be from fat in fried foods. 15% of battered chicken or fish’s final weight is absorbed frying oil, compared to 20% when breaded. Doughnuts’ final weight is between 15–20% frying oil, and this figure increases to up to 35–40% for potato chips.

Vitamins like thiamin, riboflavin, and vitamin A are unstable at high temperatures and vitamin C is water soluble, meaning they can be lost from fried foods during water evaporation. Vitamin A is particularly unstable—24% of vitamin A is destroyed during frying compared to 14% when boiled due to oxidation. Fiber increases in fried foods due to the formation of brown melanoidins, which form part of the crust. The proportion of protein also increases due to the concentrating effects of dehydration, with the exception of amino acid lysine due to its role in the Maillard reaction. Minerals increase in concentration in the same way, but this means that heavy metals found in some fish are also concentrated during frying.

=== Fume inhalation ===
Toxic compounds are produced during frying and evaporate with steam, which can irritate lung tissue if inhaled. Fumes from frying have been classified as possibly cancer-causing by the International Agency for Research on Cancer.

== Effects of oil ==
During frying, oil is exposed to water from food, high temperatures, and oxygen from the surroundings, which cause degradation. Hydrolysis causes an oil's smoke point to decrease and oxidation causes the formation of volatile compounds which change the flavor, quality, and texture of the food. These are mostly toxic aldehydes, of which some amount is required to achieve a characteristic fried smell and taste. Oils have varying proportions of saturated, monounsaturated, and polyunsaturated fats which change their performance during frying.

=== Monounsaturated fats ===
Rapeseed oil, also known as canola oil, is the third most used frying oil, especially in northern Europe, Japan, Oceania, and Canada. Despite mostly comprising monounsaturated fat, its high linolenic acid content makes it prone to oxidation. Peanut oil, also known as groundnut oil, is commonly used in west Africa but, unlike rapeseed oil, is low in linolenic acid. Olive oil is stable at high temperatures because of its high monounsaturated fat and antioxidant content, which make it less likely to oxidize during frying and improves the nutritional content of fried foods. It degrades two times as slowly as sunflower oil and ten times as slowly as linseed oil. Its widespread use may be the cause of fried food consumption not being linked to increased mortality in Mediterranean countries.

=== Polyunsaturated fats ===
Polyunsaturated fats are most prone to oxidation and polymerization, which form toxic compounds that are absorbed by food. A 2022 WHO review and meta-analysis of 170 studies found that polyunsaturated fat consumption reduced overall mortality, but that higher quality evidence was needed. Sunflower oil is most commonly used in eastern Europe. Despite being a source of vitamin E, its high polysaturated fat content makes it poor for frying. Sunflower oil is sold with added oleic acid to increase its monounsaturated fat content and therefore its stability.

=== Saturated fats ===
Palm oil is the most common oil, especially in sub-Saharan Africa, southeast Asia, and some parts of South America. Its saturated and unsaturated fat content are nearly equal, but is slightly more saturated. It has a high palmitic acid content, which is linked to heart disease.

=== Oil reuse ===
Oil is reused in industrial frying to reduce costs, but prolonged use causes oxidation, producing aldehydes that affect flavor and increase cancer risks. Unsaturated fats oxidize more quickly than saturated fats, and oils with high linolenic acid content can result fish-like smell. Oil reuse reduces the nutritional value of foods and increases saturated and trans fats while reducing monounsaturated and polyunsaturated fats. Foods fried in reused oil absorb more.

=== Fire risks ===
Oil or fat with a smoke point below 200 °C (392 °F) may foam and rise, spilling and causing a fire. Foaming can be distinguished from bubbles caused by water evaporation because the foam covers the whole surface of the oil, not just above the food. Blended oils are more prone to foaming. Oil with a flash point below 315 °C (599 °F) may explode.

== See also ==
- Convection oven
- French fries
- Fried rice
- Fried chicken
- List of fried dough foods
