= Sweating (cooking) =

Cooking technique

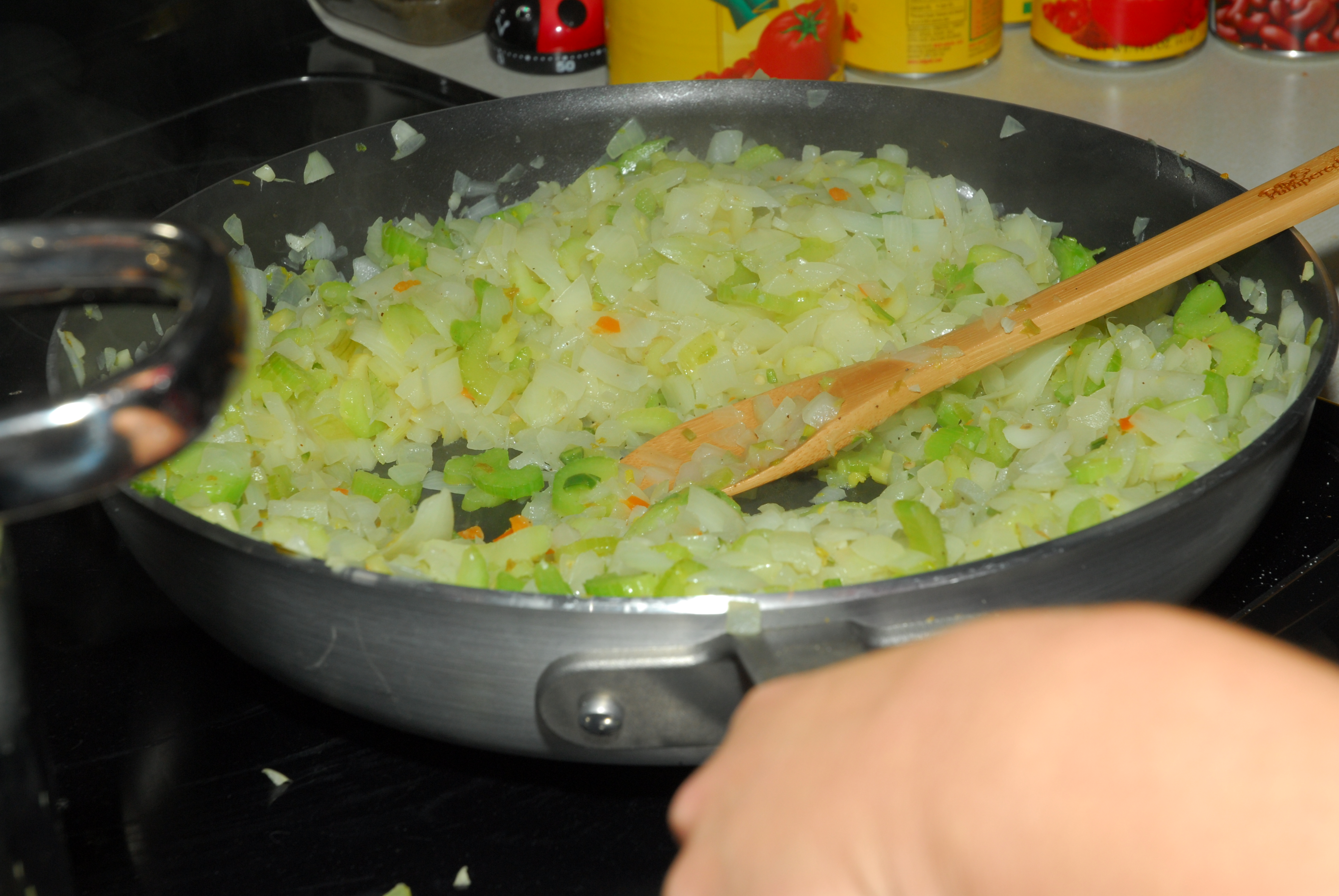
Vegetables being sweated, showing a lack of browning

Sweating in cooking is the gentle heating of vegetables in a little oil or butter, with frequent stirring and turning to ensure that any emitted liquid will evaporate. Sweating usually results in tender, sometimes translucent, pieces. Sweating is often a preliminary step to further cooking in liquid; onions, in particular, are often sweated before including in a stew. (Note: "While European cooks start most stews by gently sweating aromatic vegetables such as onions, carrots, celery, and garlic as a gently flavored mirepoix or soffritto, most Indian cooks rely most heavily on onions. And instead of the gentle ...") This differs from sautéing in that sweating is done over a much lower heat, sometimes with salt added to help draw moisture away, and making sure that little or no browning takes place.

The sweating of vegetables has been used as a technique in the preparation of coulis.

In Italy, this cooking technique is known as soffritto, meaning "sub-frying" or "under-frying". In Italian cuisine, it is a common technique and preliminary step in the preparation of risotto, soups and sauces.

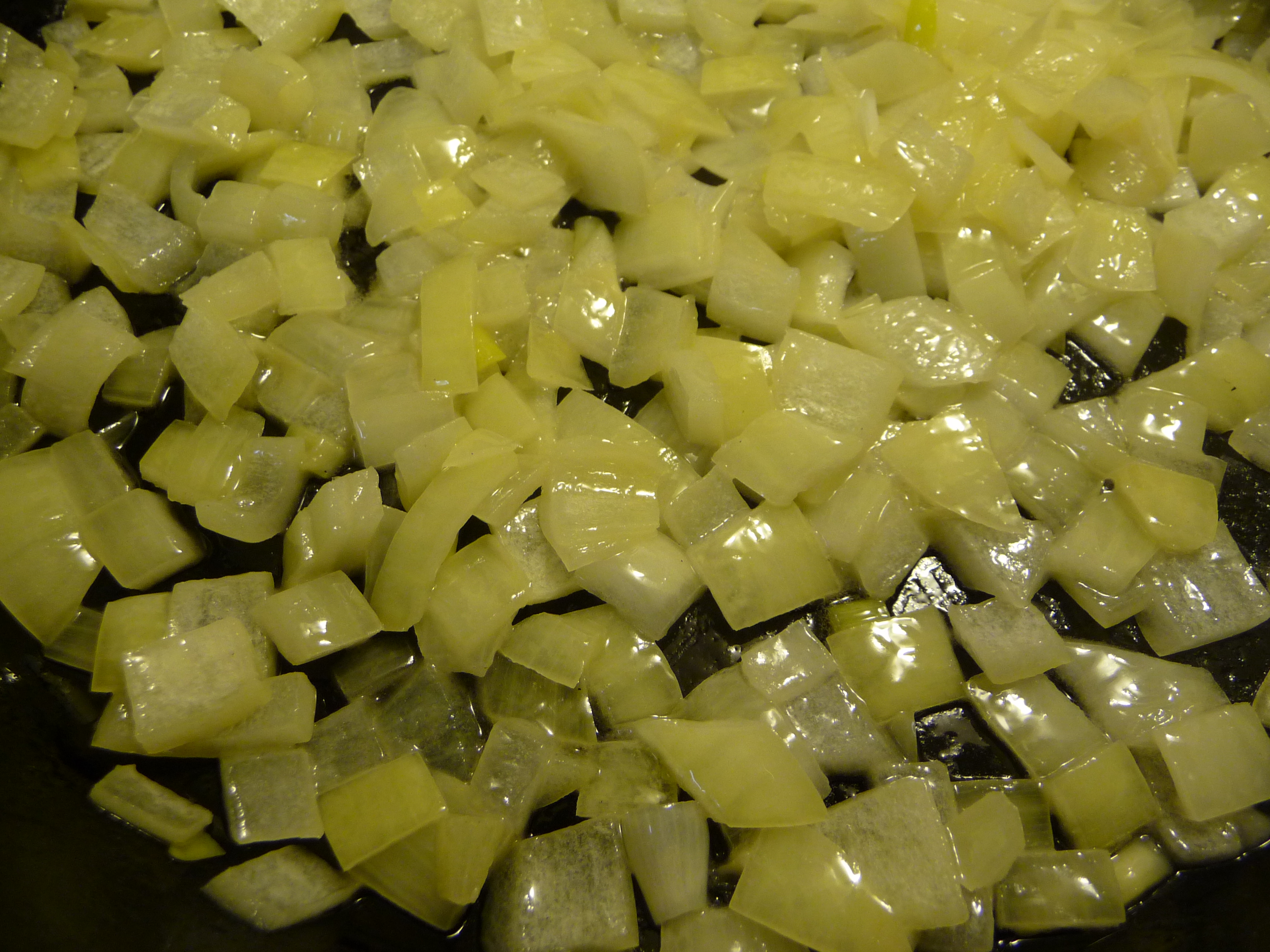
Close-up view of sweated onions

== See also ==
- Braising
- Frying
- Sautéing
