= Escagraph =

Writing on food

The term "escagraph" was first used in the 1980s by Dr. Larry R. Smith to identify and describe the many forms, past and present, of writing on food and letters as food. The term is a concatenation of esca (from Latin meaning "victuals" or "things to be eaten") and graph (after the Greek meaning: "mark" or the infinitive verb "to write").

== History ==
Research has identified examples of escagraphs as far back as Ancient Egypt and the Roman Empire, primarily bread with words stamped into them prior to baking. Use of escagraphs waned a bit during periods of early Christianity to the 19th century, though some interesting examples exist in bread assizes and sotelties.

== Examples ==
=== Sweet ===
Most forms of escagraphs today are sweet, either molded into or drawn onto the surface of the food. Cakes with "Happy Birthday" are extremely common. Heart-shaped candies with mottoes on them have been produced since about 1901 and are often shared at Valentine's Day. Many chocolate bars bear the name of their maker imprinted on their surface.

=== Lawful ===
Only a few lawful examples remain, since the bread assizes of the 15th century. However, the United States Department of Agriculture does mark certain meat products with certifications and grades in an edible ink.

=== Moveable type ===
From alphabet cookies to cereal to pasta, letters and moveable type are still common today. Throughout the western world, cookies shaped as letters are made both as edible toys and ostensibly to help children learn their letters. Many manufacturers provide alphabet pasta letters (and numbers) in both ready-to-eat and dry forms.
