= Dredging (cooking) =

Cooking technique

Dredging is a cooking technique used to coat wet or moist foods with a dry ingredient prior to cooking. Put simply, dredging involves little more than pulling or rolling the wet food through the dry material to provide an even coating. The technique is particularly common with breaded foods, such as fried fish or chicken cutlets.

== Advantages of dredging ==
There are several reasons for dredging food before sautéing or frying:

- The flour and other dry ingredients seal in moisture to prevent the food from becoming tough.
- The coating applied to the food acts as a barrier that keeps the food from sticking to the pan as it cooks.
- The coating helps to the food and provide a crunchy surface.
- The coating enables the exterior of the food to become crisp and darken evenly without burning.
- The seasoning in the coating adds flavor to the food.

== See also ==
- List of cooking techniques
