= Pan frying =

Cooking technique

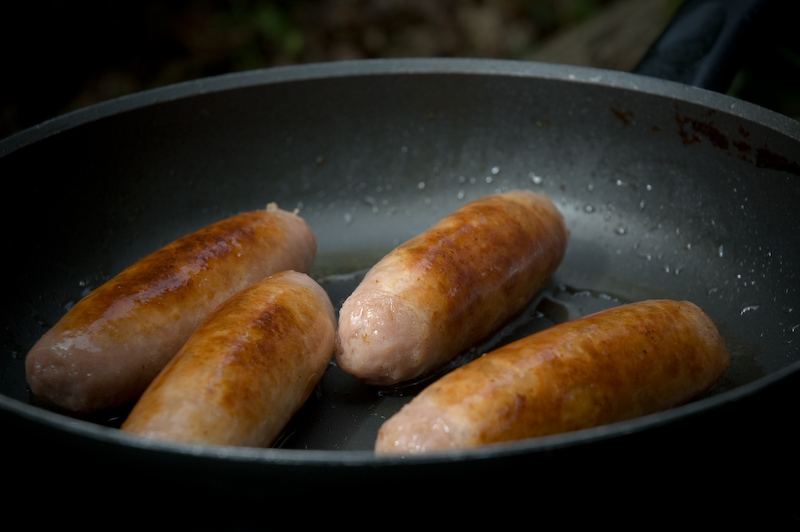
Pan frying sausages can make use of the inherent fat of the meat.

Pan frying or pan-frying is a form of frying food characterized by the use of minimal cooking oil or fat (compared to shallow frying or deep frying), typically using just enough to grease the pan. In the case of a greasy food such as bacon, no oil or fats may need to be added. As a form of frying, the technique relies on oil or fat as the heat transfer medium, and on correct temperature and time to not overcook or burn the food. Pan frying can serve to retain the moisture in foods such as meat and seafood. The food is typically flipped at least once to ensure that both sides are cooked properly.

== Specifics ==
Pan frying uses lower heat than sautéing. This is because foods that are often pan fried, such as chicken breasts, steak, pork chops, or fish fillets require a lower heat to prevent overcooking or burning. However, the oil must be hot enough to ensure that the moisture in the food can escape in the form of steam, which keeps the oil from soaking into the food. The same amount of oil is used as for sautéing – just enough to glaze the pan.

== Equipment ==
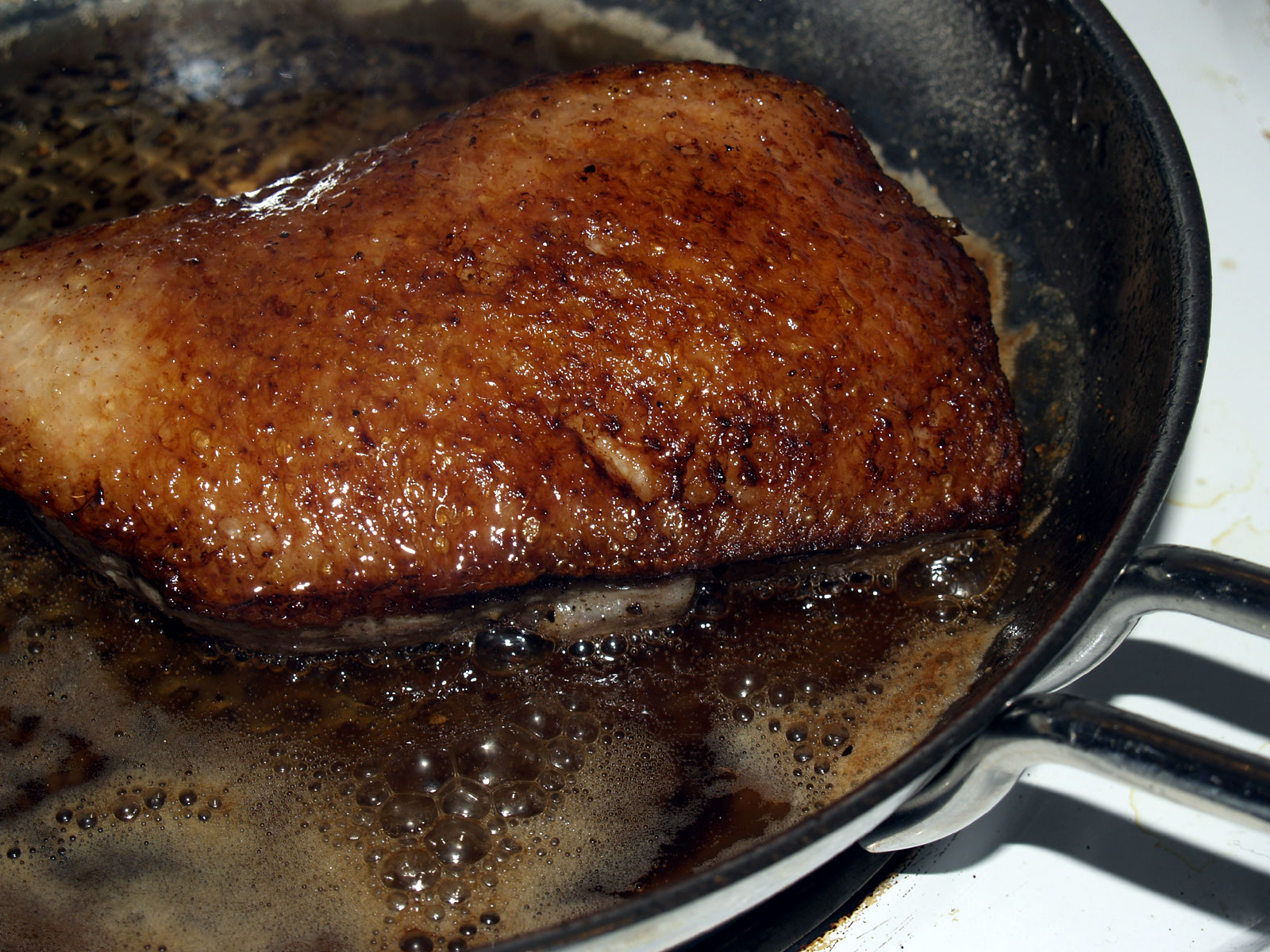
Duck meat being pan fried

Generally, a shallower cooking vessel is used for pan frying than for deep frying; however, using a deep pan with a small amount of oil, butter or bacon grease does reduce spatter. A denser cooking vessel is better than a less dense pan because the added mass will improve temperature regulation. An electric skillet can be used analogously to an electric deep fryer, and many of these devices have a thermostat to keep the liquid (in this case, oil) at the desired temperature.

== Breading ==
Foods to be pan fried are sometimes covered with a batter or breading. Batters consist of dried ingredients such as flour or cornstarch in conjunction with liquids such as milk, water or other beverages. Breading can be as simple as dusting the food in flour or, more commonly, what is called the "standard breading procedure", which involves first dusting the food in flour (taking care to shake off the excess), then dipping it in beaten eggs, and finally putting it into bread crumbs (or some other form of outer coating). The food is seasoned with salt and pepper prior to applying any coating. Allowing the food to rest for 15–30 minutes before frying but after applying the breading enables the coating to adhere to the food with greater tenacity.

== See also ==
- Frying
  - Deep frying
  - Shallow frying
  - Frying pan
- Sautéing
