= Sautéing =

Cooking method

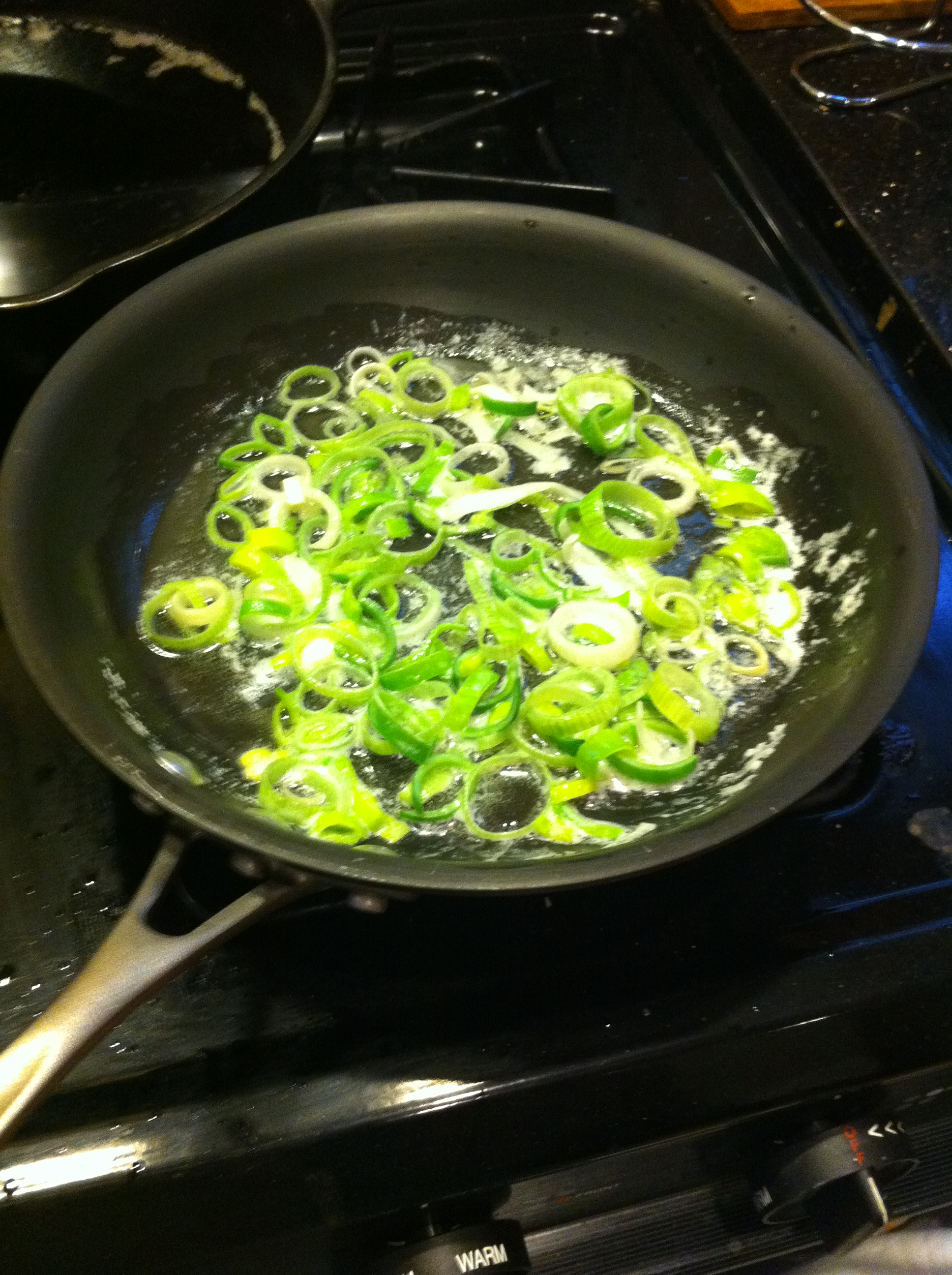
Leeks being sautéed

Sautéing or sauteing (UK: /ˈsoʊteɪ.ɪŋ/, US: /soʊˈteɪ.ɪŋ, sɔː-/; from French sauté [sote] 'jumped, bounced', in reference to tossing while cooking) is a method of cooking that uses a relatively small amount of oil or fat in a shallow pan over relatively high heat. Various sauté methods exist.

== Description ==
Ingredients for sautéing are usually cut into small pieces or thinly sliced to provide a large surface area, which facilitates fast cooking. The primary mode of heat transfer during sautéing is conduction between the pan and the food being cooked. Food that is sautéed is browned while preserving its texture, moisture, and flavor. If meat, chicken, or fish is sautéed, the sauté is often finished by deglazing the pan's residue to make a sauce.

Sautéing may be compared with pan frying, in which larger pieces of food (for example, chops or steaks) are cooked quickly in oil or fat, and flipped onto both sides. Some cooks make a distinction between the two based on the depth of the oil used, while others use the terms interchangeably.

Sautéing differs from searing in that searing only browns the surface of the food.

Certain oils should not be used to sauté due to their low smoke point. Clarified butter, rapeseed oil and sunflower oil are commonly used for sautéing; whatever the fat, it must have a smoke point high enough to allow cooking on medium-high heat, which is the temperature at which sautéing is done. For example, although regular butter would impart more flavor, it would also burn at a lower temperature and more quickly than other fats due to the presence of milk solids. Clarified butter is more suitable for this use.

== Methods ==
In a sauté, all the ingredients are heated at once and cooked quickly. To facilitate this, the ingredients are rapidly moved around in the pan, either by the use of a utensil or by repeatedly jerking the pan itself. A sauté pan must be large enough to hold all of the food in one layer, so steam can escape, which keeps the ingredients from stewing and promotes the development of fond. Most pans sold specifically as sauté pans have a wide flat base and low sides, to maximize the surface area available for heating. The low sides allow quick evaporation and escape of steam. While skillets typically have flared or rounded sides, sauté pans typically have straight vertical sides. This keeps the ingredients from escaping as the pan is jerked or stirred.

Only enough fat to lightly coat the bottom of the pan is needed for sautéing; too much fat will cause the food to fry rather than just to slide, and may interfere with the development of fond. The food is spread across the hot fat in the pan, and left to brown, turning or tossing frequently for even cooking. The sauté technique involves gripping the handle of the sauté pan firmly and using a sharp elbow motion to rapidly jerk the pan back toward the cook, repeating as necessary to ensure the ingredients have been thoroughly jumped. Tossing or stirring the items in the pan by shaking the pan too often, however, can cause the pan to cool and make the sauté take longer.

Sautéing

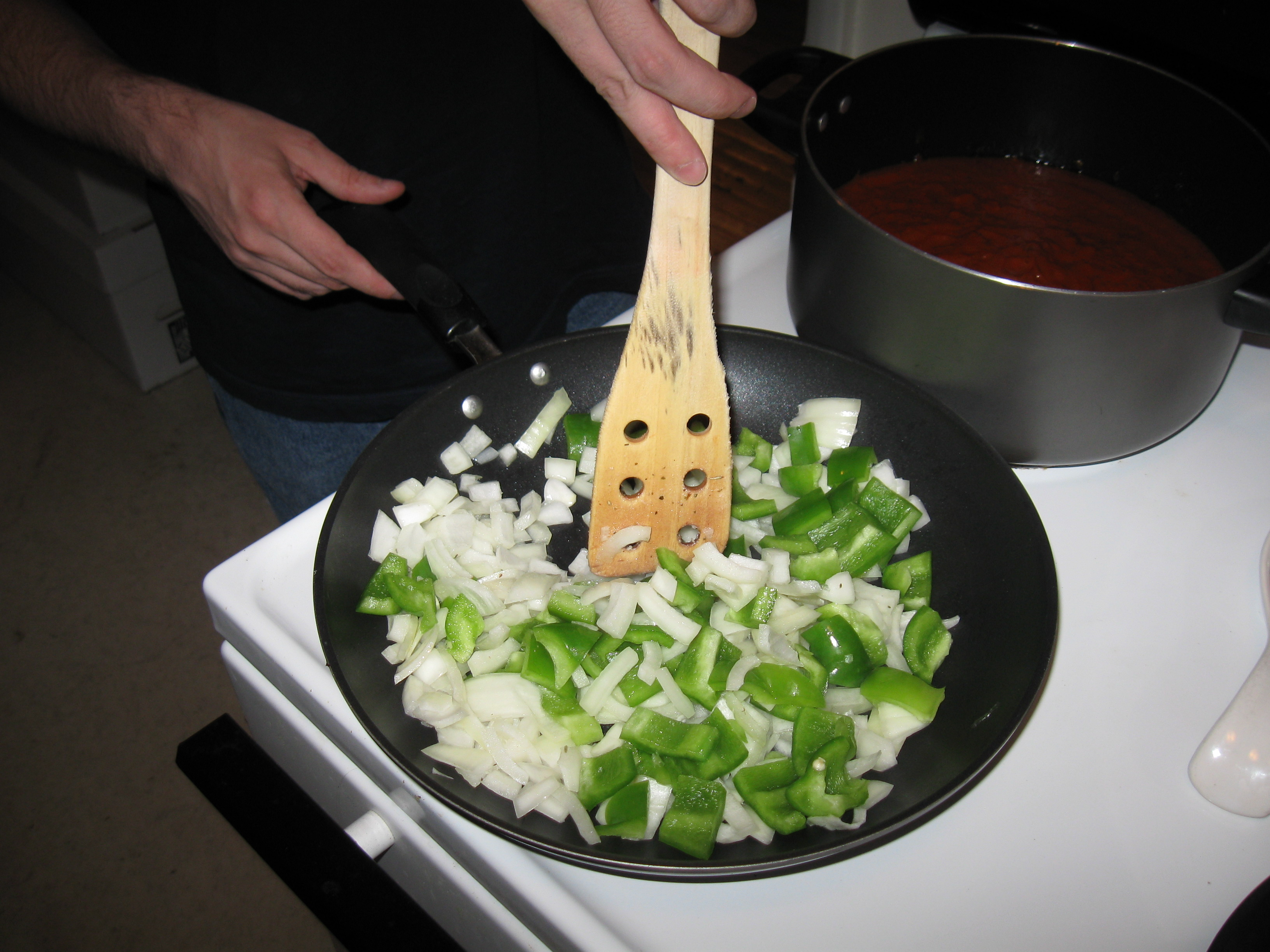
Sautéing onions and peppers

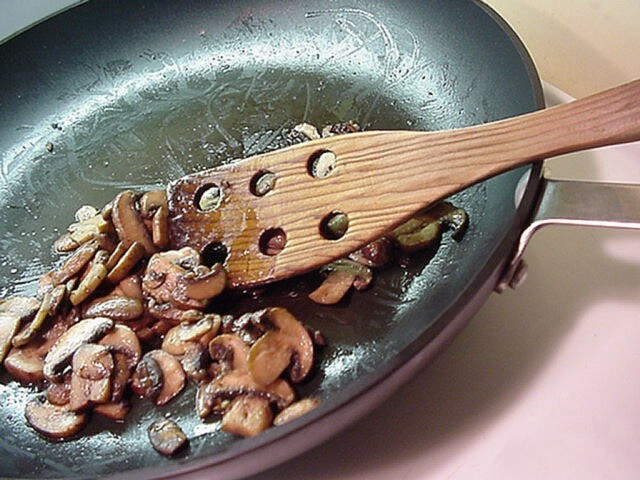
Sautéed mushrooms: baby Bella (portobello) mushrooms being sautéed

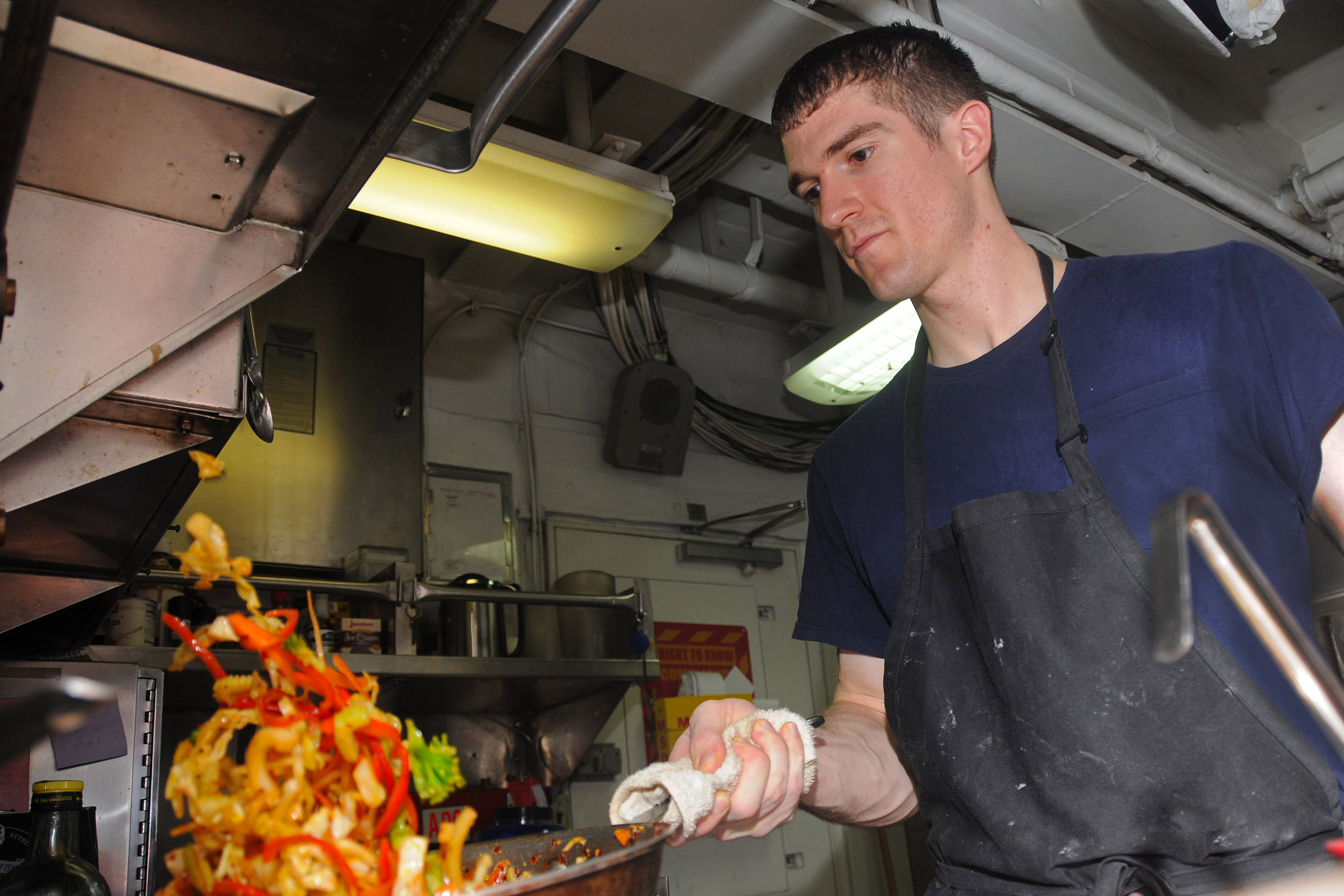
Sautéed vegetables being tossed in a sauté pan

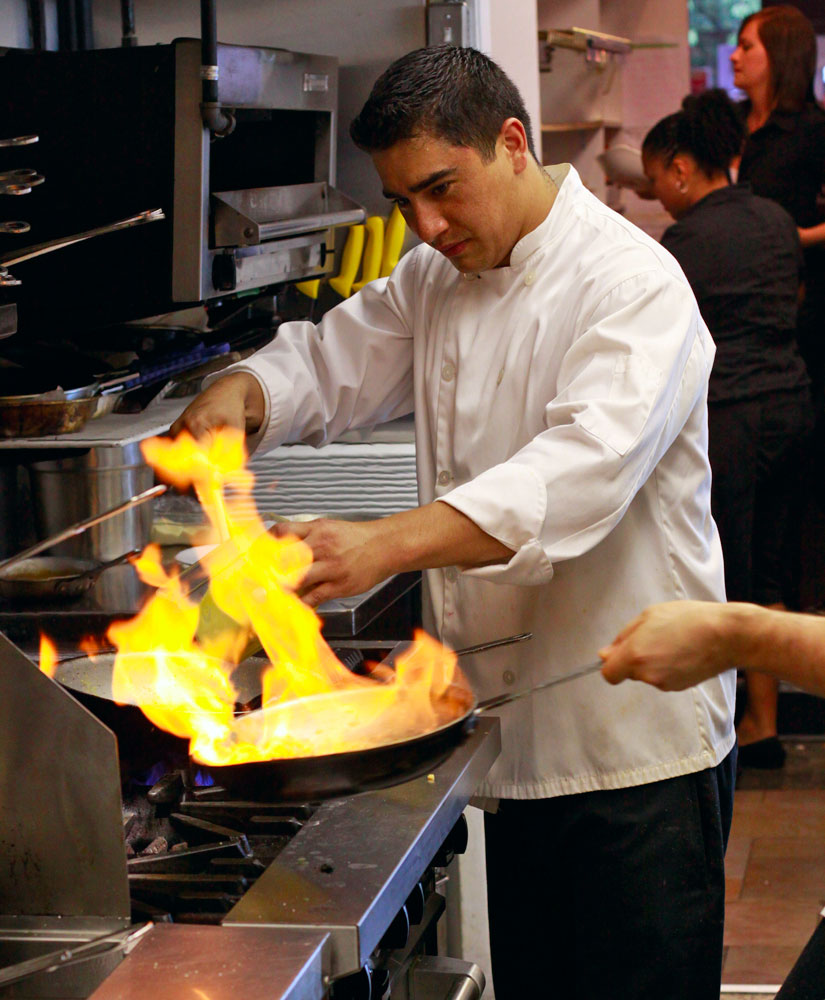
Flambéing in a sauté pan

== See also ==
- Pan frying
- Saucier
- Stir frying
- Sweating (cooking)
- Tempering (spices)
