= Dunakavics =

Hungarian candy

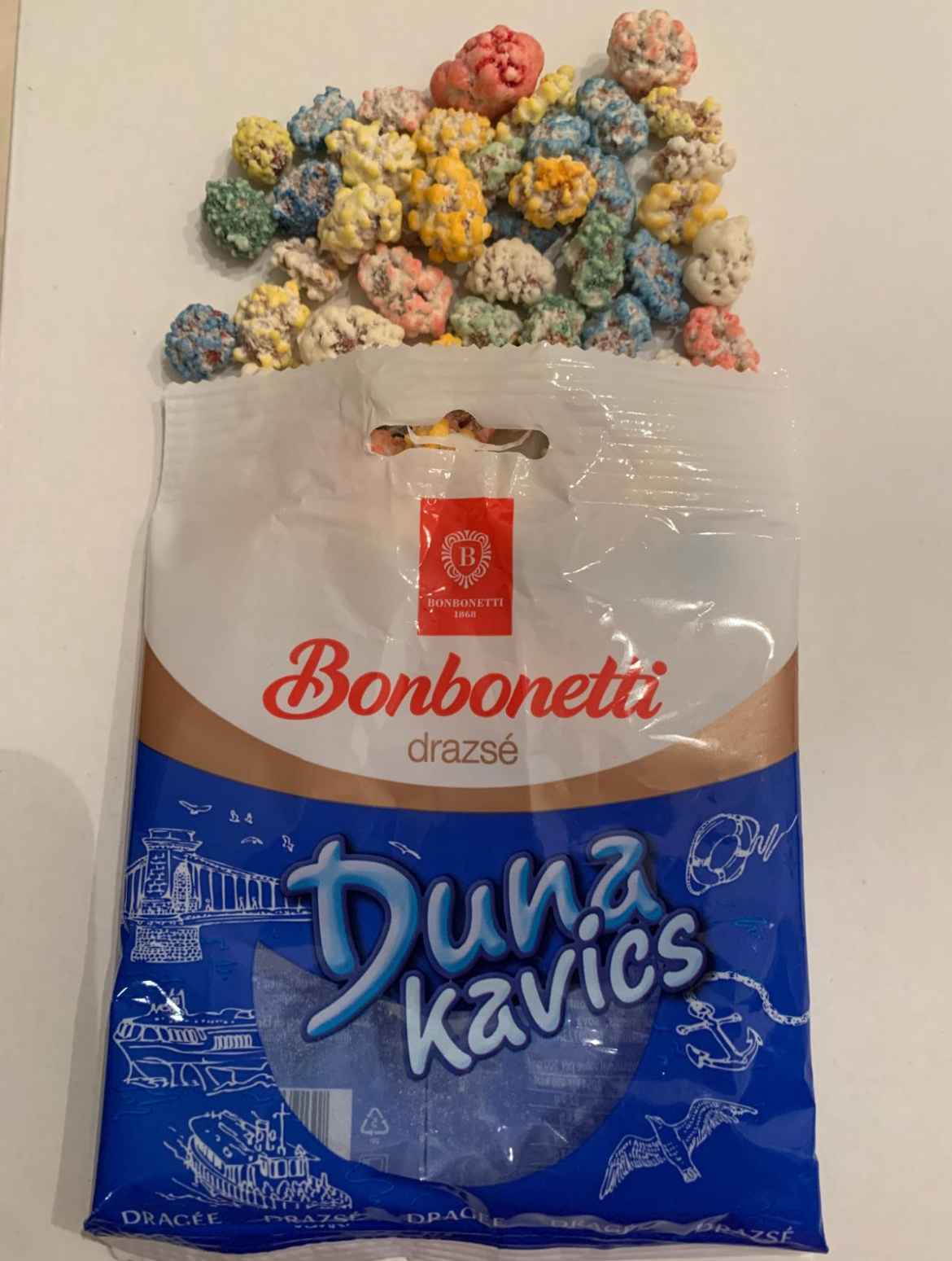
Dunakavics candy

Dunakavics is a Hungarian candy made of crunchy roasted peanuts coated with sugar. The candy comes in various colors similar to M&M's dragées. First produced in the 1960s, Dunakavics has been considered as bringing back a feeling of nostalgia into the retro years of Hungary. The Dunakavics brand has survived for over 60 years. This traditional Hungarian sweet treat, sold by Bonbonetti (a confectioner owned by Roshen since 2012), has been widely distributed in its original blue packaging within the country.

== History ==
In 1964, the production of Dunakavics began at the Danube Chocolate Factory, and it has been made with the same recipe ever since. The name originates from the uneven sugar coating, which makes the dragées resemble pebbles found along the Danube.

Most of the candies considered retro today were created around the 1960s. Retro in Hungary developed from the comeback of older branded products, brought back in both new and retro styles. Dunakavics is remembered by older generations as a retro Hungarian candy, which enjoyed its peak popularity in the 1960s, 70s, and 80s. For some, Hungarian retro evokes nostalgia for a time of perceived national pride, economic independence, and strength.

A significant portion of the sweets came from factories in Budapest. This remained true until the regime change in the 90s. The "Budapest Confectionery Enterprise" (Budapest Édesipari Vállalat) was among the first to be privatized. The spread of Dunakavics was influenced by the factory originally founded by Frigyes Stühmer. According to news reports at the time, the young master's goal was to free Hungarians from low-quality candies that contained substances dangerous to health.

== Production ==
The Dunakavics confectionery produced by Bonbonetti consists of roasted peanuts coated in a colorful sugar shell. This candy is made up of 46% sugar, glucose syrup, various colorings, a glazing agent, flavoring, and a small amount of hazelnut.

Furthermore, the preparation of this confection begins with combining water and sugar in a heated pot, where the two ingredients are stirred until they achieve a uniform mixture. As the mixture begins to bubble, the sides of the pot are greased to facilitate the caramelization process. Subsequently, various food colorings are added to separate bowls, followed by the incorporation of the caramelized mixture. After this stage, peanuts are introduced into each bowl, and the contents are thoroughly mixed to ensure that the nuts are completely coated with the caramel. Finally, the completed treats are placed on parchment paper to cool before consumption.
