= Glaze (cooking) =

Cooking technique

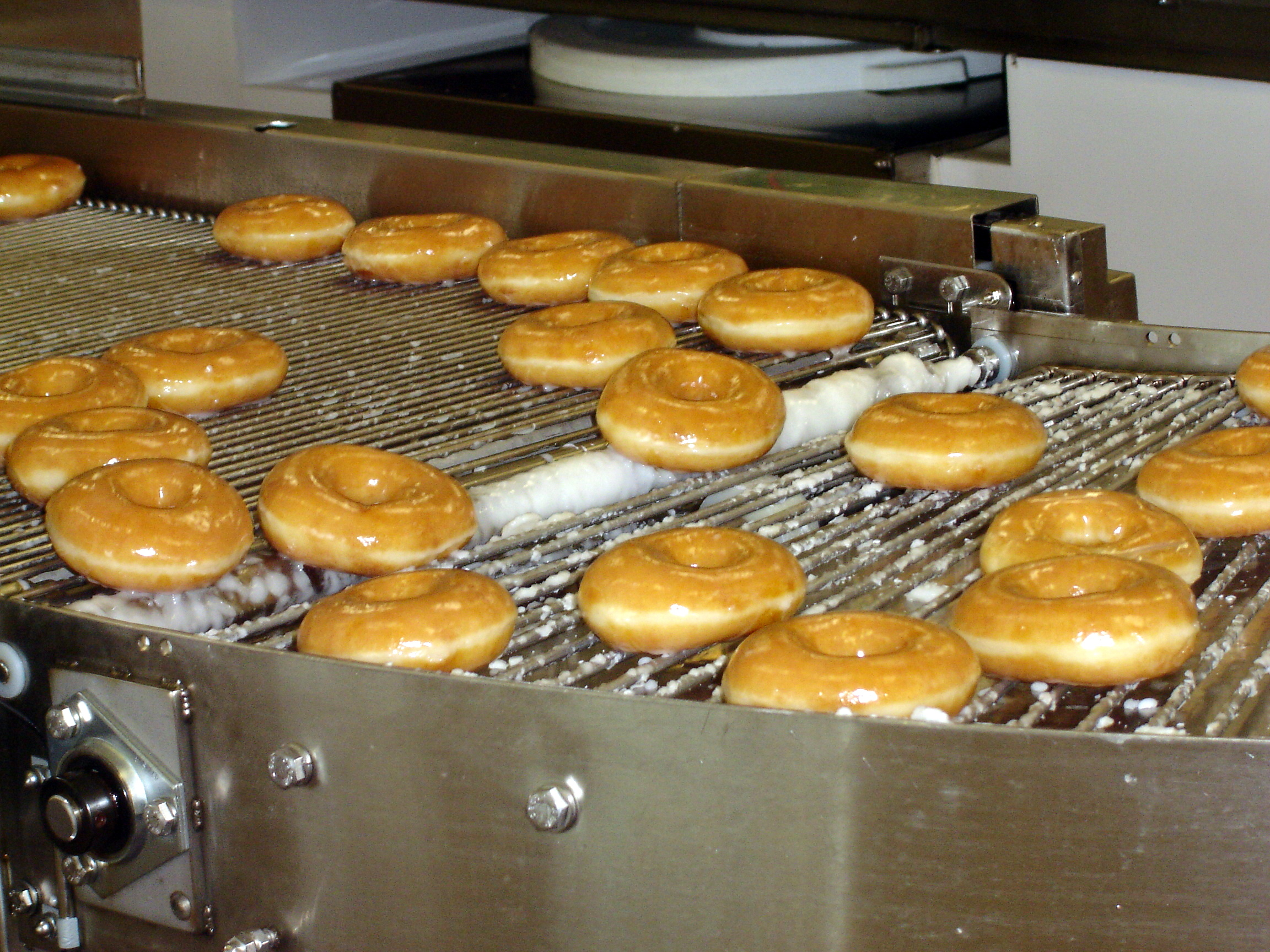
Recently applied glaze dripping off of doughnuts, on an open, moving drying rack

In cooking, a glaze is a glossy, translucent coating applied to the outer surface of a dish by dipping, dripping, or using a brush. Depending on its nature and intended effect, a glaze may be applied before or after cooking. It may be either sweet or savory (in pâtisserie, the former is known as glaçage); typical glazes include brushed egg whites, some types of icing, and jam (as in nappage), and may or may not include butter, sugar, milk, oil, and fruit or fruit juice.

== Examples ==
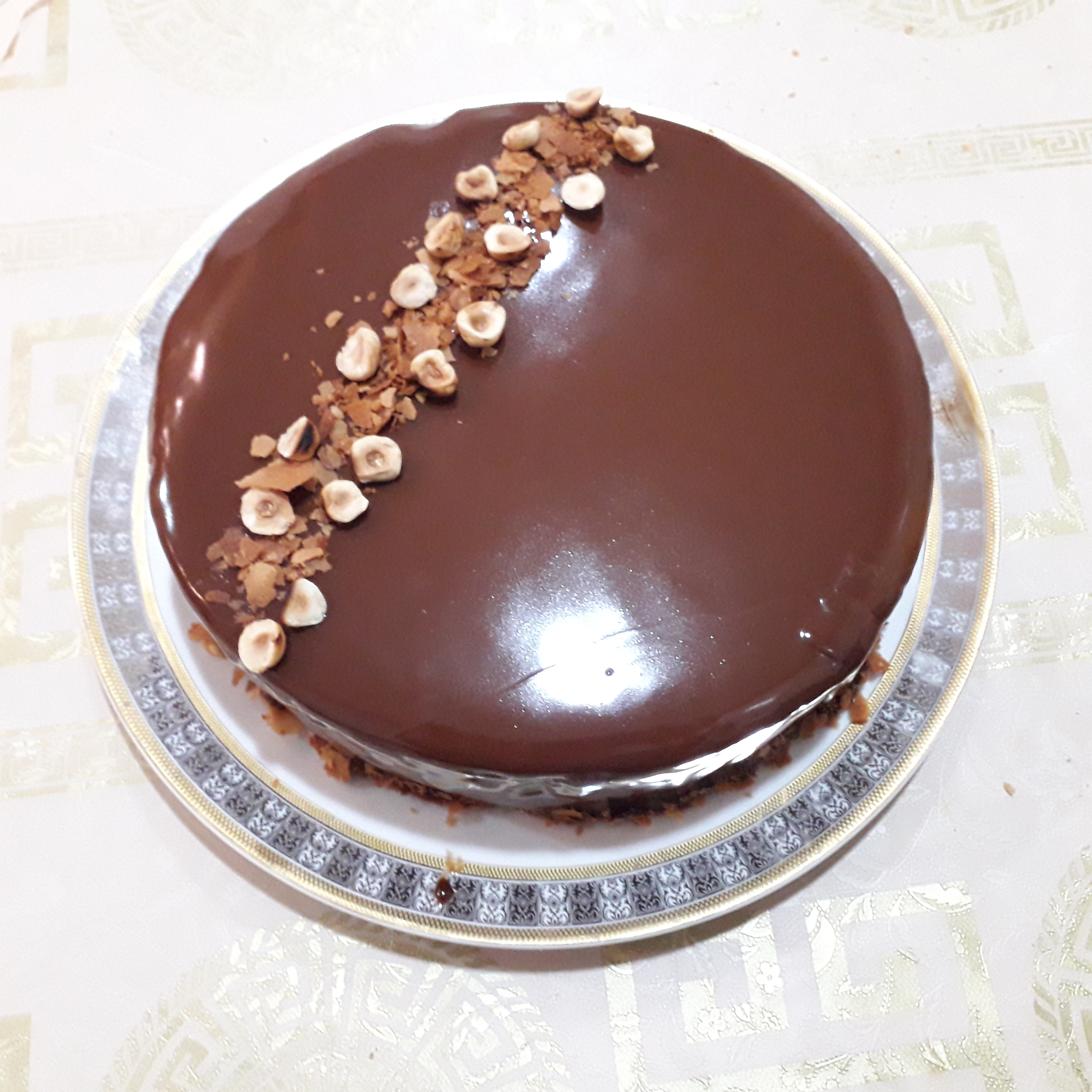
Mirror glaze on an entremet.

Doughnut glaze is made from a simple mixture of confectioner's sugar and water, which is then poured over the doughnuts. Some pastries have a coating of egg whites brushed-on. Some pastries use a "mirror glaze", which is glossy enough to create reflections, and some candies and confections are coated in edible wax glazes, often during tumbling.

A savory glaze such as demi-glace can be made from reduced stock or meat glaze that is poured onto meat or vegetables. A glazed ham may have its glaze applied before baking, basted with it during, or produced after, as with a brown sugar mix being heated by a torch.

== History ==
The origin of glaze recipes can be traced to the medieval British period. A typical medieval English glaze was the 'Elizabethan' glaze made from lightly beaten egg whites and sugar used predominantly on pastries of the time.

== See also ==
- General terms:
  - Glazing agent
  - Icing
  - Pastry brush
- In baking and confectionery:
  - Couverture chocolate
  - Enrobing
  - Marron glacé
- In cooking:
  - Demi-glace
  - Meat glaze
