= Breadcrumbs =

Residue of dried bread

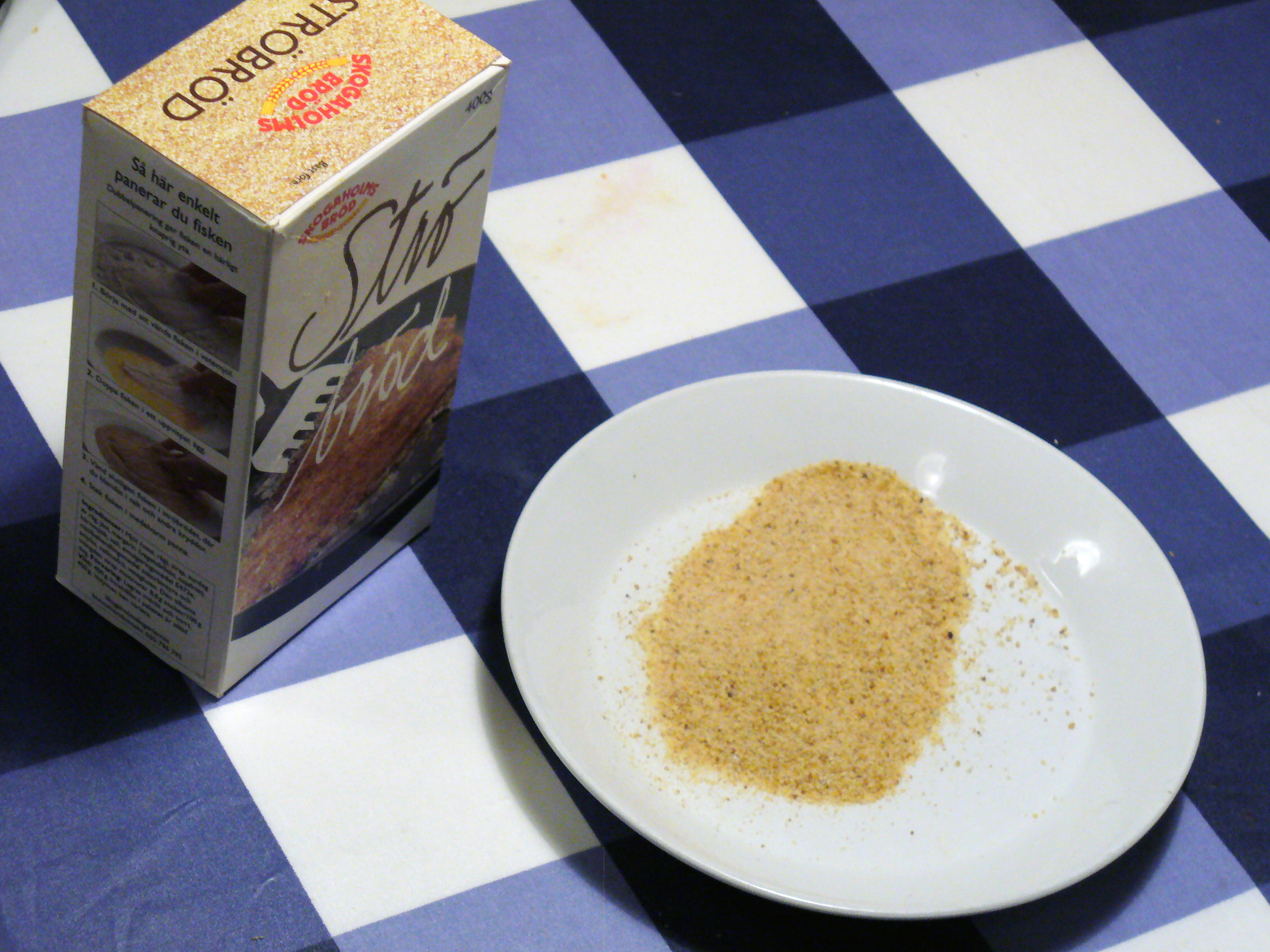
- Commercially produced breadcrumbs
- Main ingredients: Dried bread
- Variations: Panko

Breadcrumbs are a culinary ingredient consisting of flour or crumbled bread of varying dryness, sometimes with seasonings added. They are used for a variety of purposes, including breading or crumbing foods before frying (such as breaded cutlets like tonkatsu and schnitzel), topping casseroles, stuffing poultry, thickening stews, and adding inexpensive bulk to soups, meatloaves, and similar foods.

== Types ==
=== Dry ===
Dry breadcrumbs are made from dry breads that have been baked or toasted to remove most remaining moisture, and may have a sandy or even powdery texture. Breadcrumbs are most easily produced by pulverizing slices of bread in a food processor, using a steel blade to make coarse crumbs, or a grating blade to make fine crumbs. A grater or similar tool will also do.

=== Fresh ===
The breads used to make soft or fresh breadcrumbs are not quite as dry, so the crumbs are larger and produce a softer coating, crust, or stuffing.

=== Panko ===
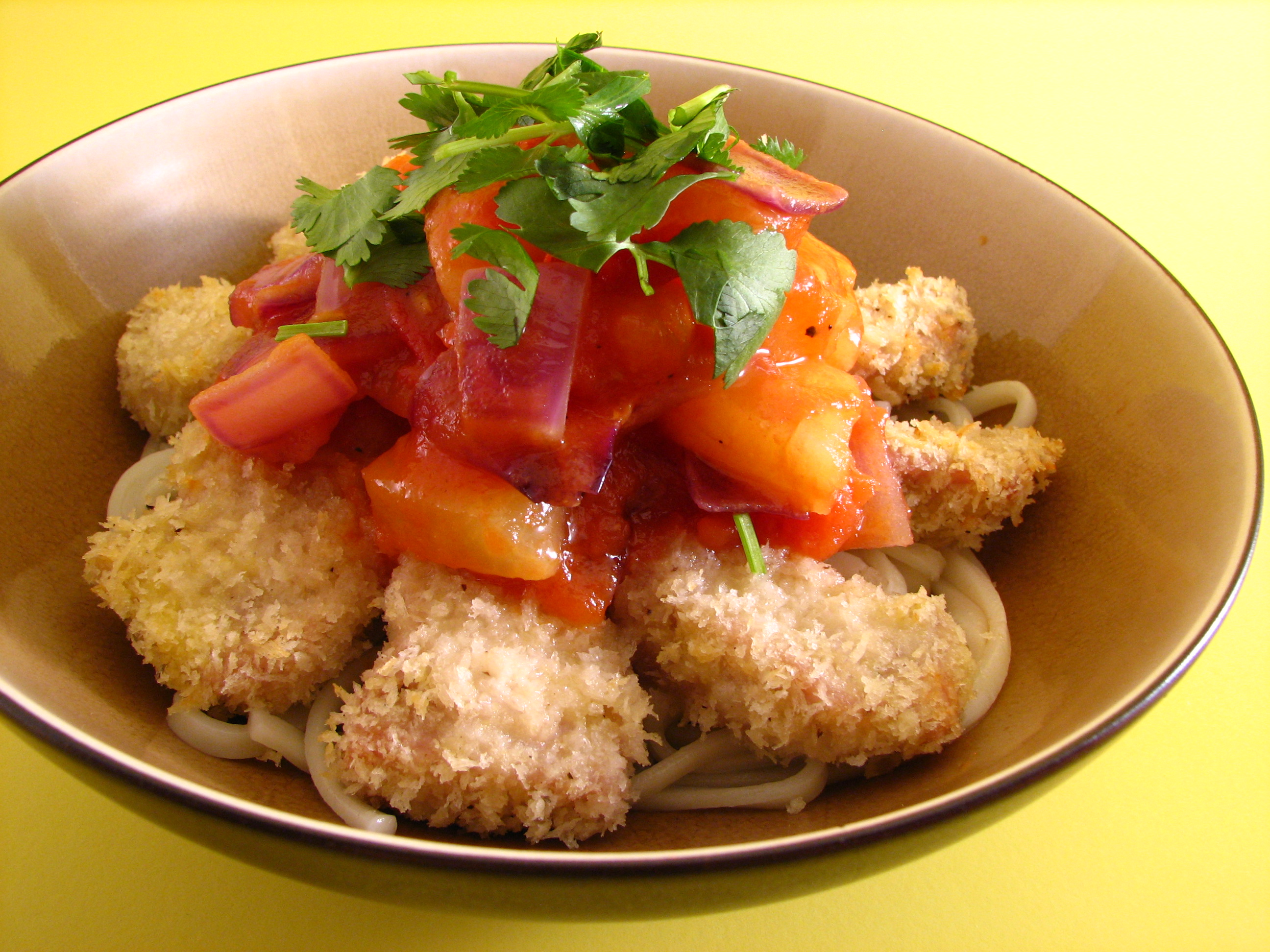
Baked panko-crusted pork with pineapple sauce over udon

Panko (パン粉) is a type of flaky breadcrumbs used in Japanese cuisine as a crunchy coating for fried foods, such as tonkatsu. Panko is made from bread baked by passing an electrical current through the dough, which yields a bread without a crust, and then grinding the bread to create fine slivers of crumb. It has a crisper, airier texture than most types of breading found in Western cuisine and maintains its texture baked or deep-fried, resulting in a lighter coating. Outside Japan, its use has become more common in both Asian and non-Asian dishes. It is often used on seafood and is typically available in Asian markets, specialty stores, and many large supermarkets.

Panko is produced worldwide, particularly in Asian countries, including Japan, Korea, Malaysia, Thailand, China, and Vietnam.

==== Etymology ====
The Japanese first learned to make baked bread from the Portuguese. The word パン粉 (panko) is derived from pan, giving the word for bread in Japanese (derived from the Portuguese word "pão" for bread), and -粉 (-ko), a Japanese kanji indicating "flour", "coating", "crumb", or "powder" on occasion, when used as a suffix (as in komeko, "rice powder", sobako, "buckwheat flour", and komugiko, "wheat flour").

=== Pangrattato ===
Pangrattato is an Italian garnish of toasted, seasoned breadcrumbs, often added to pasta or cooked vegetables. It may be flavored with ingredients such as garlic, anchovies, chili peppers or herbs.

== Breading ==
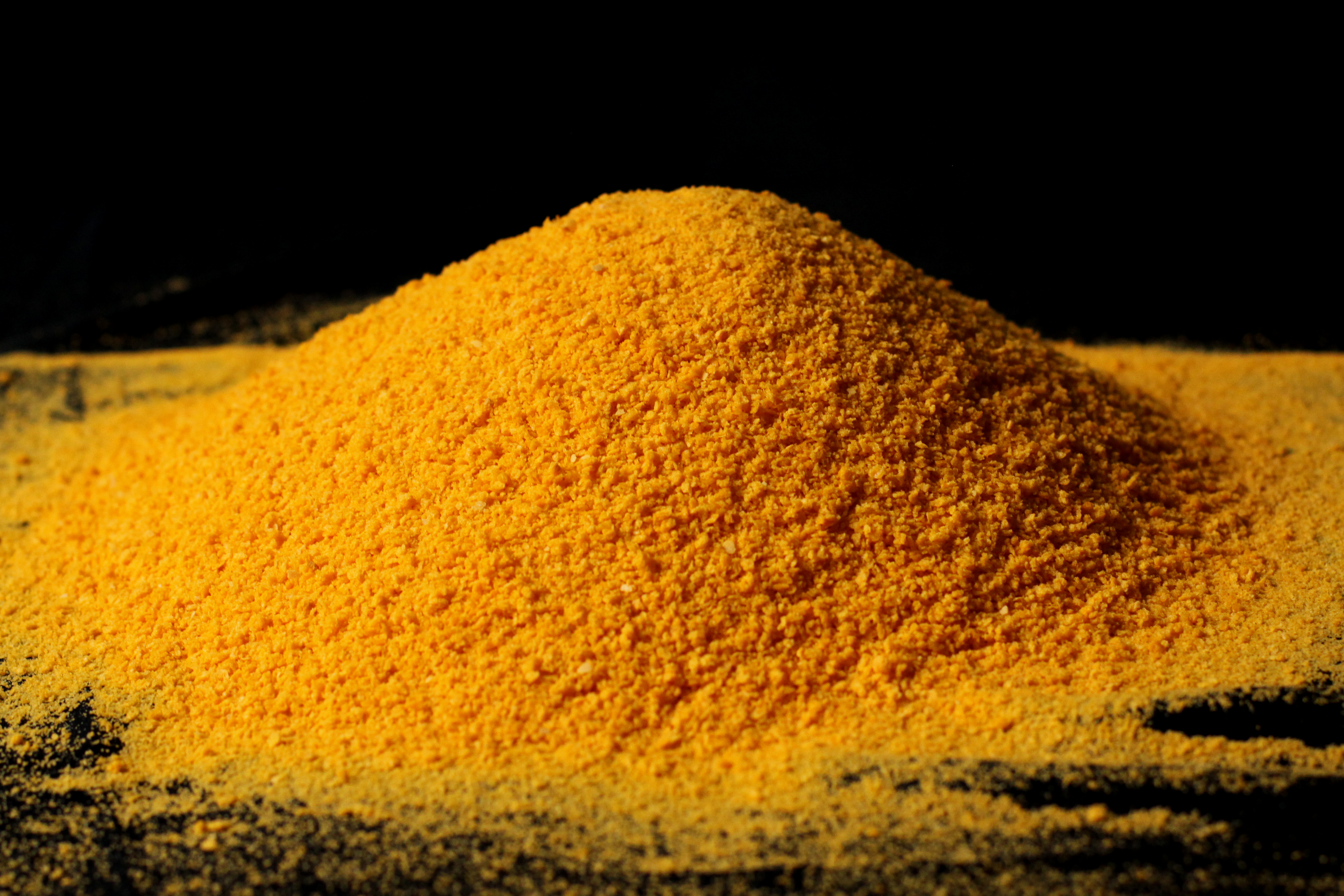
Seasoned breading mixture

Breading, also known as crumbing, is a dry grain-derived food coating for a piece of food made from breadcrumbs or a breading mixture with seasonings. Breading is well-suited for frying as it lends itself to creating a crisp coating around the food. Breading mixtures can be made of breadcrumbs, flour, cornmeal, and seasoning that the item to be breaded is dredged in before cooking. If the item to be breaded is too dry for the coating to stick, the item may first be moistened with buttermilk, raw egg, egg wash, or other liquid.

Breading contrasts with batter, which is a grain-based liquid coating for food that produces a smoother and finer texture, but which can be softer overall.

== Hansel and Gretel ==
In the fairy tale "Hansel and Gretel", breadcrumbs are used by Hansel and Gretel to track their footpath. However, the breadcrumbs were eventually eaten by birds, subsequently leading them to become lost in the woods. The popularity of breadcrumbs in the fairy tale led to the use of the word breadcrumb as a navigation element that allows users to keep track of their locations within programs or documents.

== Gallery ==
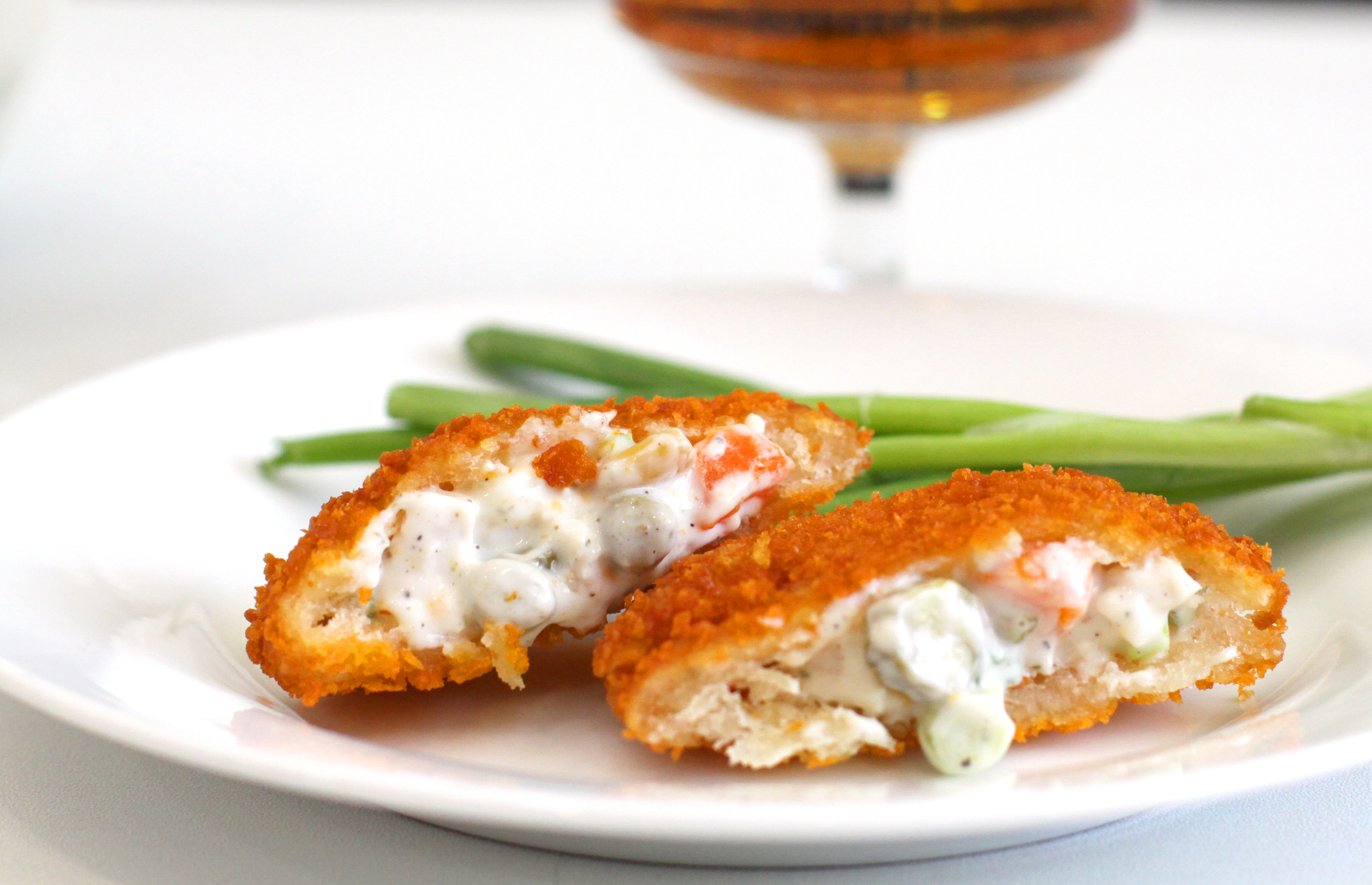
Corn and chicken coated in breadcrumbs and fried.

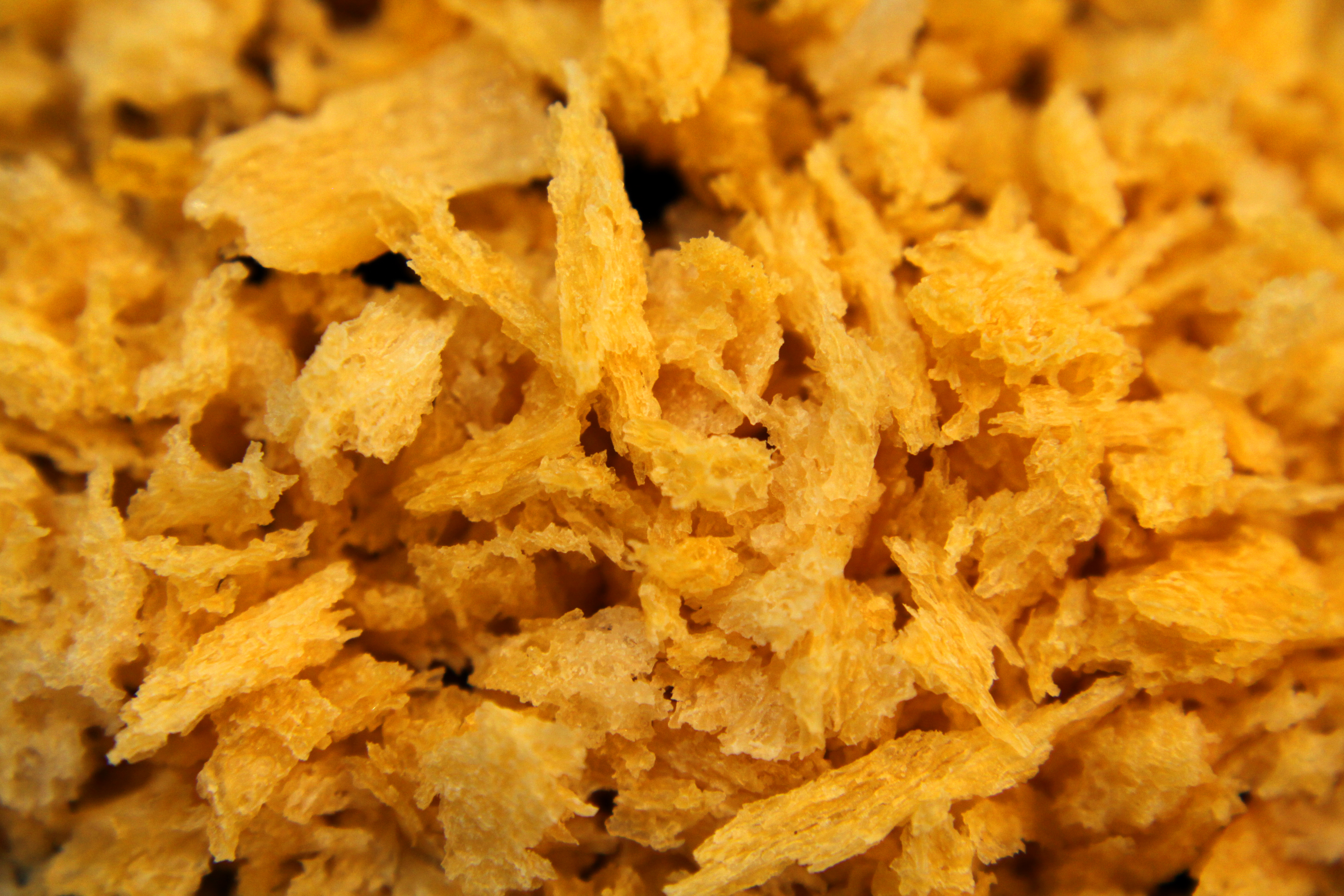
Panko breadcrumbs with paprika flavour

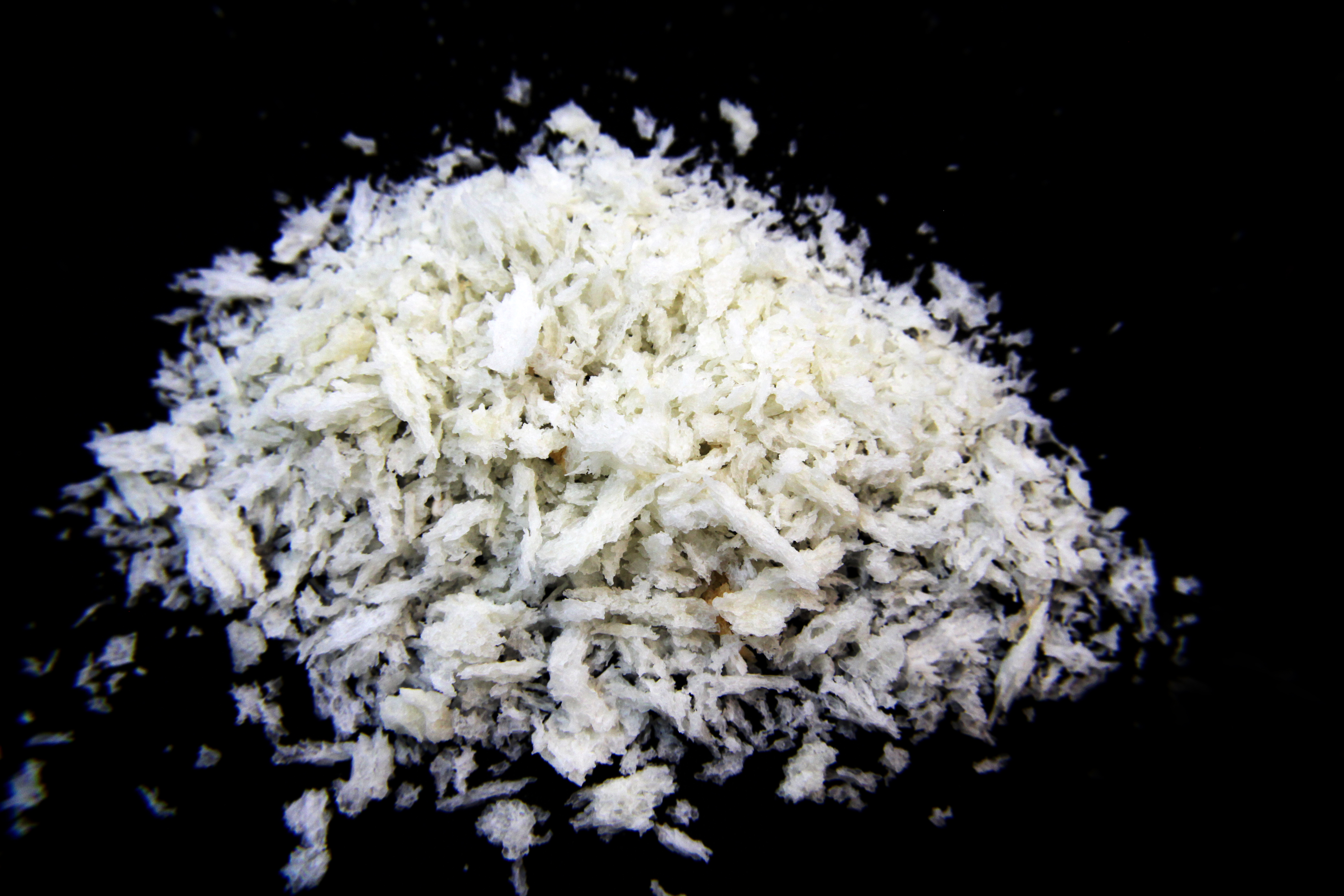
Panko white breadcrumbs

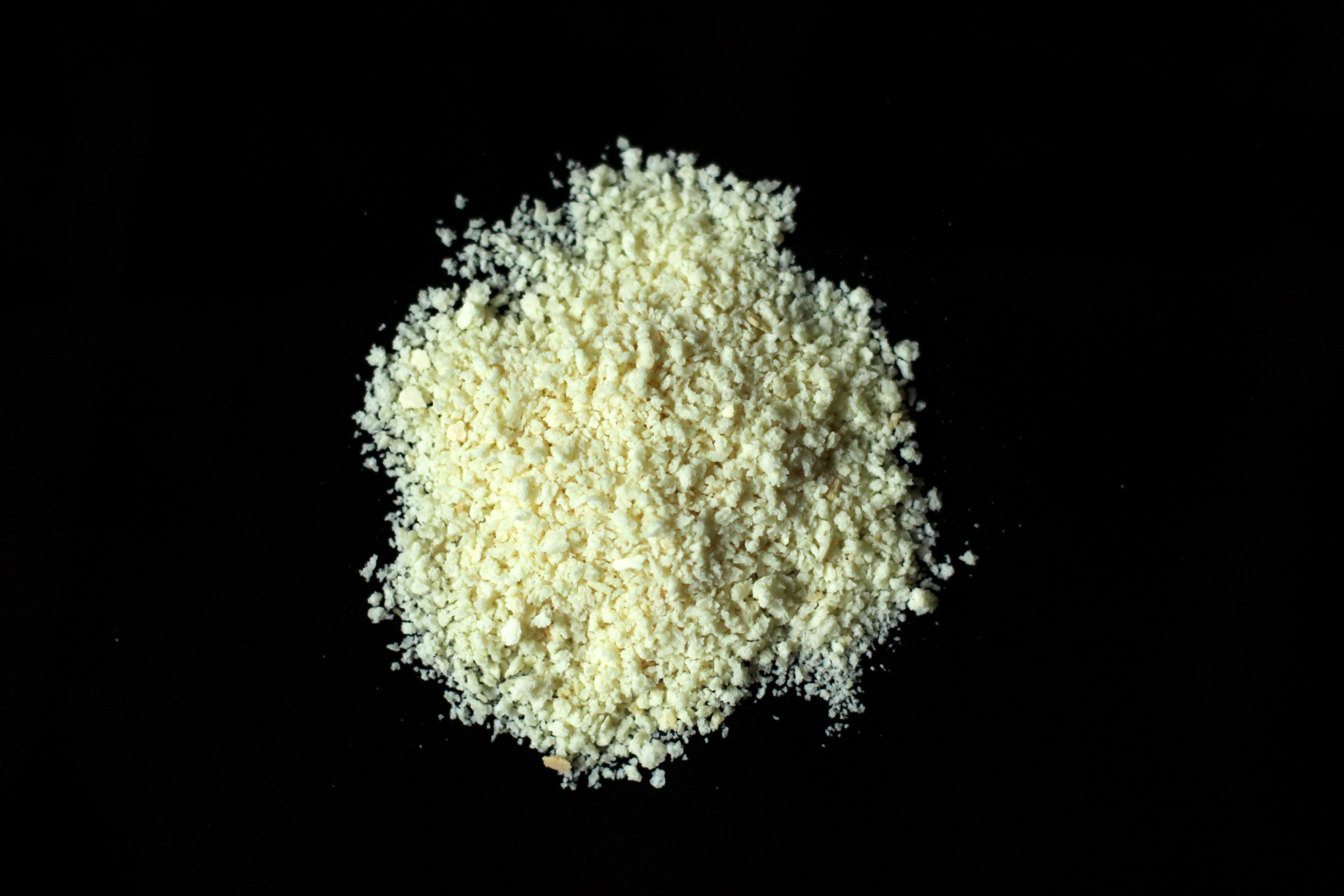
IANS simple breadcrumbs

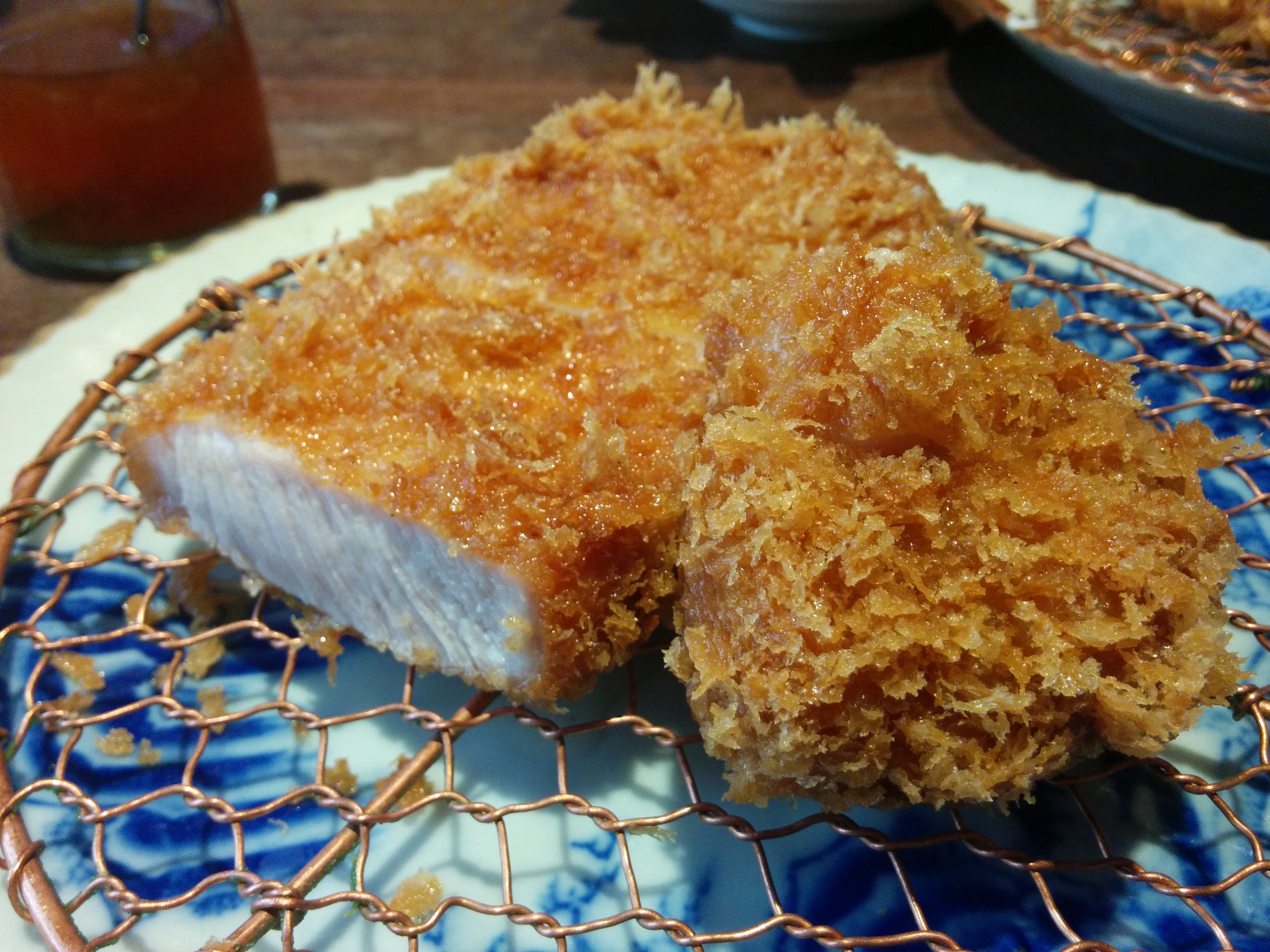
Panko on Tonkatsu

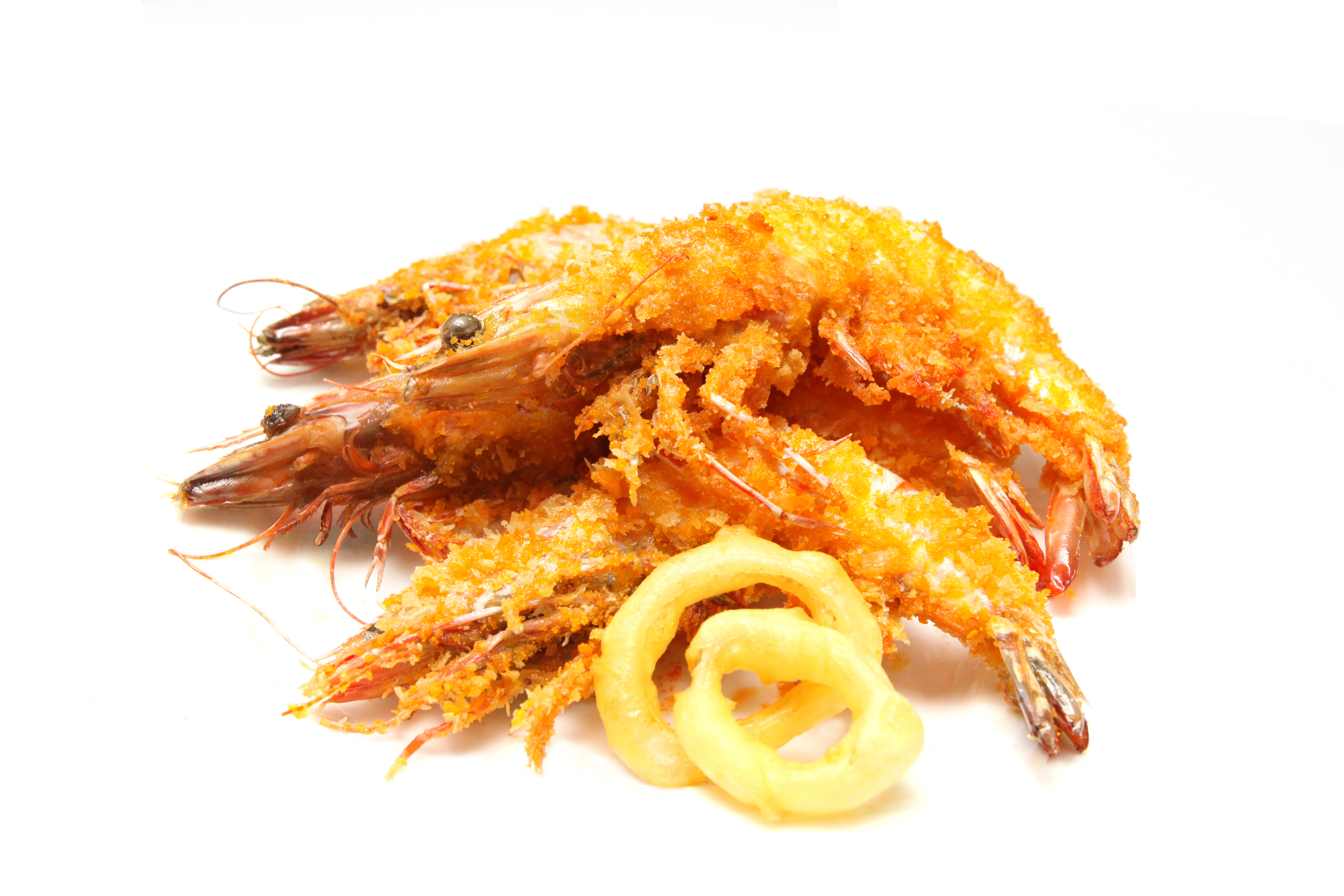
Fried shrimp with panko breadcrumbs

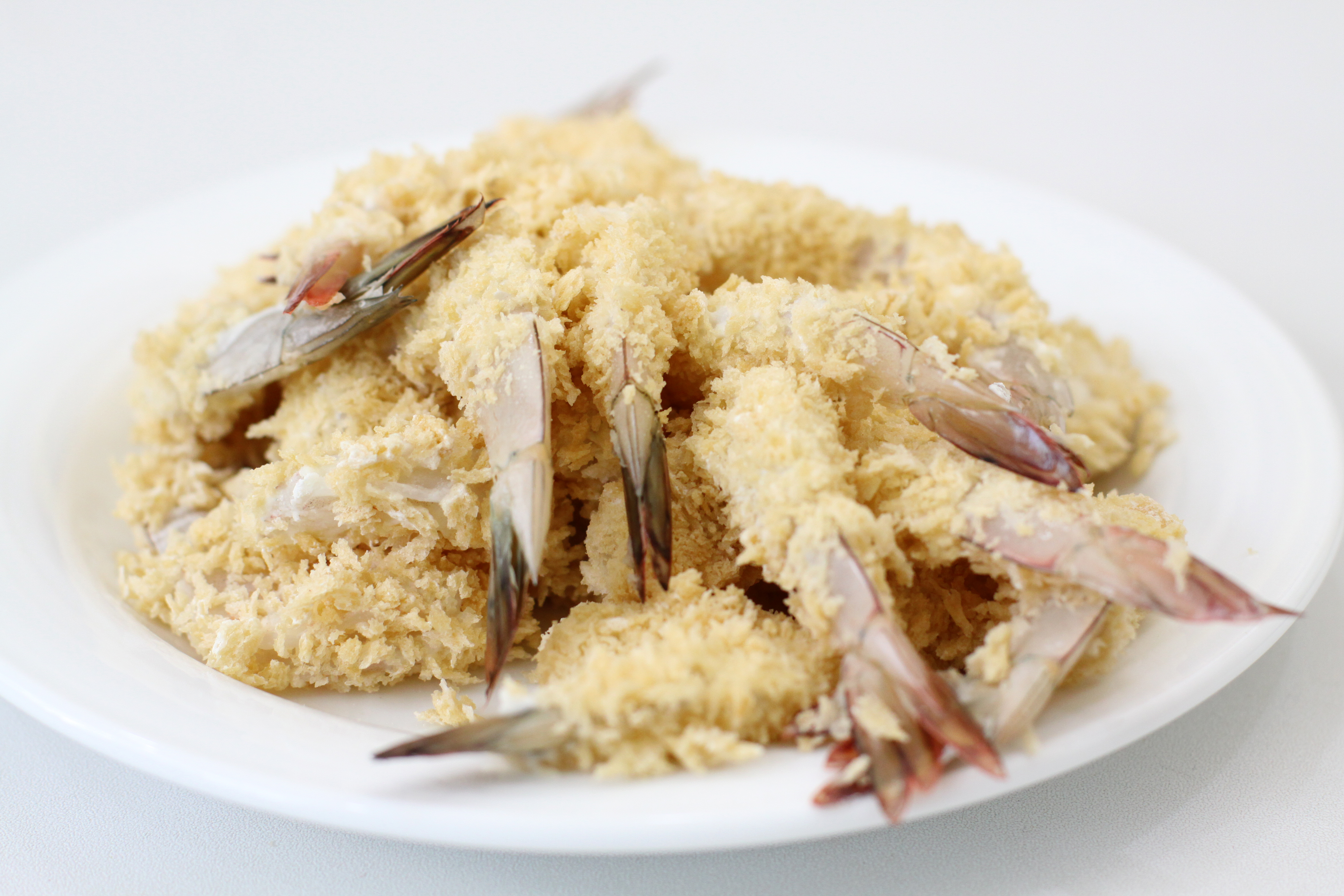
Shrimp coated by panko breadcrumbs

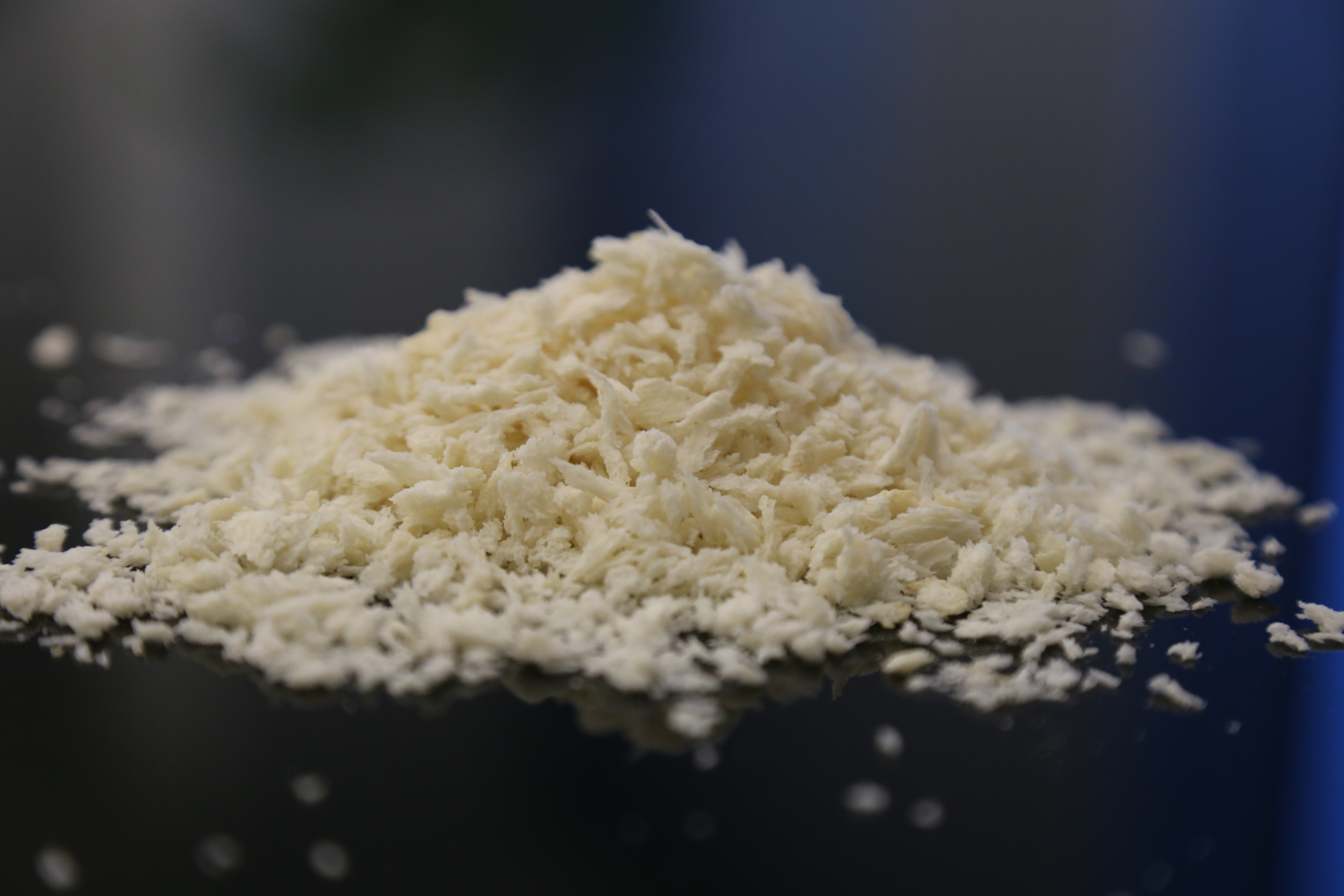
Panko breadcrumbs – white

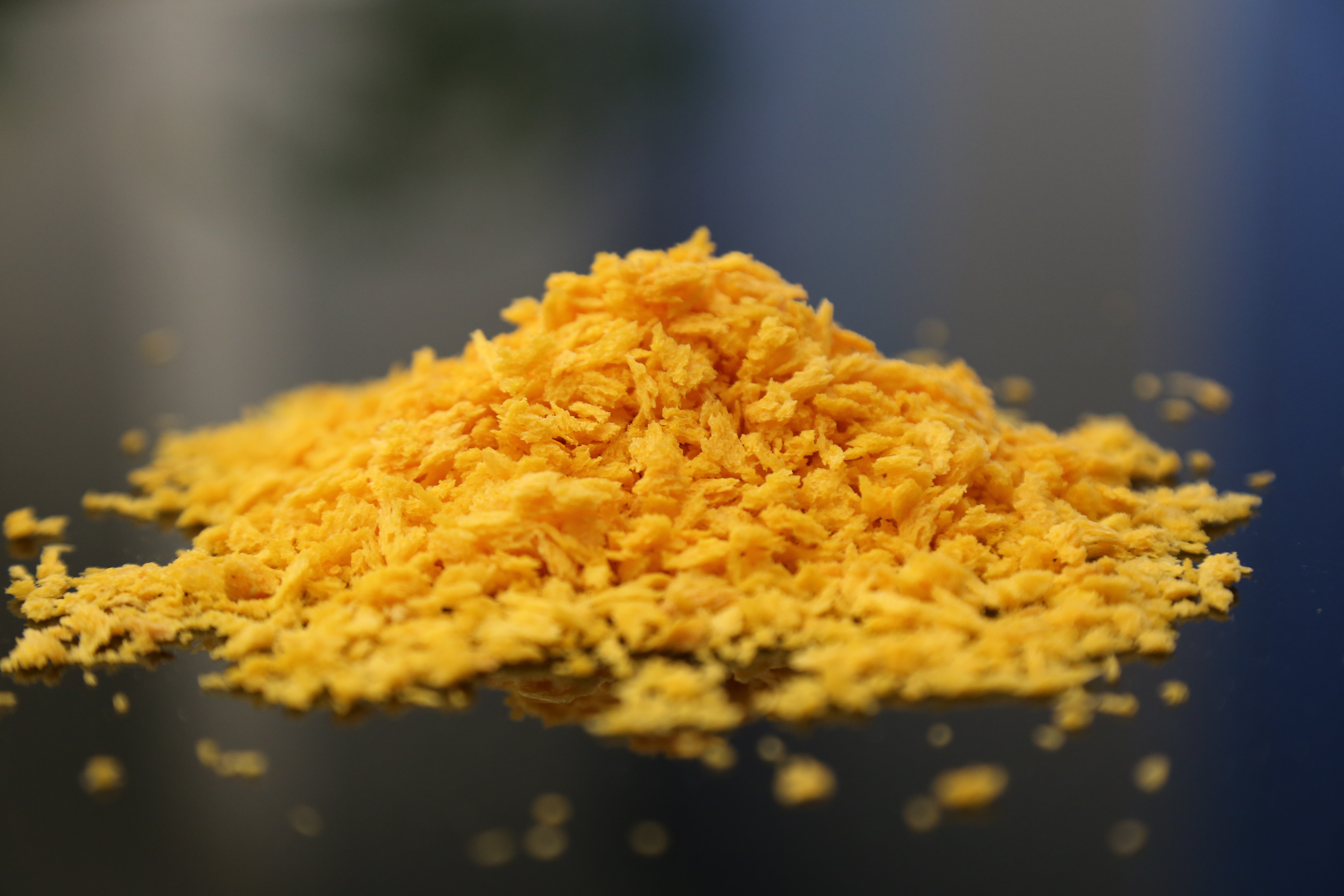
Panko breadcrumbs – paprika

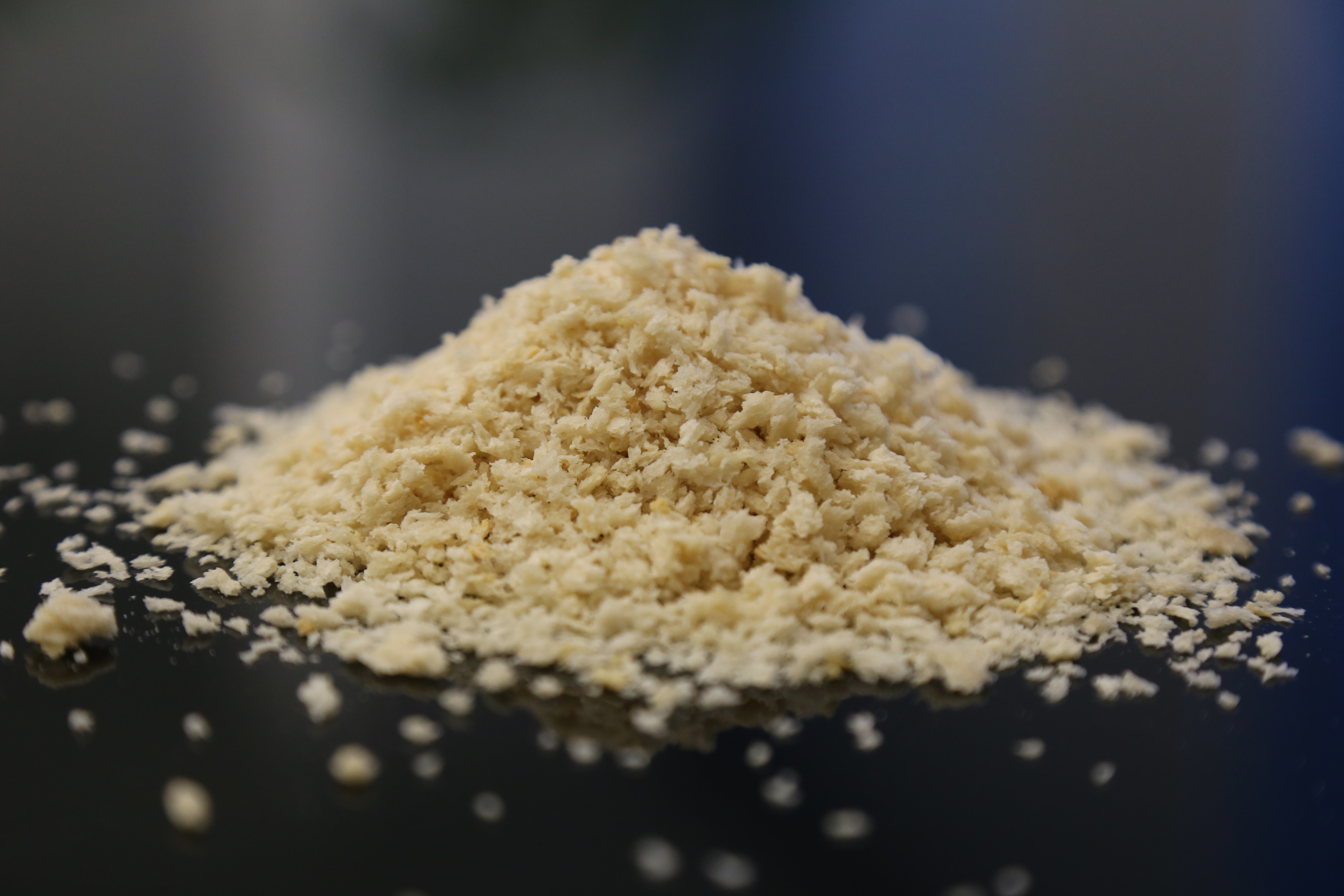
Panko breadcrumbs – spicy
