= OctoFrost Group =

Swedish food freezer company

OctoFrost Group is a Swedish company that manufacturers IQF (individual quick freezing) freezers for the food industry . The company has over 50 employees located both at the headquarters in Malmö, Sweden, and in several other countries. The company was established in 1999, by Ruben Larsson, with headquarters in Malmö.

The OctoFrost Group consists of three main business groups. OctoFrost AB is responsible for sales, marketing, administration and finance; OctoFrost Technology AB is responsible for engineering, building, service and maintaining of the freezers; OctoFrost Inc. is the US-based subsidiary dealing with sales and marketing in North America.

In 2015, the company's and freezers' name was changed from IQF Frost to OctoFrost, while the service company changed its name from ProFrost to Octofrost Technology.
