= Fruit waxing =

Process of covering a fruit with wax

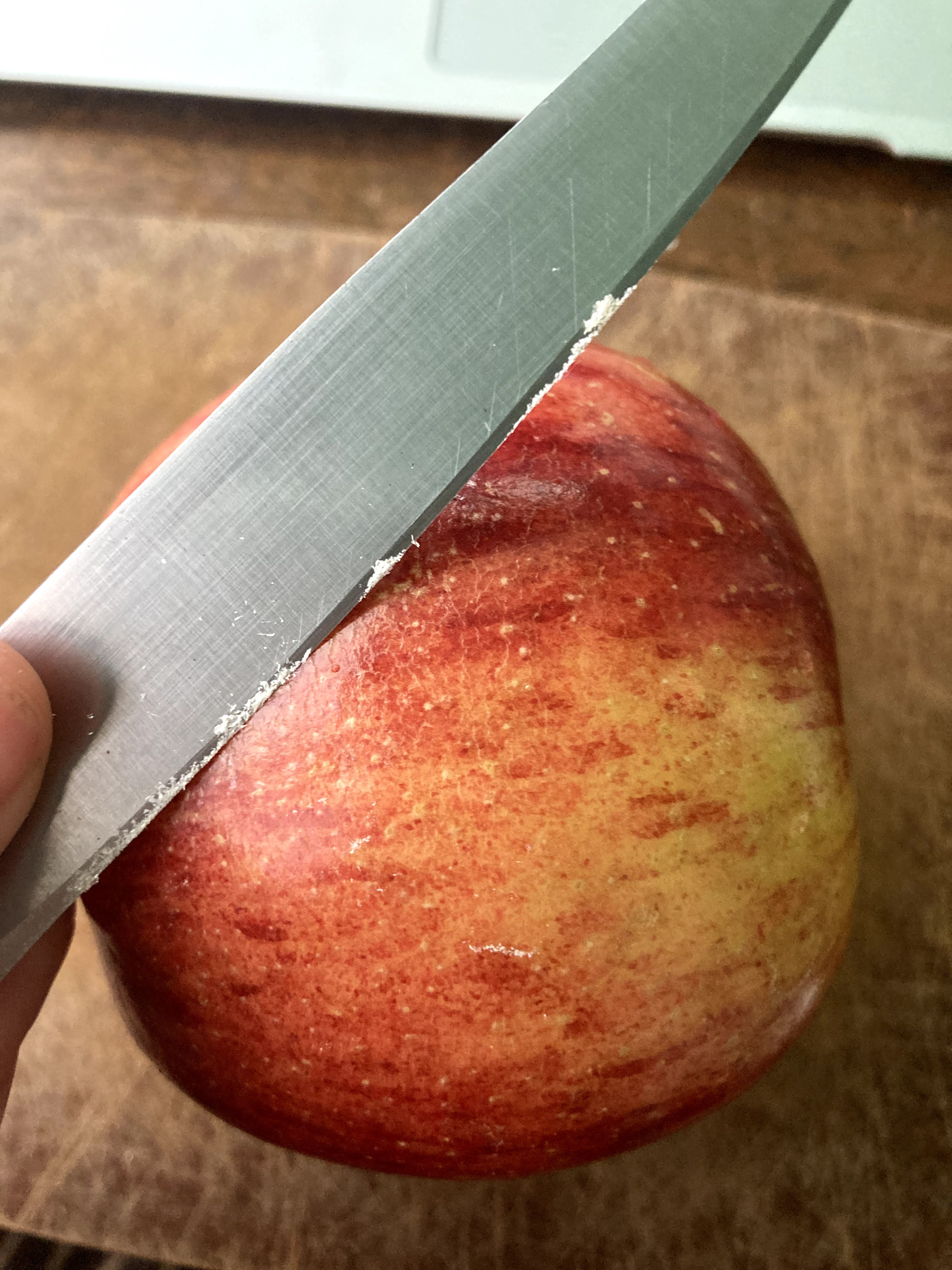
Shaving the synthetic wax from an apple

Fruit waxing is the process of covering fruits (and, in some cases, vegetables) with artificial waxing material. Natural wax is removed first, usually by washing, followed by a coating of a biological or petroleum derived wax. Potentially allergenic proteins (peanut, soy, dairy, wheat) may be combined with shellac.

The primary reasons for waxing are to prevent water loss (after the removal in washing of the natural waxes in fruits that have them, particularly citrus but also apples). And thus slow shrinkage and spoilage, and to improve appearance. Dyes may be added to further enhance appearance, and sometimes fungicides. Fruits were waxed to cause fermentation as early as the 12th or the 13th century; commercial producers began waxing citrus to extend shelf life in the 1920s and 1930s. Aesthetics (consumer preference for shiny fruit) has since become the main reason. In addition to fruit, some vegetables can usefully be waxed, such as cassava. A distinction may be made between storage wax, pack-out wax (for immediate sale), and high-shine wax (for optimum attractiveness).

== Products that are often waxed ==
A number of sources list the following as products which may be waxed before shipping to stores:

- apples
- avocados
- bell and hot peppers
- cucumbers
- eggplant
- grapefruit
- lemons
- limes
- mangoes
- melons
- nectarines
- oranges
- papayas
- parsnips
- passion fruit
- peaches
- pears
- pineapple
- plums
- pumpkins
- rutabaga
- squash
- sweet potatoes
- tangerines
- tomatoes
- turnips
- yucca

== Materials ==
The materials used to wax produce depend to some extent on regulations in the country of production and/or export. Both natural waxes (carnauba, shellac, beeswax or resin) and petroleum-based waxes (usually proprietary formulae) are used, and often more than one wax is combined to create the desired properties for the fruit or vegetable being treated. Wax may be applied in a volatile petroleum-based solvent but is now more commonly applied via a water-based emulsion. Blended paraffin waxes applied as an oil or paste are often used on vegetables.

== See also ==
- Food coating
- Glazing agent
