= Food coating =

Food manufacturing process

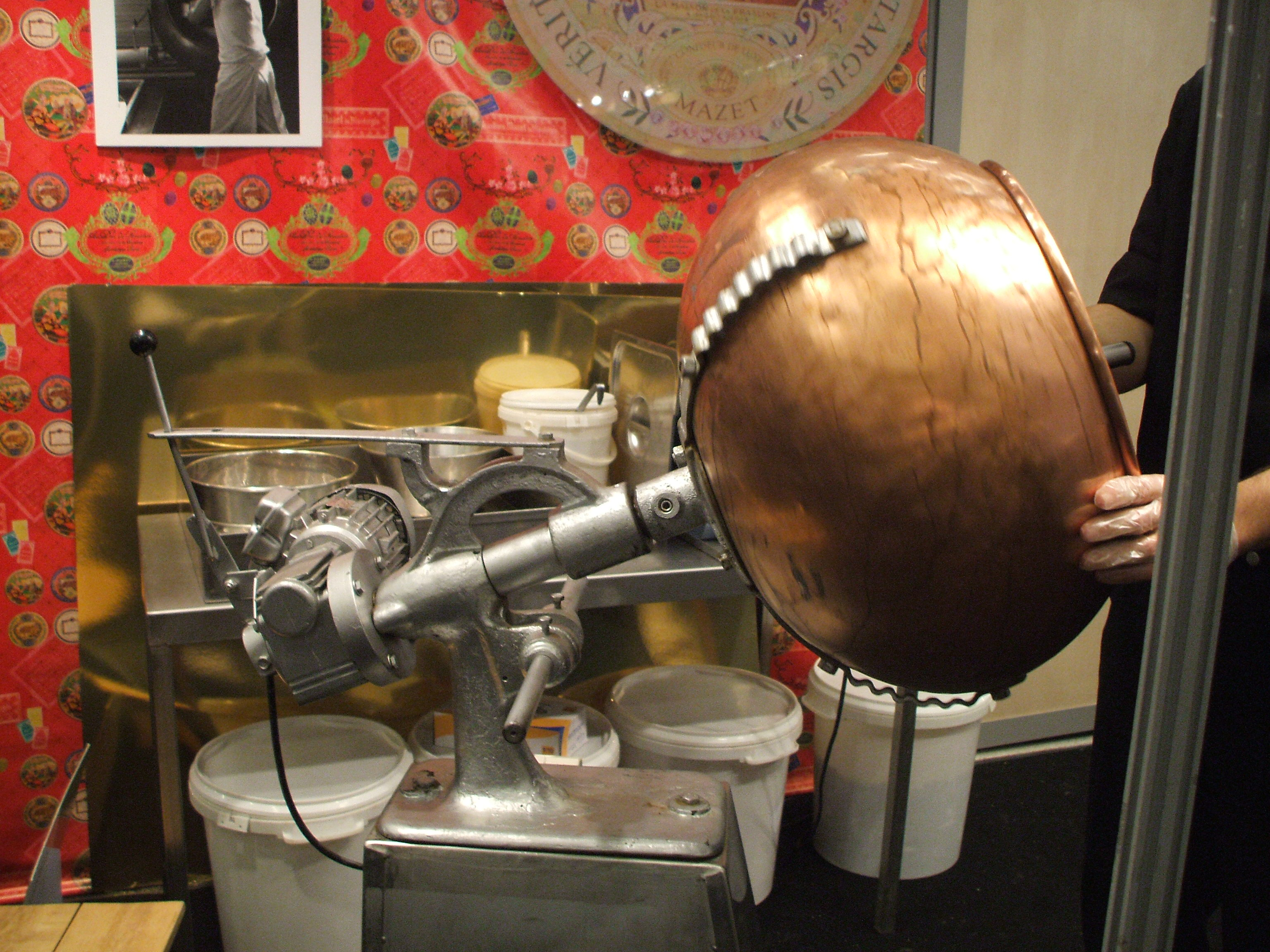
A machine using a rotation process to sugar-coat dragée

Coating is a process that consists of applying a liquid or a powder into the surface of an edible product to convey new (usually sensory) properties. Coating designates an operation as much as the result of it: the application of a layer and the layer itself. Coating takes different meanings depending on the industry concerned.

== Definitions ==
This article concerns coating applications in the food industry. There are many similarities between coating processes and numerous examples of technology transfer to and from the food industry.

Coating in the food industry is the application of a layer of liquids or solids onto a product. The operation essentially relies on mechanical energy. It consists mostly in setting the product particles in motion and simultaneously applying the coating ingredient in a certain pattern to expose one to the other. It involves such phenomena as adhesion, friction, viscosity, surface tension and crystallisation. Food coating is not a “hard” science such as drying or cooling, which can be described by equations and are predictable. Food coating is rather a “soft” knowledge derived from the accumulation of know-how. One reason is that the product and the ingredients considered have complex characteristics, variations and interactions.

Encapsulation is the application of a liquid layer to very small particles. It relies on an array of principles: entrapping a molecule inside a matrix, chemical bonding, and polymerisation. Encapsulation aims at the protection and controlled release of active molecules when immersed in an environment. As a rule of thumb, particle size can discriminate between “encapsulation” (below 300 μm to 1000 μm) and “food coating” (above this limit). Mere mechanical movement is not adequate and sufficient to fulfill the proper coating of minute particles.

Examples of coated products
Finished product	Base	Ingredient	Post treatment	Rate, %	Objective
Ready-to-eat cereals	Expanded cereals	Sugar syrup	Drying	20-50%	Flavour and appearance enhancement
Dragees	Nuts, chocolate, sweets	Sugar	Panning	10-100%	Taste, flavour
Chocolate	Hazelnuts, almonds	Chocolate	Cooling	30-50%	Taste, flavour
Prepared vegetable	Frozen vegetables	Water, fats, flavourings	Freezing	15-100%	Taste, convenience
Processed cheese	Grated/shredded cheese	Anticaking	None	<2%	Prevent agglomeration
Nuggets	Meat	Batter and crumb	Frying	30-50%	Palatability, cost, appearance
Snacks	Expanded flour	Oil and seasoning	None	5-40%	Palatability
Crunchy nuts	Peanut	Flour, binder, seasoning	Frying, baking	30-100%	Palatability

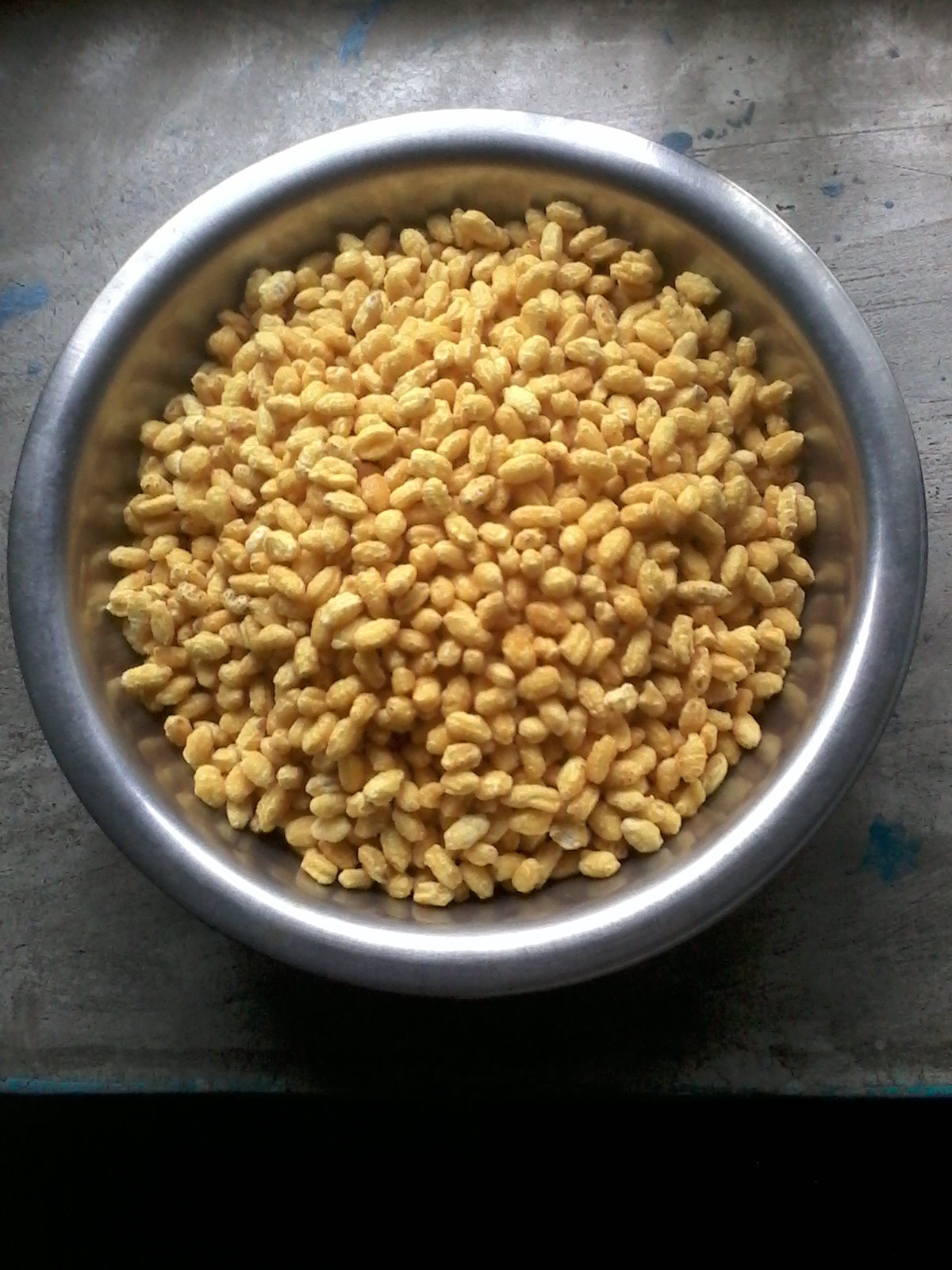
Sugar-coated rice

IQF vegetables coated with cream

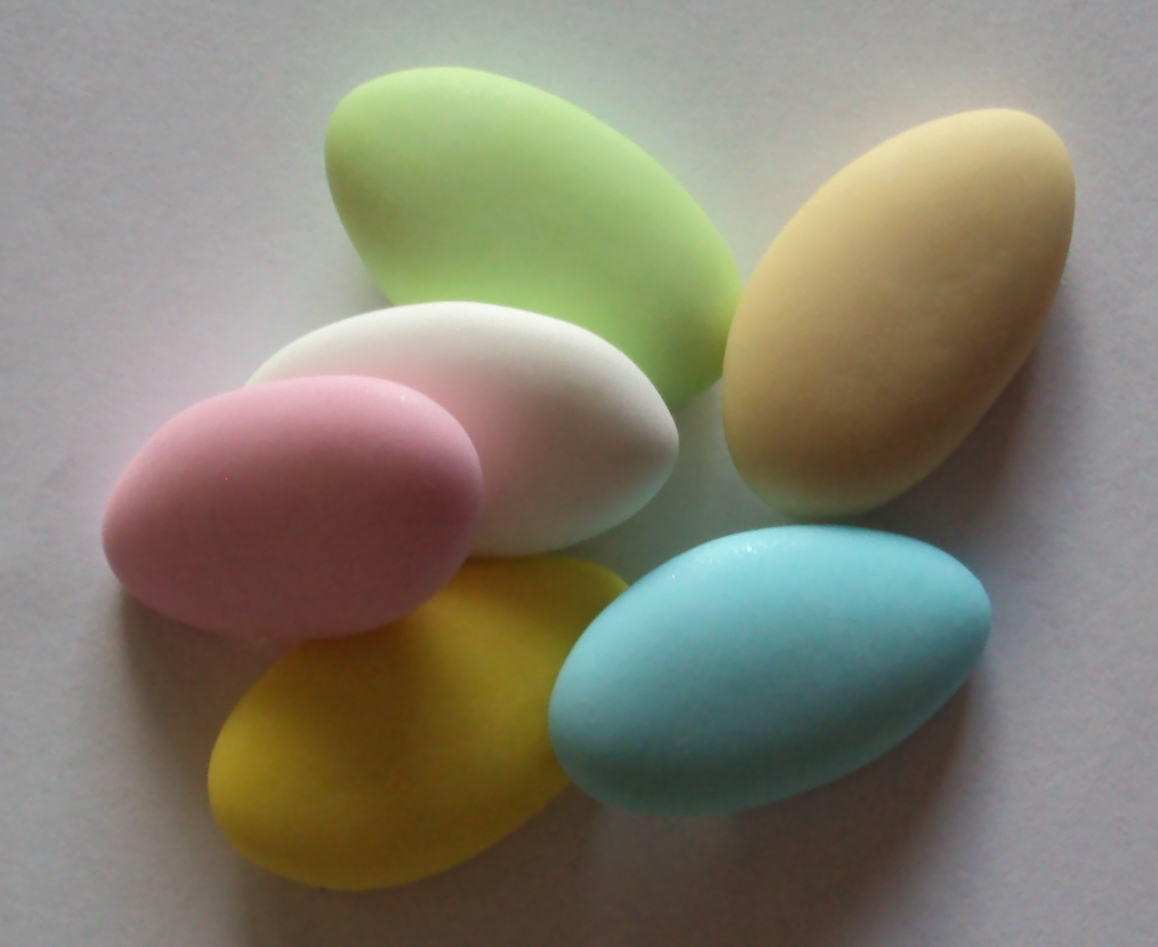
Sugar-coated dragees

=== Objectives of coating ===
Coatings can be added for the enhancement of organoleptic properties of a food product. Appearance and palatability can be improved by adding color (white dragee, brown chocolate), changing the surface aspect (glazed sweets or rough, crispy nuggets); changing or adding tastes (sweet dragee, salted snack) or flavours (fruit-glazed sweet goods), or texture (breaded crispy nuggets).

Coatings also can be used to add vitamins and minerals (enriched white rice) or food energy.

Coating conveys functional properties, such as particle separation (oiled dry fruit, shredded cheese), antioxidant effect (fruit cubes), or a barrier effect [water migration between a layer of ice cream and a biscuit (cookie) or against moisture loss of chewing gum]. Barrier effects are often difficult to achieve.

An ingredient may be cheaper than the product it coats and thus allows for a slight cost reduction.

=== The coating process ===
The coating process begins with the application of the coating on the food product, but the end product must be stable throughout its shelf life. Therefore, a coating process is completed by a stabilizing process, either by freezing, cooling, heating or drying. The sequences of this process are:

1. Application: To apply minute quantities of an ingredient, spraying is used to disperse it first, instead of just pouring it. This hastens the dispersion on the whole surface of the product. For larger ratios of coating to substrate, mixing or dipping can be used. Multiple stages also can be used; breaded meats, for example, may have a dry application (predust) followed by a wet batter dip and then another dry crumb application.
2. Adhesion: the coating must adhere to the product, meaning there must be a degree of affinity between the ingredient and the product.
3. Coalescence: in case of a liquid, the multiple droplets may merge to form a uniform continuous layer. Characteristics of the ingredient in relation to the product, such as viscosity and surface tension associated to a mechanical effect (friction) are critical.
4. Stabilisation : depending on the nature of the coating ingredient(s) and substrate product, the ingredient is stabilised by elimination of the solvent (drying and evaporation of water, alcohol), crystallisation (sugar crystallises when water is evaporated, fat crystallises when cooled), or thermal treatment (proteins set irreversibly when heated).

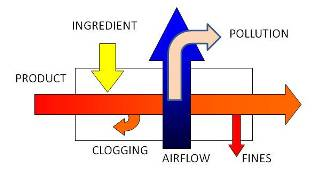
The coating process seen as a system

A coating process can be broken into the following elements:

- Inputs: base product, additives and ingredients
- Additional flows: air as a carrier of product or ingredient, or for drying, energy in a mechanical (agitation, transfer, friction) or a thermal form (convection, conduction or radiation heating)
- Outputs: end product, excess of coating ingredient, lost or to be recycled

Collaterals occur along the process:

- Breakage of product
- Generation of fines (small particles)
- Agglomeration of products
- Clogging of system surfaces with product or ingredient
- Airborne pollution, volatile organic component

These effects generally are to be avoided unless the end product is made more desirable.

Parameters affecting the system are listed by origin:

Initial characteristics.
Base product	End product	Production
Shape, size, distribution, bulk density, nature, surface aspect, resistance, composition, flow behaviour, fines, hygroscopicity, temperature	Capacity, end aspect, weight gain, storage behaviour, resistance	Recipe changes, duration, cleaning

This first set of criteria governs the choice of the coating ingredient. The coating consists either in a single ingredient or a mix. This mix has different physical forms: solution, emulsion, suspension, powder, etc. It has its own characteristics. In addition, a fluid may be required such as spraying, cooling, heating or drying air.

Ingredient characteristics.
Additive	Fluid.
Water or fat base, composition, concentration, viscosity, temperature, melting point, surface tension, setting behaviour	Nature, temperature, relative humidity

The combination of the above characteristics drives the choice of the process principle. It has then to be precisely described.

Process characteristics.
Process	Machine
Continuous, batch, residence time, ingredient temperature, fluid temperature, system temperature, flow volumes, tolerance to variations, number of functions to fulfill (feeding, dosing, recycling, drying)	Form, internal surface, internal volume, size, mechanical movement, speed, temperature

The selection of the proper process and its control rely on the gathering of precise and reliable information.

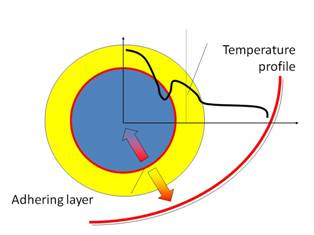
Influence of temperature on adhesion.

The influence of some phenomena and their parameters is critical: crystallisation, water removal (drying), glass transition, viscosity, or surface tension.

Among the parameters, temperature has a choice place. It influences viscosity, surface tension, drying or crystallisation behaviour. Ultimately, it influences the coating rate (thickness, weight gain) and coating resistance. It therefore influences the degree of clogging of product and ingredient in the system. For example, fat will tend to set preferably on a cool product if the system wall is kept at a higher temperature.

== Practice ==
=== Coating ingredients ===
Ingredients
Ingredient	Form	Usual coating rate	Characteristics related to coating	Coating aim	Examples
Water	Pure liquid	1-3%		Wetting, adhesion, weight gain	Dust prevention, freezer burn prevention
Water	Saturated steam.	1-3%		Wetting, adhesion	Gluing of sugar on candies
Alcohol	Solution 70%	0,1%	Alcohol rate	Antimicrobial, preservative, texture enhancement	Preservation of packed pastries
Resin (shellac)	Alcoholic solution 30%	1%	Film forming	Surface aspect, flow, moisture barrier	Glazing of chocolate dragees
Wax (beeswax, carnauba, candelilla)	Solid form, melted, micronized suspension in oil	1%	Melting point	Surface aspect, barrier	Glazing of sugar dragees, fruit waxing
Sugars (saccharose, glucose, honey, polyols)	Solution 70-90%	1-100%	Crystallisation form, concentration, temperature	Palatability, surface aspect (glazed or frosty)	Sugar-coated ready-to-eat cereals
Natural hydrocolloid (gum arabic, xanthan, guar gelatine	Solution 20-40%	3%	Film forming, barrier	Mechanical or chemical protection, carrier of additives	Precoating of dragee with gum arabic and sugar prior to dragee pan coating
Starches (native or modified)	Colloidal solution 20-40%	3%	Characteristics depend on physical and chemical modifications, substitutes for more expensive ingredients (gum arabic, gelatine, titanium dioxide, etc.)	Mechanical or physical protection	Coating of fries before frying to reduce oil pick up
Flours	Powder or thick suspensions 20-40%	10-20%	Film forming, charge, viscosity, baking expansion	Thickness, crispiness	Coating of nuggets with batter prior to breading
Mineral or organic powders (talc, cellulose, potato flour, cellulose, starch)	Pure powder	1%	Moisture or fat absorption	Anticaking, drying	Coating of shredded cheese to prevent agglomeration
Oils and fats	Pure	1 - 40%	Melting point, viscosity	Anticaking, adhesion, barrier against moisture migration	Oiling of dry raisins or inclusions in ice cream
Seasonings, flavours, flavour enhancers, salt	Powder, diluted or concentrated solutions	1-3%	Concentration	Palatability	Flavouring of expanded snacks, salting of roasted nuts

=== Coating techniques ===
For the sake of classification, two categories can be split easily into batch or continuous processes. Then, the categories can be refined according to the way the product is set in motion and the ingredient applied. Then, techniques allow either for just coating or can combine coating and setting in the same equipment.

Techniques
Name	Principle	Example	Alternative	Batch/Continuous
Coextrusion	Forming of an outside casing around an inner content	Forming machine for sausages with forming of a collagen casing, further setting by coagulation and drying	High-temperature, short-time cooking-extrusion of snacks with continuous filling of a flavoured paste	Continuous
Paddle mixer	Mixing by agitation in a closed volume	Snack coating	Helicoidal, scraping paddles	Batch
Vat mixer	IQF coating (and freezing) tumbler	Vacuum mixing		Batch
Conveyor	Application of the ingredient on the product spread across a conveyor (enrober)	Topical coating of pastries	Spraying, screen, dipping coating	Continuous
Drum	Application of the ingredient while the product is tumbled in drum (panning)	Snack seasoning; simultaneous coating and drying of cereals with sugar		Continuous
Screw	Application of the ingredient while the product is transferred and mixed in a trough fitted with screw(s))	Petfood	Twin-screw systems for a better mixing	Continuous

Criteria for the selection of a technique

- Base product characteristics: shape, size, bulk density. Size is the first criterion.
- Mechanical resistance of the base product
- Final thickness of the coating layer
- Complete/partial, top/side/bottom coating
- Number of sequences to repeat
- Processing time for each sequence
- Setting mode: drying, cooling, freezing
- Capacity
- Preferred batch or continuous system

Comparison batch vs. Continuous The demand for higher yields makes production managers want to shift from manual batch to continuous automated systems. One has to consider the pros and contras prior to go for a costly and risky decision.

Comparison
	Batch	Continuous
Advantages	Flexible, easy to monitor and control, quick response, less time-dependent, easy recipe change, full traceability, tool for R&D.	Efficient, justified if upstream and downstream processes are continuous.
Drawbacks	Limited capacity, Manpower	Expansive; requires careful controls, feedback signals, consistent feeding and multiple peripherals.

=== Peripherals ===
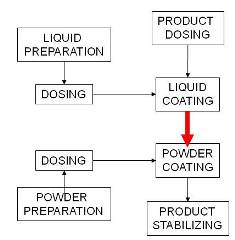
Process in one glance.

Given the number of operations and steps, a coating process can be an extensive process considered as a whole. The process core machine requires peripherals to serve it. A few frequent ones are listed for information.

- Storage
- Ingredient preparation
- Product feeding and metering
- Ingredient dosing
- Filtration or sieving
- Application system
- Recycling

=== Measures ===
Test results can be immediately evaluated (visual aspect) but are preferably assessed by careful measures : to allow monitoring, to agree on commissioning, to certify conformity with customer requirements.

Typical measures :

- Optical : colour, microscopy (homogeneity, thickness), image analysis
- Weighing : weighing before and after treatment, weighing between batches or individual particles
- Specific measurements according to target : compaction, barrier property

== See also ==
- Food processing
