= Pastry chef =

Chef skilled in the preparation of pastries

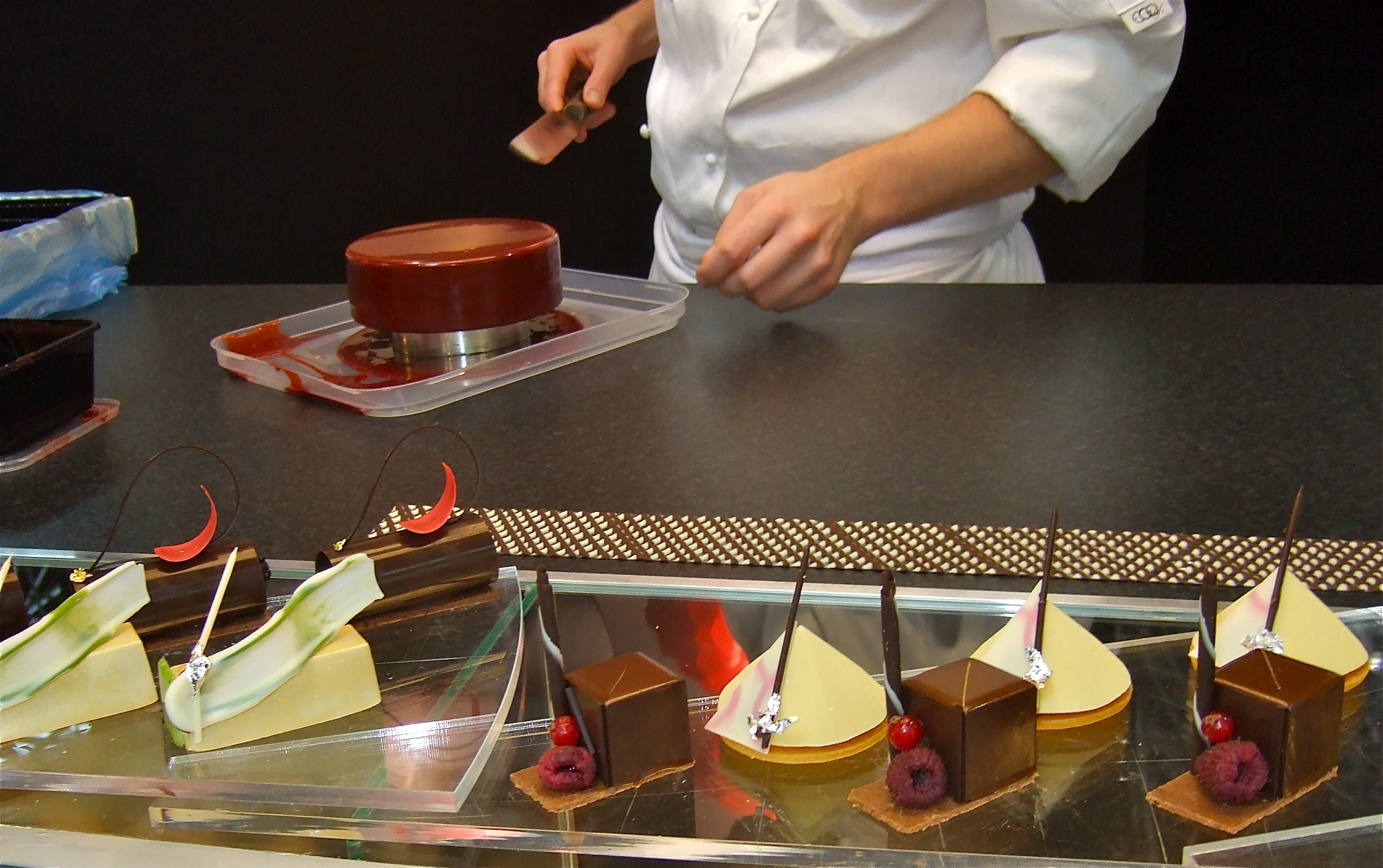
- A pastry chef at work

Occupation
- Occupation type: Profession
- Activity sectors: Pastry

Description
- Competencies: Pastry, dessert expert
- Related jobs: Baker

A pastry chef (Note: French: grand pâtissier [pɑtisje], feminine pâtissière [pɑtisjɛʁ]) is a station chef in a professional kitchen, skilled in the making of pastries, desserts and other baked goods. They are employed in large hotels, bistros, restaurants, bakeries, by caterers, and some cafés.

== Duties and functions ==
The pastry chef is a member of the classic brigade de cuisine in a professional kitchen and is the station chef of the pastry department.

Day-to-day operations can also require the pastry chef to research recipe concepts and develop and test new recipes. Usually, the pastry chef does all the necessary preparation of the various desserts in advance, before dinner seating begins. The actual plating of the desserts is often done by another station chef, usually the garde manger, at the time of order. The pastry chef is often in charge of the dessert menu, which, besides traditional desserts, could include dessert wines, specialty dessert beverages, and gourmet cheese platters.

They are responsible for the creation and execution of dessert courses, as well as the menu's overall presentation. Pastry chefs must have a solid grasp of flavor profiles, baking processes, and food styling in order to create desserts that are both delicious and aesthetically pleasing. In addition to their technical abilities, pastry chefs must be able to work swiftly and effectively under pressure, as they are sometimes required to meet strict deadlines.

Pastry chefs are also expected to fully understand their ingredients and the chemical reactions that occur when making fine pastries. Precise timing and temperatures are critically important. It is generally preferred to weigh the ingredients (i.e., with a kitchen scale) as opposed to measuring by volume (e.g., with a measuring cup), as weighing inherently offers far more consistent baking results.

In larger kitchens, the pastry chef may have a number of other chefs working in their station, each responsible for specific types of pastries:

- pâtissier (baker): responsible for cakes and breakfast pastries
- confiseur (confectioner): responsible for candies and petits fours
- décorateur (decorator): responsible for specialty cakes and show pieces
- glacier (glazier): responsible for cold and frozen desserts

Job requirements

- Proven experience as a pastry chef, baker, or relevant role
- Great attention to detail and creativity
- Organization and leadership skills
- Willingness to replenish professional knowledge
- Thorough knowledge of sanitation principles, food preparation and cooking techniques, and nutrition
- Working knowledge of baking with ingredient limits (gluten-free, sugar-free pastries, etc.)
- Certificate in Culinary Arts, Baking, Patisserie or relevant field

== See also ==
- List of chefs
- List of pastry chefs
- List of restaurant terminology
- Pastry blender
- Pastry brush
