= Basting (cooking) =

Periodically coating cooking meat with sauces

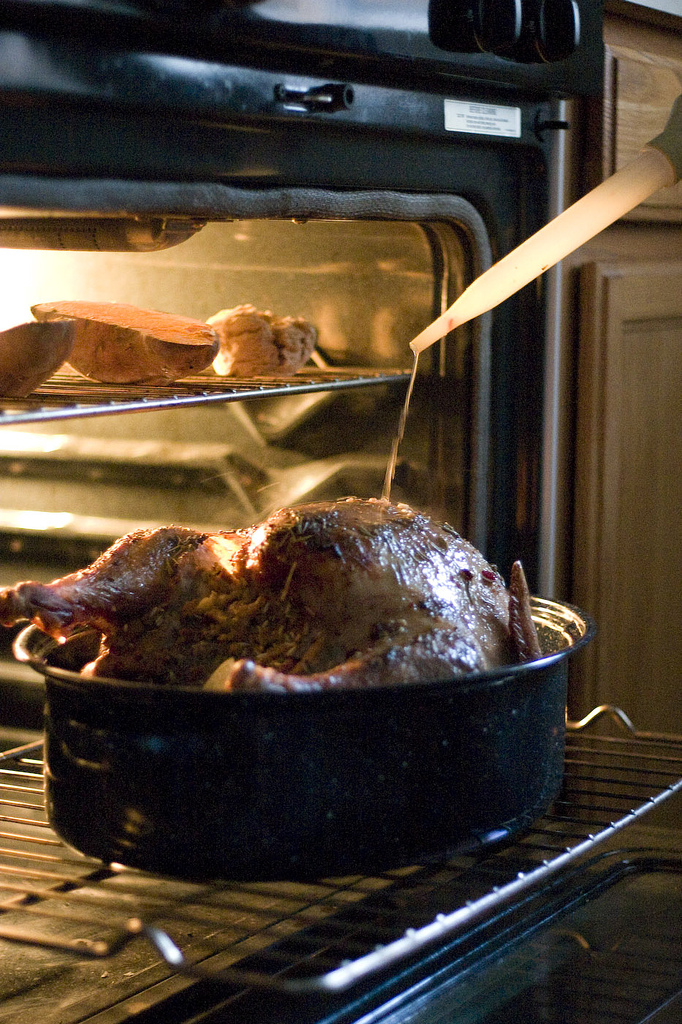
Basting a turkey with a turkey baster

Basting is a cooking technique that involves cooking meat with either its own juices or some type of preparation such as a sauce or marinade, such as barbecue. The meat is left to cook, then periodically coated with the juice.

== Method ==
Prominently used in grilling, rotisserie, roasting, and other meat preparations where the meat is over heat for extended periods of time, basting is used to keep meat moist during the cooking process and also to apply or enhance flavor. Improperly administered basting, however, may actually lead to the very problem it is designed to prevent: the undesired loss of moisture (drying out) of the meat.

If not compensated by countermeasures, the opening of the oven door and the resulting loss of temperature and moisture content of the air circulating inside can lead to increased evaporation from the meat surfaces.

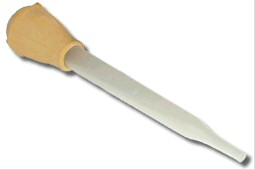
A baster. The flexible rubber end of the baster (beige in the image) can have a different color.

Other alternatives include allowing extended cooking time, administering increased amounts of juices, coating the meat with moisture rich fruits or fat-rich cuts, such as bacon, or actual fat, place moisture rich fruits and vegetables around the cooking meats, and if possible, using a convection oven.

This is a type of cooking usually recommended for dishes that generally taste mild, but are served with sauces that provide complementing or overpowering flavor to them, for example chicken chasseur.

== See also ==
- Kitchen utensil – Tool used for food preparation
- Pastry brush – Cooking utensil used to spread a liquid on food
- Pipette – Liquid-transferring laboratory tool
