= Nappage =

Glazing technique in pastry making

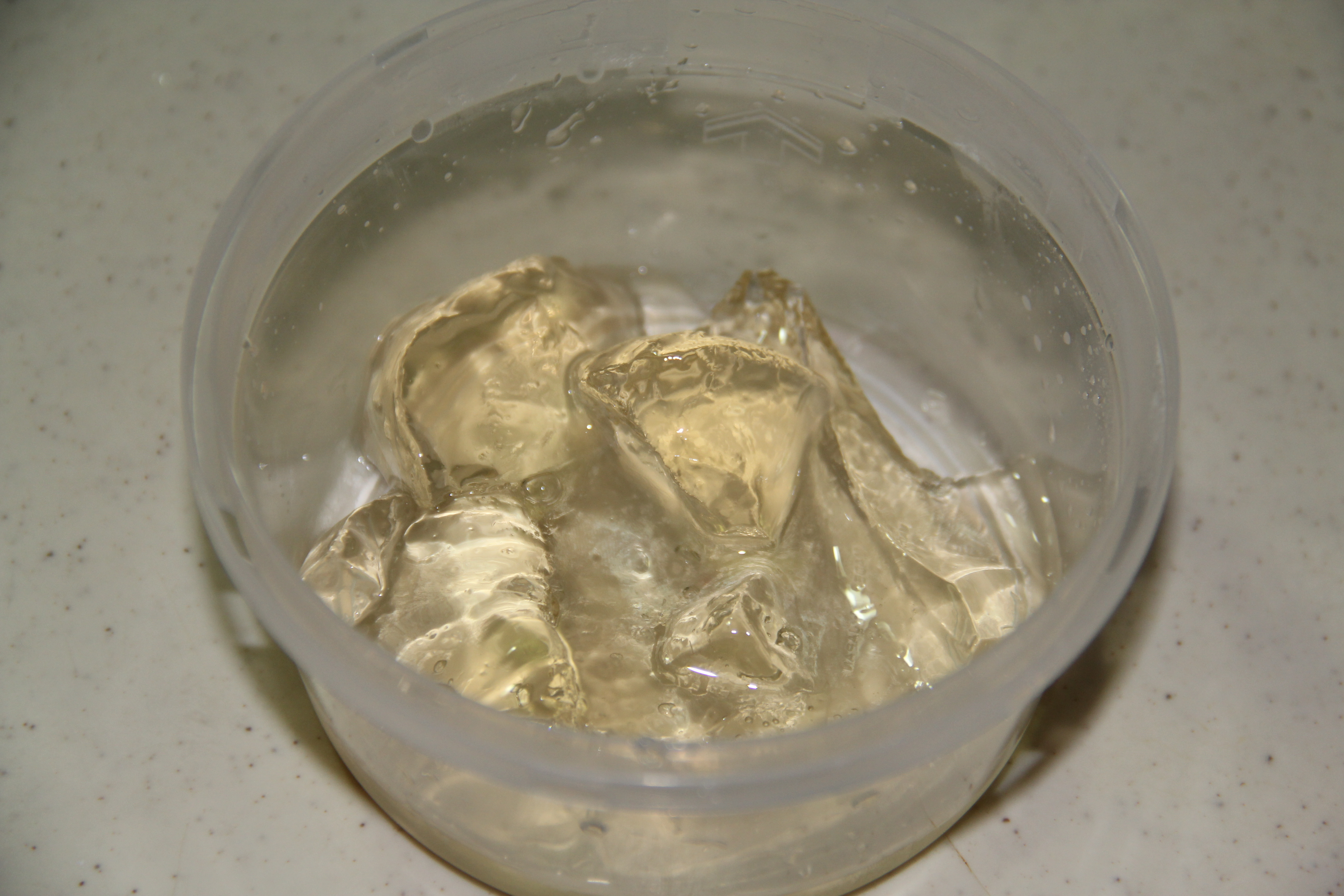
Nappage in a bowl.

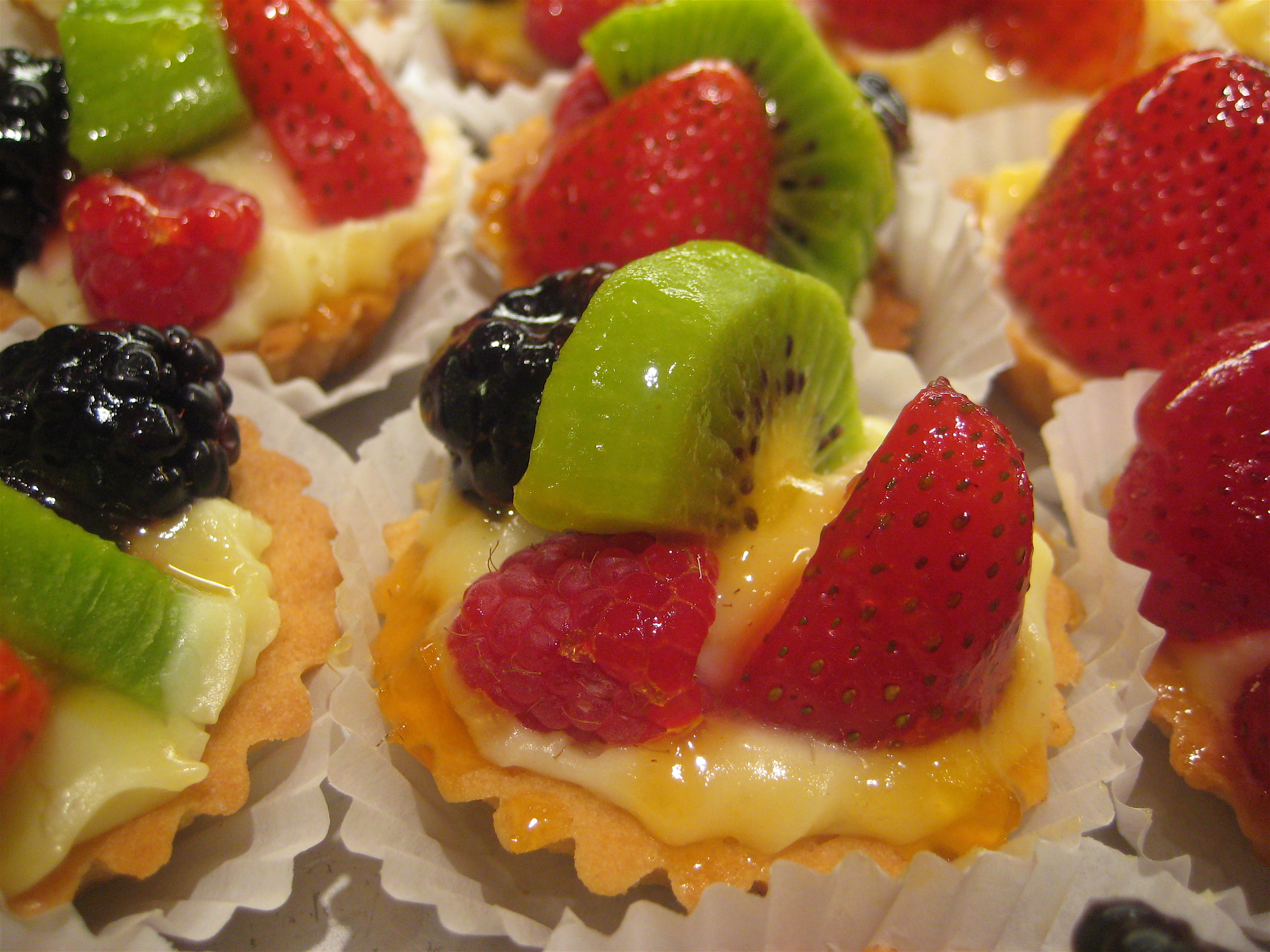
A fruit tart covered with nappage.

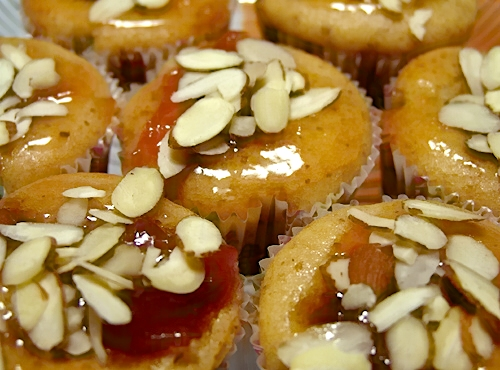
Cupcakes topped with nappage and almonds.

Nappage, jam glaze, pectin glaze or apricot glaze is a glazing technique used in pastry making. The glaze is used to cover fruit on a fruit tart or other baked goods, to make the fruit pieces shiny, prevent them from drying out, and to reduce oxidation (browning of cut fruit).

The active ingredient that gives nappage its glazing properties is pectin, a gelling agent naturally occurring in fruits. Traditionally, a nappage is made using an apricot jam diluted with water to form a transparent, slightly apricot-colored glaze, though redcurrant jelly may be used instead to accentuate the colour of red fruits. A neutral nappage (without the apricot flavour) may be made by mixing pure pectin with water and citric acid (or lemon juice) and heating to 45°C, which precipitates the gelling reaction, creating a base to which a diversity of flavours or colouring agents may be added. Pectin NH (a variety of low methoxyl pectin) is typically used due to its thermoreversibility, which means that glazes made using it may be set and re-melted multiple times. This is useful in a commercial context where nappage may be made in large batches.

== Uses ==
Nappage is typically applied to finished pastries using a pastry brush, dabbing rather than brushing to ensure an even coat. It is applied cool to cold fruits, otherwise it may be applied while still warm, thickening into a gel layer as it cools.

== Etymology ==
Nappage is a French word, meaning 'coating' or 'topping', and deriving from the word napper, meaning "to cover something with sauce".
