= Pastry brush =

Cooking utensil used to spread a liquid on food

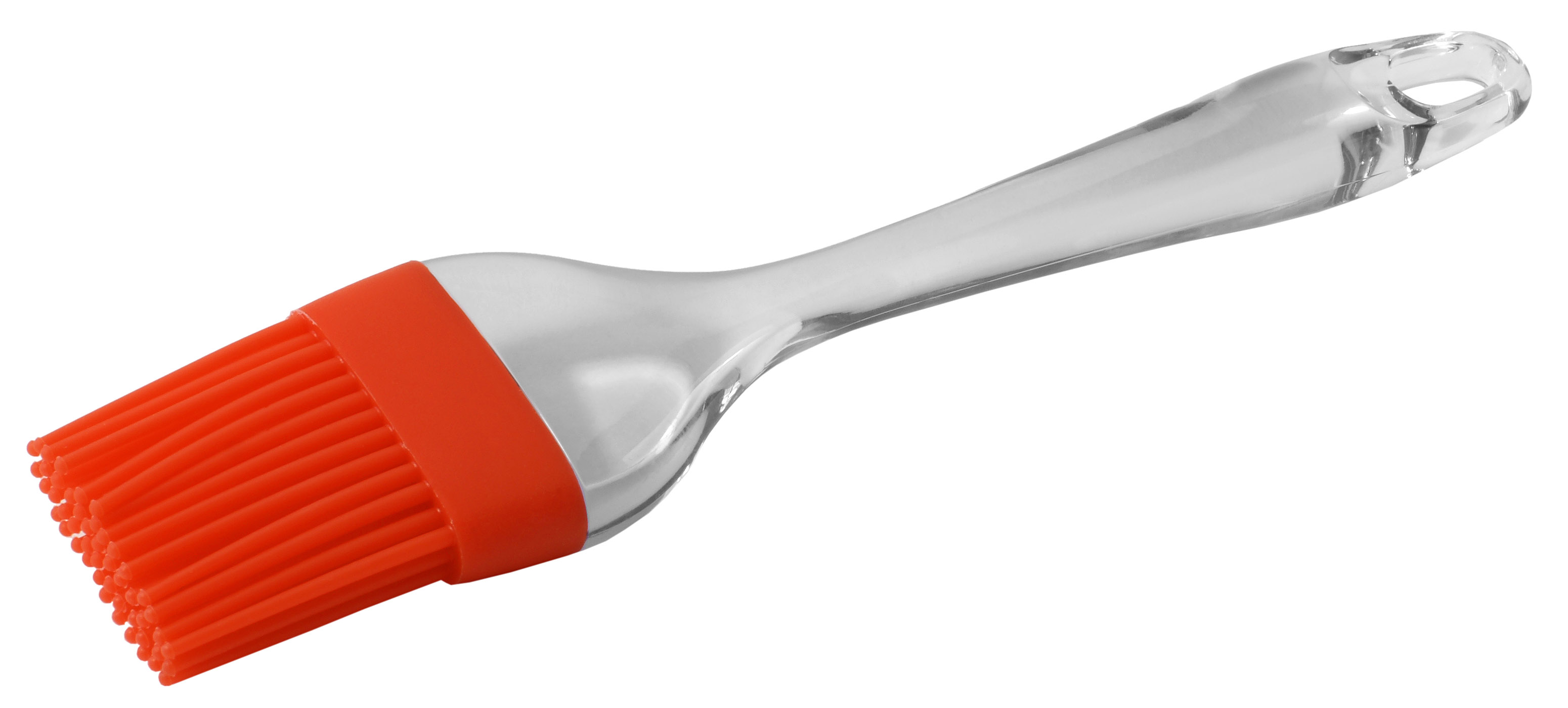
A silicone pastry brush

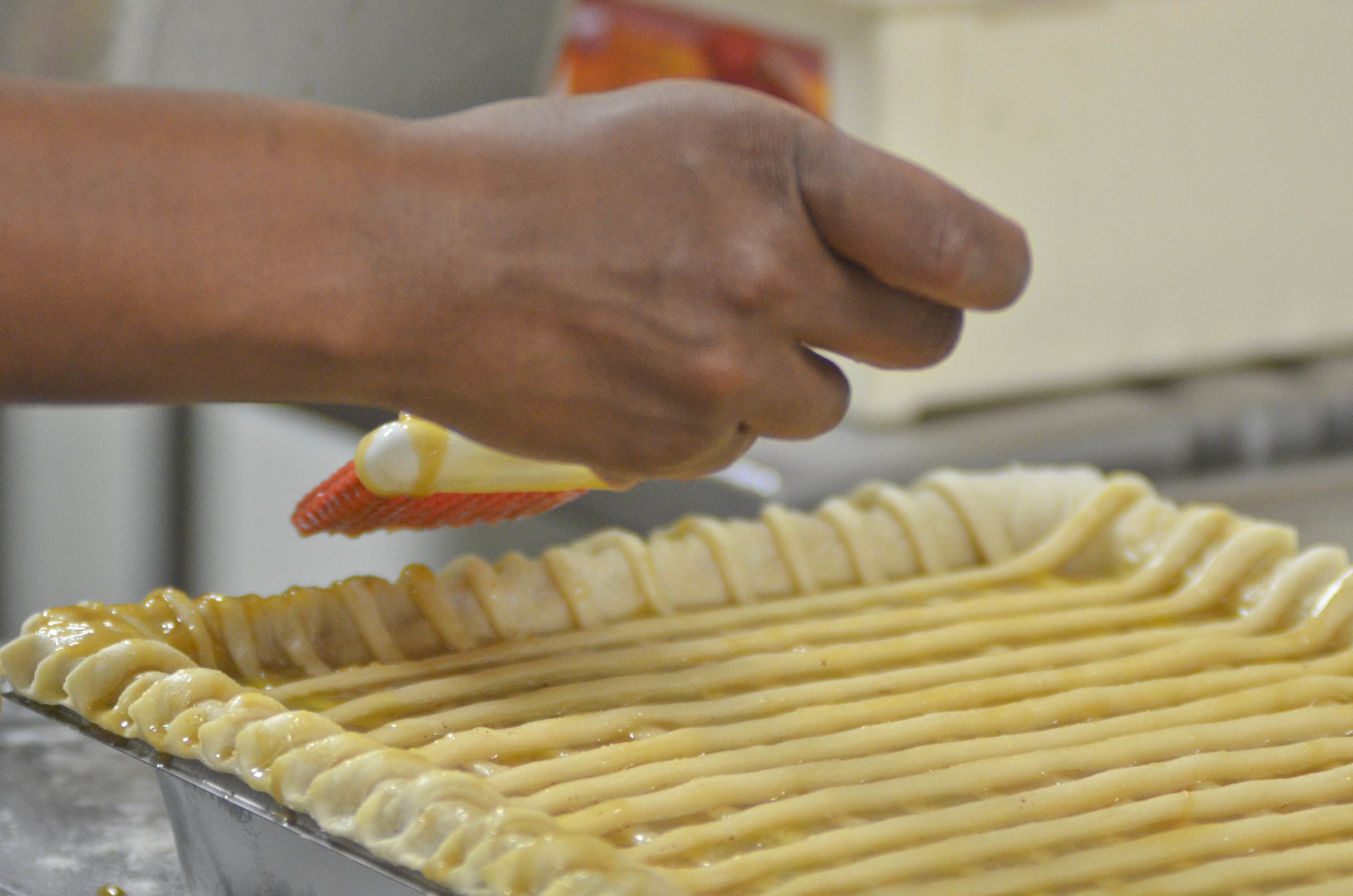
Pastry brush in use

A pastry brush, also known as a basting brush, is a cooking utensil used to spread butter, oil or glaze on food. Traditional pastry brushes are made with natural bristles or a plastic or nylon fiber similar to a paint brush, while modern kitchen brushes may have silicone bristles. In baking breads and pastries, a pastry brush is used to spread a glaze or egg wash on the crust or surface of the food.

In roasting meats, a pastry brush may be used to sop up juices or drippings from under pan and spread them on the surface of the meat to crisp the skin.

== See also ==
- Basting (cooking)
- Pastry chef
- Kitchen utensil
