= Glazing agent =

Substance used for protecting a surface

A glazing agent is a natural or synthetic substance that provides a waxy, homogeneous coating to prevent water loss from a surface and provide other protection.

== Natural ==
Natural glazing agents keep moisture inside plants and insects. Scientists harnessed this characteristic in coatings made of substances classified as waxes. A natural wax is chemically defined as an ester with a very long hydrocarbon chain that also includes a long chain alcohol.

Examples are:

- Stearic acid (E570)
- Beeswax (E901)
- Candelilla wax (E902)
- Carnauba wax (E903)
- Shellac (E904)
- Microcrystalline wax (E905c), Crystalline wax (E907)
- Lanolin (E913)
- Oxidized polyethylene wax (E914)
- Esters of colophonium (E915)
- Paraffin

== Synthetic ==
Scientists have produced glazing agents that mimic their natural counterparts. These components are added in different proportions to achieve the optimal glazing agent for a product. Such products include cosmetics, automobiles and food.

- Some of the characteristics that are looked for in all of the above industries are:
  - 1. Preservation – the glazing agent must protect the product from degradation and water loss. This characteristic can lead to a longer shelf life for a food or the longevity of a car without rusting.
  - 2. Stability – the glazing agent must maintain its integrity under pressure or heat.
  - 3. Uniform viscosity – this ensures a stronger protective coating that can be applied to the product as a homogeneous layer.
  - 4. Industrial reproduction – because most glazing agents are used on commercial goods and therefore large quantities of glazing agent may be needed.

There are different variations of glazing agents, depending on the product, but they are all designed for the same purpose.

== See also ==
- Glaze (cooking technique)
- Food coating, a comprehensive description of this unit operation in a food processing line.
