= Panning (food) =

Coating manufacturing process

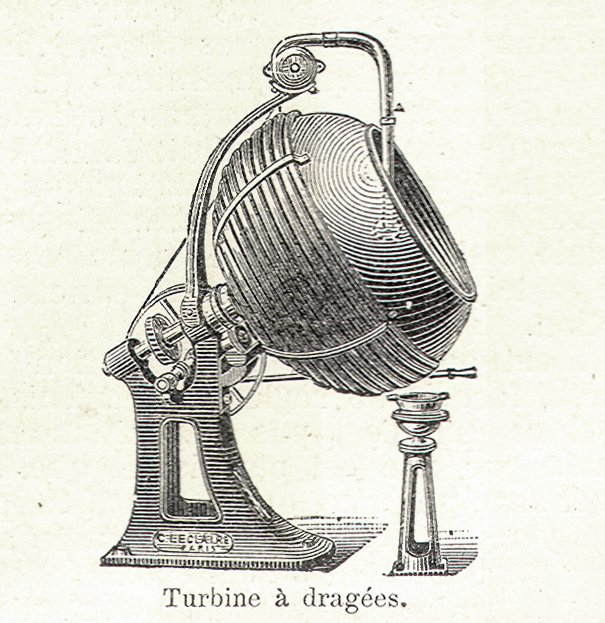
A dragée pan

Panning is a method for adding a coating to a nucleus, such as confectionery or nuts. It generally involves adding a small object to a large pan which contains a liquid or powder. As the pan spins, a coating forms, which is subsequently dried or set.

There are four main types of panning: soft, hard, chocolate and film-and-suspension. The first three are generally used to make confections. Hard panned products are distinguished from soft by the composition of their coating: these are made of solids dissolved into a solvent until saturated. Coatings in chocolate panning are liquified and solidified by heating and cooling, an example of a product produced through this are chocolate-covered raisins. Jelly beans and M&Ms are examples of products coated using soft and hard panning techniques respectively.

Film and suspension panning techniques are primarily used to make medication. Suspensions are formed by mechanically creating a homogeneous mixture that coats a center. Films are produced by spraying the nucleus until a hard shell forms.

== Method ==
Panning usually takes place in a large pan or drum that resembles a cement mixer. Inside, grooves line the walls.

During panning, a small item such as a raisin, nut or piece of chocolate is added to the pan with a liquid or powder. By spinning the pan, the liquids and powders coat the nucleus, either in multiple layers or in a continuous accumulation. As this coating dries or sets, the panned objects jostle together, creating a buffed surface. At the end of the process, a final coating to seal or facilitate polishing is sometimes added to the pan.

== Types ==
Panning can be divided into four main types. Sometimes, more than one technique is applied to make a single panned product.

=== Soft ===
In soft panning, a liquid is added to the pan. After it has coated the kernel, absorbent solids are added until all moisture to the center of the panned product has been absorbed. As these solid particles are added, generally powdered sugar or caster sugar, a lot of aerated dust is created. How hard this final product is depends on how long it is panned, and what ingredients are used. Most of the time, the kernel is made up of a sugar that will not crystallize such as glucose, and the coating produced is relatively thick. An example of soft panned confection are jellybeans.

=== Hard ===
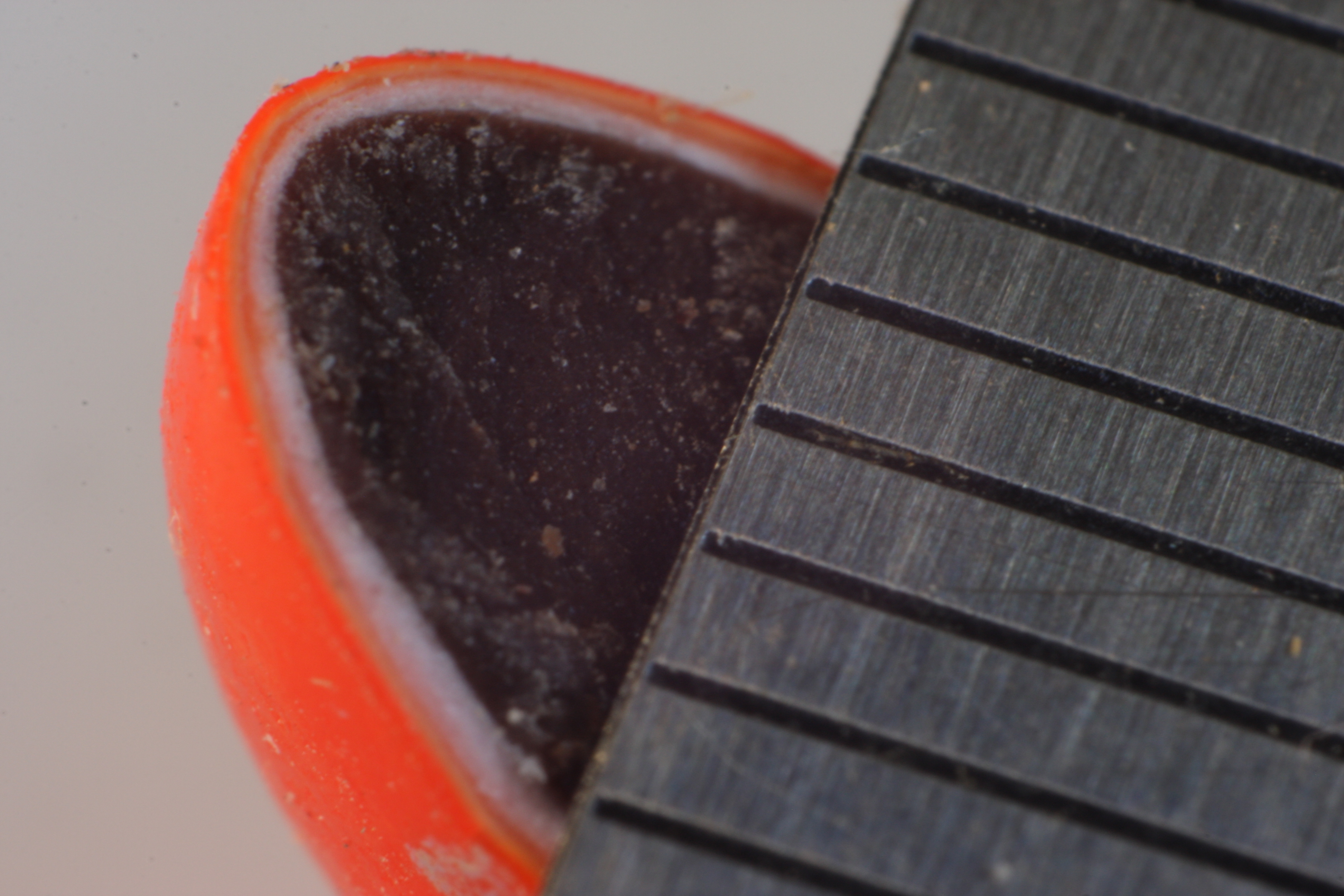
An M&M chocolate button with a ruler marked in millimeters showing the layers of the panned shell.

Hard panning proceeds in the same way as soft panning, but with a different coating. Coatings used in hard panning are solids dissolved in a solvent until the mixture has become saturated. In the confectionery industry, the solvent is usually water, and the solid is usually sugar. Although by raising the temperature the mixture can become more saturated, allowing it to dry faster, most hard panning today takes place at low temperatures to avoid compromising the center's integrity. Hard-panned layers take longer to dry than soft panned products and can be as thin as 10-14μm. M&Ms are an example of a product produced through hard panning.

=== Chocolate ===
Chocolate panning uses temperature changes to apply the coating. In the technique, a warmed liquid is applied to the nucleus, coating it, and is then cooled to harden. As this is repeated, the coating forms. Although this technique is usually done with chocolate, yogurt and compound chocolates are also sometimes used. The most popular centers used in chocolate panning are raisins and nuts.

=== Film and suspension ===
These techniques resemble hard panning. Suspensions are formed by mixing ingredients and putting them in a colloid mill. The now homogeneous mixture is sprayed onto a kernel. If the dissolved particles are polymers, spraying the suspension continuously forms a hardened coat referred to as a film. The process is faster than other techniques and produces a more even product.

The two techniques are mainly used in pharmaceuticals, as it often uses solvents such as alcohols and esthers which are not considered food safe. These chemicals are explosively volatile and may cause environmental contamination; as a result they are handled carefully. Some machines using them are modified with side vents to capture these solvents for reuse. Rarely used in the confectionery industry, suspensions are used as an alternative to soft panning, avoiding the dust the process usually creates.

== Materials ==
Many types of center may be used, but they must be strong enough to not break during the tumbling. Nuts should be dried and sealed, such as with gum arabic and flour, to prevent oils from escaping and discoloring the candy shell. Other centers may be precoated for sealing or to improve the syrup sticking to the center. Chewing gum is difficult to pan without precoating.

== History ==
The first uses of panning were medicinal. To hide the strong, bitter taste of pills, Abu Bakr al-Razi coated them with slime from psyllium seeds in the 10th century. Over the following centuries, other coatings such as honey, silver and gold were applied for the same purpose.

Around 1200, likely the first mouth-sized confectionery-coated products were created in Nîmes, France. In cookware, ingredients were mixed and dried before being separated by hand. This could be done in an intensive process of maneuvering a pan, hung over a fire from the ceiling using ropes.

In the mid-19th century, a French confectioner mounted a pan on a shaft. The contraption could be manually turned. The principle underlying this device has been the basis of panning technologies created since, even as they have become increasingly complicated.

== See also ==
- Enrober — a machine that typically covers confections with chocolate

== Sources ==
- Aebi, Marcel; Fowler, Mark S. (2017). "Chocolate panning". In Beckett, Stephen T.; Fowler, Mark S; Ziegler, Gregory R (eds.). Beckett's Industrial Chocolate Manufacture and Use (5th ed.). Chichester, UK: Wiley. ISBN 978-1-118-78014-5.
- Jackson, E. B. (1995). Sugar Confectionery Manufacture (2nd ed.). Springer. ISBN 978-0-8342-1297-8.
