= Enrober =

Machine to coat a food item

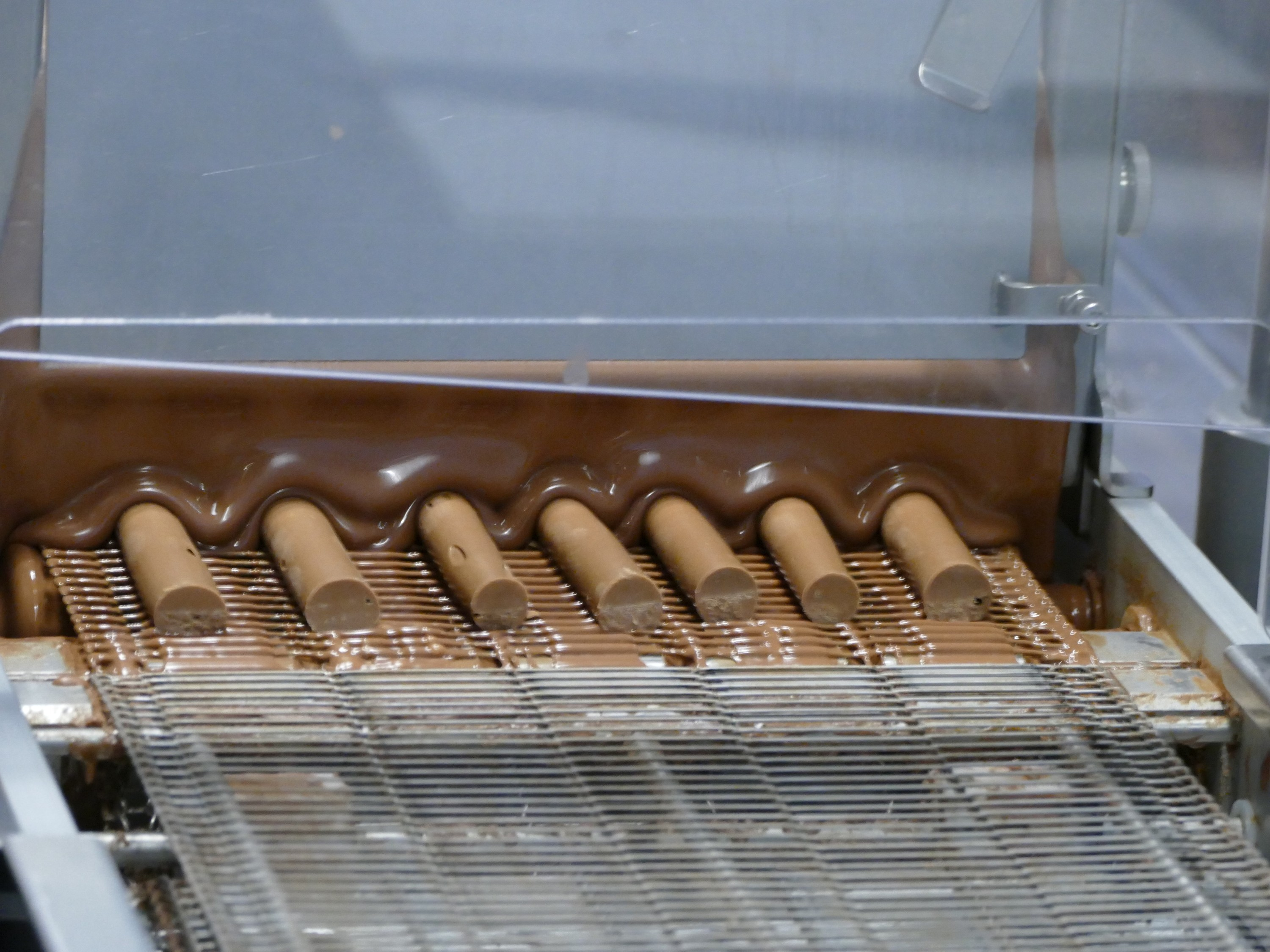
An enrobing machine in operation

An enrober is a machine used in the confectionery industry to coat a food item with a coating medium, typically chocolate. Frequently enrobed foods include nuts, ice cream, toffee, chocolate bars, biscuits, and cookies. In addition to its effects on the flavor and mouthfeel, enrobing with chocolate extends a confection's shelf life.

== Process ==
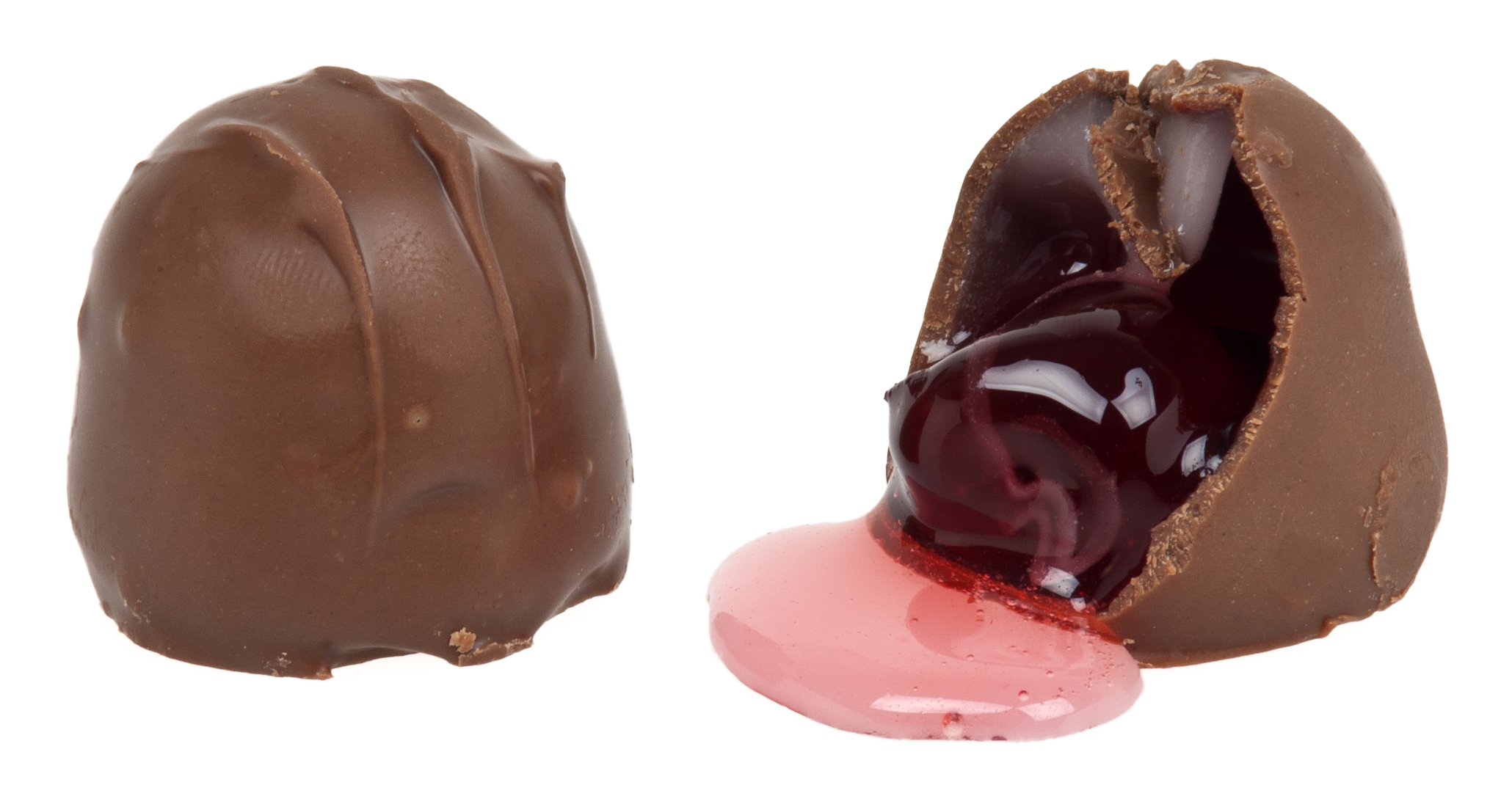
Chocolate-coated cherry

The process of enrobing involves placing the items on the enrober's feed band, which may consist of a wire mesh or containers in which the confections to be enrobed are placed, with each container having drain holes to recover excess chocolate. The enrober maintains the coating medium at a controlled constant temperature and pumps the medium into a flow pan. The medium flows from the flow pan in a continuous curtain and bottoming bed that the food items pass through, completely coating them. A wire mesh conveyor belt then transports the coated confection to a cooling area.

Output mainly comes from the belt width and cooling tunnel length. Excluding compound chocolate, most chocolates need to spend eight minutes in a cooling tunnel.

== History ==
The enrober machine was invented in France in 1903, brought to the United States, and perfected to perform the work of at least twenty people.

== See also ==
- Sugar panning, a method to cover a candy or nut with a hard candy shell
- Couverture chocolate, a form of chocolate with a high proportion of cocoa butter, used in dipping and coating
- Food coating
