= Individual quick freezing =

Class of freezing methods

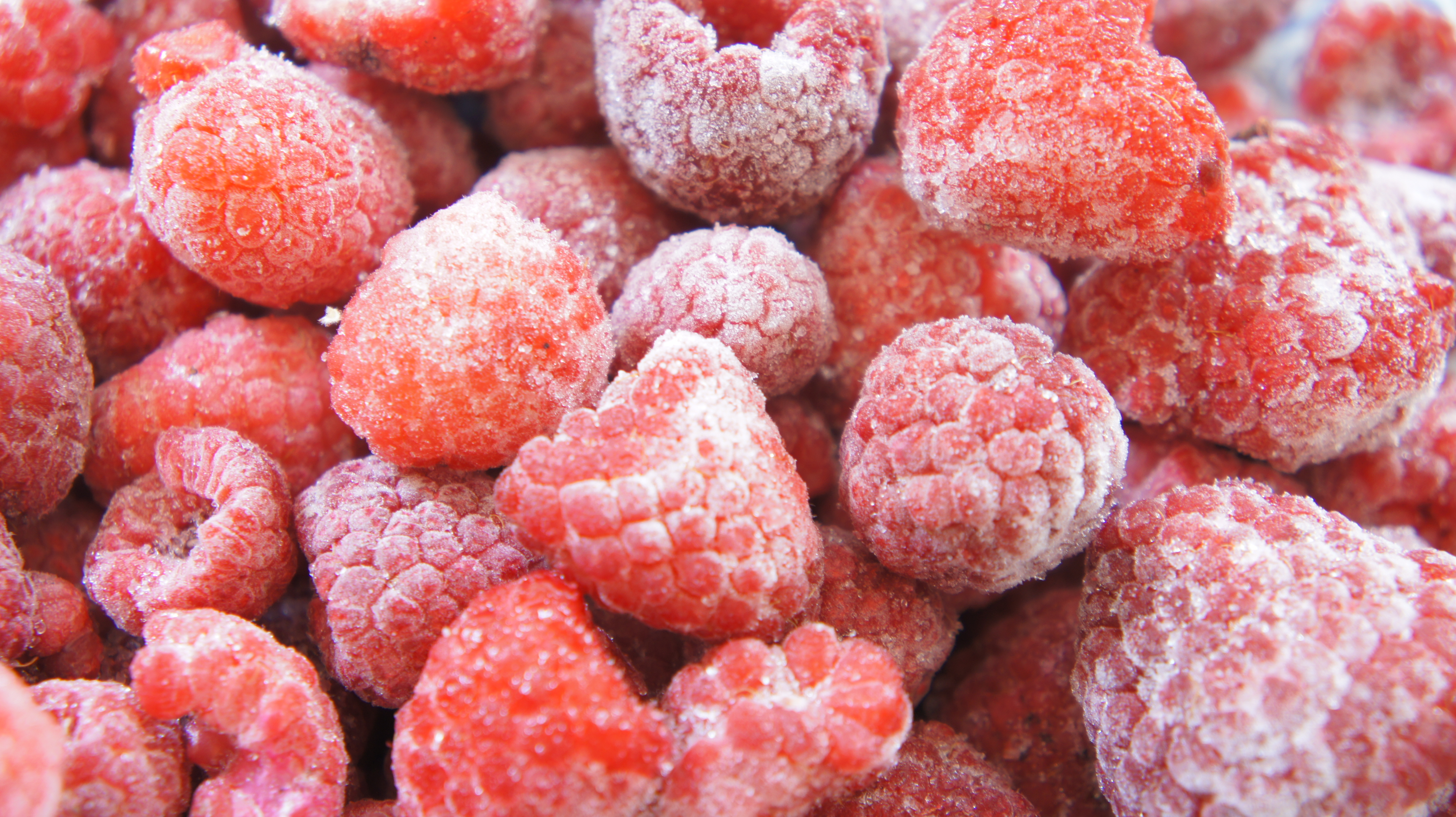
Frozen Raspberries

Individual quick freezing, usually abbreviated IQF, is a descriptive term for freezing methods used in the food processing industry. The food is in individual pieces, and is frozen quickly. Products commonly frozen with IQF technologies are typically smaller pieces of food, and can include berries, fruits and vegetables both diced or sliced, seafood such as shrimp and small fish, meat, poultry, pasta, cheese and grains. Products that have been subjected to IQF are referred to as individually quick frozen.

== Benefits ==
One of the main advantages of this method of preparing frozen food is that the freezing process takes only a few minutes. The exact time depends on the type of IQF freezer and the product. The short freezing prevents formation of large ice crystals in the product's cells, which destroys the membrane structures at the molecular level. This makes the product keep its shape, colour, smell and taste after defrost, to a far greater extent.

Another advantage of IQF technology is its ability to separate units of the products during freezing, which produces a higher quality product compared to block freezing. This is important for food sustainability, as the consumer can defrost and use the exact quantity needed.

A growing demand in IQF products is registered at global level due to the higher quality of these products and to the benefit of having separately frozen pieces. IQF is also a common pre-treatment for freeze-drying food because both processes preserve the size, taste and cell structure of the food better than methods such as traditional block freezing or air drying.

== Methods ==
There is a range of IQF technologies, but the main concept is to transport the product into the freezer with the help of a processing line belt or infeed shaker. Inside the freezer, the product travels through the freezing zone and exits the other side. Product transport inside the freezer uses different technologies. Some freezers use transport belts similar to a conveyor belt. Others use bed plates that hold the product, and an asymmetrical movement makes the plate advance by itself through the freezer. There are two main IQF technologies: mechanical IQF freezers and cryogenic IQF freezers.

Mechanical IQF freezers work on the principle of cold air circulation, which flows from underneath the bed plate or transport belt with the help of fans. The cold airflow passes through the pieces of product in circular motions while the product is also advancing through the freezer towards the exit. The design and efficiency of this type of IQF freezers varies among manufacturers who seek to find the perfect balance of aerodynamics for an optimal freezing result. This technology has seen impressive improvements and developments during the past 20 years, being suited for an increasing range of products.

Cryogenic IQF freezers immerse the product in liquid nitrogen at very low temperatures, freezing it rapidly while continuously moving the product to avoid block or lump formation. Although this method shows good freezing results, it might lead to higher processing costs per weight of product due to the cost of the liquid nitrogen required.

== See also ==
- Frozen food
