= Calcium lactate =

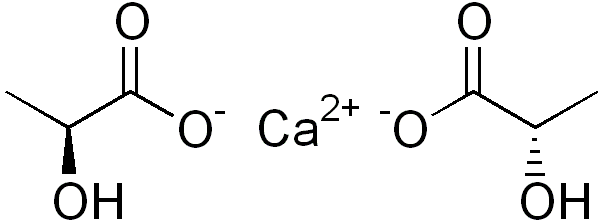
- Calcium L-lactate

Names
- Preferred IUPAC name Calcium bis(2-hydroxypropanoate)
- Other names: calcium lactate 5-hydrate; calcium lactate; 2-hydroxypropanoic acid; calcium salt pentahydrate

Identifiers
CAS Number	814-80-2
3D model (JSmol)	Interactive image
ChEMBL	ChEMBL2106111
ChemSpider	12592
DrugBank	DB13231
ECHA InfoCard	100.011.278
EC Number	212-406-7
E number	E327 (antioxidants, ...)
PubChem CID	13144
UNII	2URQ2N32W3
CompTox Dashboard (EPA)	DTXSID0020236
- InChI: InChI=1S/2C3H6O3.Ca/c2*1-2(4)3(5)6;/h2*2,4H,1H3,(H,5,6);/q;;+2/p-2 Key: MKJXYGKVIBWPFZ-UHFFFAOYSA-L; InChI=1/2C3H6O3.Ca/c2*1-2(4)3(5)6;/h2*2,4H,1H3,(H,5,6);/q;;+2/p-2 Key: MKJXYGKVIBWPFZ-NUQVWONBAM
- SMILES: [Ca+2].[O-]C(=O)C(O)C.[O-]C(=O)C(O)C

Properties
Chemical formula	C_{6}H_{10}CaO_{6}
Molar mass	218.22 g/mol
Appearance	white or off-white powder, slightly efflorescent
Density	1.494 g/cm^{3}
Melting point	240 °C (464 °F; 513 K) (anhydrous); 120 °C (pentahydrate)
Solubility in water	L-lactate, anhydrous, g/100 mL: 4.8 (10 °C), 5.8 (20 °C), 6.7 (25 °C), 8.5 (30 °C); 7.9 g/100 mL (30 °C)
Solubility	very soluble in methanol, insoluble in ethanol
Acidity (pK_{a})	6.0-8.5
Refractive index (n_{D})	1.470

Pharmacology
ATC code	A12AA05 (WHO)

Hazards
- GHS labelling
Pictograms	(GHS07: Exclamation mark)
Signal word	Warning
Hazard statements	H319
Precautionary statements	P264, P280, P305+P351+P338, P337+P313
NFPA 704 (fire diamond)	1 0 0
Flash point	Not applicable
Autoignition temperature	No data
- Except where otherwise noted, data are given for materials in their standard state (at 25 °C [77 °F], 100 kPa). verify (what is ?) Infobox references

Calcium lactate is a white crystalline salt with formula C_{6}H_{10}CaO_{6}, consisting of two lactate anions H_{3}C(CHOH)CO_{2}^{–} for each calcium cation Ca^{2+}. It forms several hydrates, the most common being the pentahydrate C_{6}H_{10}CaO_{6}·5H_{2}O.

Calcium lactate is used in medicine, mainly to treat calcium deficiencies; and as a food additive with E number of E327. Some cheese crystals consist of calcium lactate.

== Properties ==
The lactate ion is chiral, with two enantiomers, D (−,R) and L (+,S). The L isomer is the one normally synthesized and metabolized by living organisms, but some bacteria can produce the D form or convert the L to D. Thus calcium lactate also has D and L isomers, where all anions are of the same type.

Some synthesis processes yield a mixture of the two in equal parts, resulting in the DL (racemic) salt. Both the L and the DL forms occur as crystals on the surface of aging Cheddar cheese.

The solubility of calcium L-lactate in water increases significantly in presence of d-gluconate ions, from 6.7 g/dl at 25 °C to 9.74 g/dl or more. Paradoxically, while the solubility of calcium L-lactate increases with temperature from 10 °C (4.8 g/dl) to 30 °C (8.5 g/dl), the concentration of free Ca^{2+} ions decreases by almost one half. This is explained as the lactate and calcium ions becoming less hydrated and forming a complex C_{3}H_{5}O_{3}Ca^{+}.

The DL (racemic) form of the salt is much less soluble in water than the pure L or D isomers, so that a solution that contains as little as 25% of the D form will deposit racemic DL-lactate crystals instead of L-lactate.

The pentahydrate loses water in a dry atmosphere between 35 and 135 °C, being reduced to the anhydrous form and losing its crystalline character. The process is reversed at 25 °C and 75% relative humidity.

In aqueous solutions, calcium lactate partially dissociates into calcium ions (Ca^{2+}) and lactate ions (C_{3}H_{5}O_{3}^{−}). The lactate ion, being the conjugate base of lactic acid (a weak acid), can undergo slight hydrolysis, making the solution mildly alkaline. This reaction increases the concentration of hydroxide ions (OH^{−}), resulting in a solution with a pH slightly above 7, that is, basic. Here are approximate pH values for calcium lactate solutions at various concentrations:

Approximate pH Values of Aqueous Calcium Lactate Solutions at Different Concentrations
Concentration of Calcium Lactate (mol/L)	Approximate pH
0.01	7.4 – 7.6
0.05	7.6 – 7.8
0.10	7.8 – 8.0
0.20	8.0 – 8.2

Calcium lactate pentahydrate has solubility in water of or 79 g/L at 25 °C. That property makes calcium lactate readily available for absorption when consumed. It is more soluble than some other calcium salts, such as citrate (which has solubility of 0.85 g/L at 25 °C).

== Preparation ==
Calcium lactate can be prepared by the reaction of lactic acid with calcium carbonate or calcium hydroxide.

Since the 19th century, the salt has been obtained industrially by fermentation of carbohydrates in the presence of calcium mineral sources such as calcium carbonate or calcium hydroxide. Fermentation may produce either D or L lactate, or a racemic mixture of both, depending on the type of organism used.

== Uses ==
=== Medicine ===
Calcium lactate has several uses in human and veterinary medicine.

It is also used to treat hypocalcaemia (calcium deficiencies). It can be absorbed at various pHs, thus it does not need to be taken with food. However, in this use it has been found to be less convenient than calcium citrate. Calcium lactate contains 13% elemental calcium.

In the early 20th century, oral administration of calcium lactate dissolved in water (but not in milk or tablets) was found to be effective in prevention of tetany in humans and dogs with parathyroid insufficiency or who underwent parathyroidectomy.

The compound is also found in some mouth washes and toothpaste as an anti-tartar agent.

Calcium lactate (or other calcium salts) is an antidote for soluble fluoride ingestion and hydrofluoric acid.

While aqueous solutions of calcium lactate exhibit a slightly basic (above 7) pH due to the slight hydrolysis of lactate ions, calcium lactate is not used in medicine as an antacid. The reasons lie in its chemical properties and physiological behavior in the gastrointestinal tract. Calcium lactate has insufficient acid-neutralizing capacity caused by its weak base formation. The lactate ion (C_{3}H_{5}O_{3}^{−}) is the conjugate base of lactic acid, which is a weak acid. When calcium lactate dissolves in water, it releases lactate ions that can slightly increase the pH of the aqueous solution. The degree of hydroxide ion (OH^{−}) generation through lactate ion hydrolysis is minimal, making the solution only mildly basic.

Calcium lactate is more soluble in water compared to other calcium salts such as calcium citrate or carbonate, leading to quicker absorption in the small intestine rather than reacting in the stomach. The slight increase in pH from calcium lactate is rapidly buffered by the stomach's acidic environment, as such, it does not provide the rapid pH shift needed to relieve symptoms of hyperacidity. As such, the role of calcium lactate is to supply calcium ions to the body—a source of bioavailable calcium. Calcium lactate is a well-absorbed and generally safe form of calcium supplementation that does not interfere with digestion. Its properties allow it to be used effectively without disrupting normal gastrointestinal function, making it suitable for individuals seeking to increase their calcium intake without affecting their digestive processes. Calcium lactate does not interact significantly with digestive enzymes or other components of the gastrointestinal tract. It dissolves and releases calcium ions that are absorbed in the small intestine without affecting the digestion of proteins, carbohydrates, or fats.

=== Food industry ===
The compound is a food additive classified by the United States FDA as generally recognized as safe (GRAS), for uses as a firming agent, a flavor enhancer or flavoring agent, a leavening agent, a nutritional supplement, and a stabilizer and thickener.

Calcium lactate is also known as cheese lactate because it coagulates milk, making the chhena used in the production of paneer cheese. Chhena is also used to make various sweets and other milk proteins.

Calcium lactate is an ingredient in some baking powders containing sodium acid pyrophosphate. It provides calcium in order to delay leavening.

Calcium lactate is added to sugar-free foods to prevent tooth decay. When added to chewing gum containing xylitol, it increases the remineralization of tooth enamel.

The compound is also added to fresh-cut fruits, such as cantaloupes, to keep them firm and extend their shelf life, without the bitter taste caused by calcium chloride, which can also be used for this purpose.

Calcium lactate is used in molecular gastronomy as a flavorless fat-soluble agent for plain and reverse spherification. It reacts with sodium alginate to form a skin around the food item.

=== Animal feeds ===
Calcium lactate may be added to animal rations as a source of calcium.

=== Chemistry ===
The compound was formerly an intermediate in the preparation of lactic acid for food and medical uses. The impure acid from various sources was converted to calcium lactate, purified by crystallization, and then converted back to acid by treatment with sulfuric acid, which precipitated the calcium as calcium sulfate. This method yielded a purer product than would be obtained by distillation of the original acid. Recently ammonium lactate has been used as an alternative to calcium in this process.

=== Water treatment ===
Calcium lactate has been considered as a coagulant for removing suspended solids from water, as a renewable, non-toxic, and biodegradable alternative to aluminum chloride AlCl_{3}.

=== Bioconcrete ===
Addition of calcium lactate substantially increases the compressive strength and reduces water permeability of bioconcrete, by enabling bacteria such as Enterococcus faecalis, Bacillus cohnii, Bacillus pseudofirmus and Sporosarcina pasteurii to produce more calcite.

== See also ==
- Calcium supplement
- Calcium lactate gluconate
- Calcium gluconate
- Calcium citrate
