= Reverse spherification =

Molecular Gastronomy

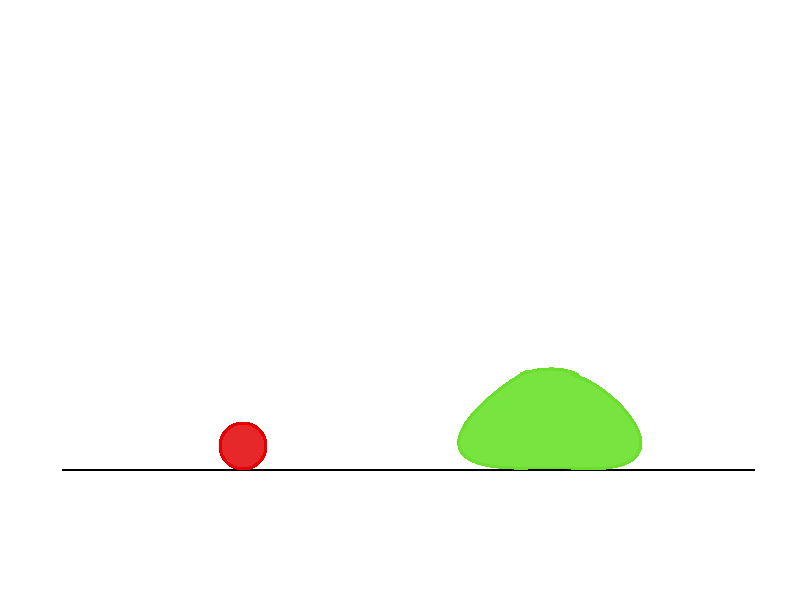
A typical product obtained from direct spherification (left), and a typical product of reverse spherification (right)

Reverse spherification is a method of molecular gastronomy. This method is similar to spherification, different in that it is used to enclose liquid containing alcohol content, as well as liquid with calcium content such as milk and yogurt. When the liquid containing alcohol or calcium salt is dropped into an alginate bath, the liquid will draw itself into a spherical shape and becomes encapsulated by the gel-like membrane formed by the cross-linking of the calcium ions and the alginate polymer strands. Larger spheres can be created using reverse spherification. After removing the jelly from the alginate bath, calcium would not continue to diffuse into the center of the sphere, therefore would not create a gel center. Longer storage time could be obtained for this product accordingly.

Both the liquid for consumption and the alginate bath should be left to stand after preparation to eliminate air bubbles. Air bubbles within the liquid could lead to the flavorful liquid's inability to sink properly when dropped into the alginate bath, resulting in uneven skin and weak spots in the product.

== Important factors for reverse spherification ==
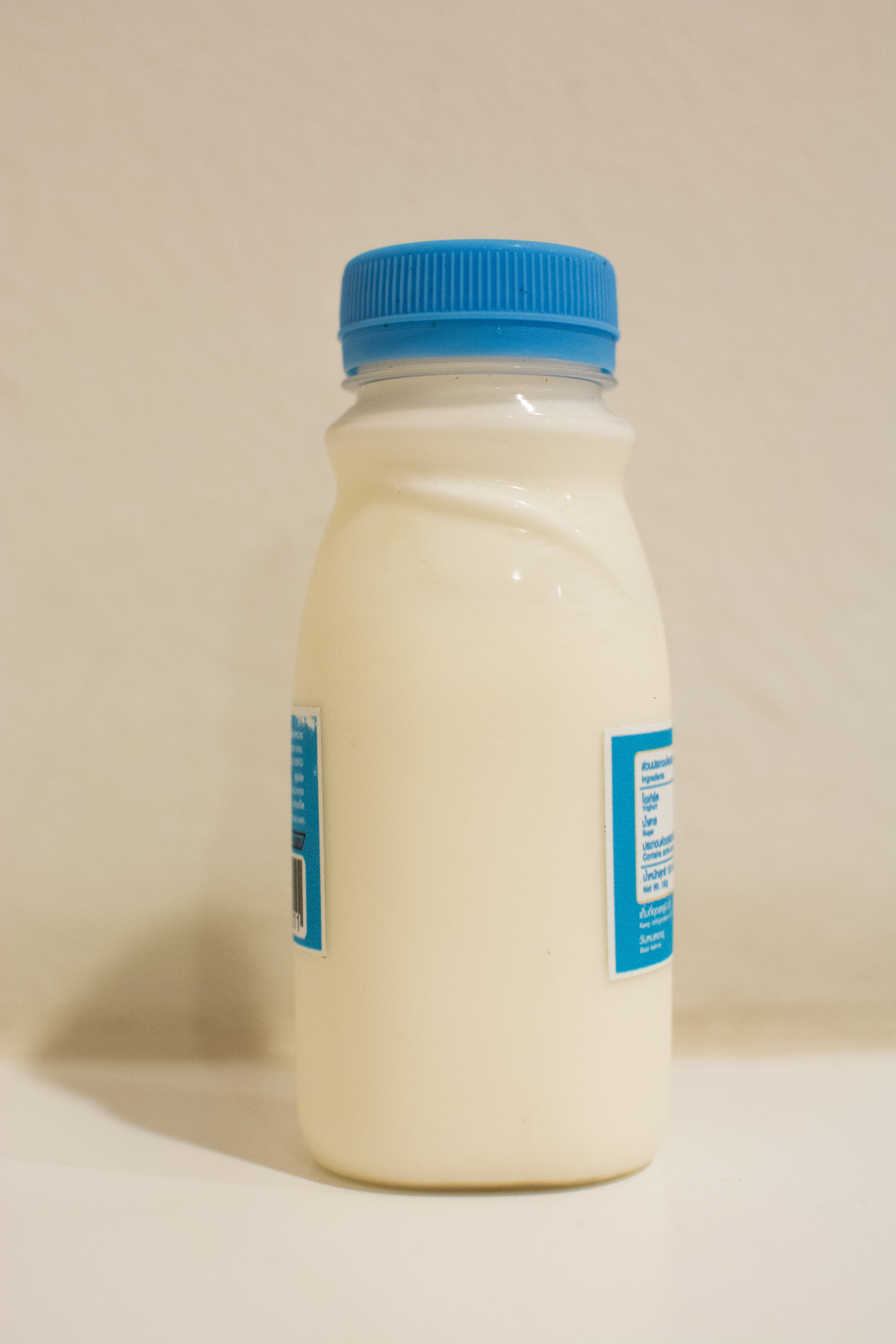
Yogurt, with its high calcium content, is an example of a liquid that can be used for reverse spherification

There are two factors that need to be or can be adjusted for successful reverse spherification. The first is the amount of free calcium ions and density of the liquid to be made for spherification. The amount of free calcium ions needs to be sufficient in order to form a gel-like capsule reaction with sodium alginate. Milk based products such as cream, yogurt or milk already have a sufficient amount of calcium. However, conducting reverse spherification with a liquid containing insufficient calcium ion concentrations, calcium salt could be added to the liquid; for example, calcium lactate gluconate could be added to a liquid to produce a 2% concentration in the liquid creating an effective solution for conducting reverse spherification. Calcium ions from calcium lactate is responsible for providing a gelling process without increasing the pH of the food to be too high and the gel will not melt once heated. Secondly, the density of the liquid needs to be adjusted in order to allow the sufficient surface tension to form a spherical shape. Xanthan gum can be used in order to increase the viscosity of the liquid. Usually, the concentration of xanthan gum ranges between 0.2% and 0.5%.
