= MSA =

MSA or M.S.A. may refer to:

== Organizations and businesses ==
=== Public services and agencies ===
- China Maritime Safety Administration, a PRC Coast Guard
- Maritime Safety Agency, now the Japan Coast Guard
- Indonesian Maritime Security Agency
- Pakistan Maritime Security Agency
- Mutual Security Agency, established by the U.S. Mutual Security Act (1951), and distributed aid to Europe after the Marshall Plan
- Myanmar Space Agency

=== Academic ===
- Mariological Society of America, a society for the study of Mary, mother of Jesus
- Metaphysical Society of America, a society promoting the study of philosophy and metaphysics
- Microscopy Society of America, a society for the promotion of microscopy
- Mineralogical Society of America, an organization for the advancement of mineralogy
- Mycological Society of America, a society promoting the study of fungi

=== Commercial ===
- Malaysia–Singapore Airlines, the former name for Singapore Airlines and Malaysia Airlines
- Masonic Service Association, a Freemasonry publishing resource
- Master service agreement, a master agreement defining services to be delivered
- Mine Safety Appliances, a manufacturer of industrial safety clothing and equipment
- Poste Air Cargo ( ICAO code MSA)

=== Other organizations ===
- Maine Snowmobile Association, the snowmobile association of Maine
- Manchester Society of Architects, a professional society for architects in the Greater Manchester area, UK
- Motor Sports Association, the governing body for motorsport in the UK
- Mad Science Alliance, a fictional organization in and the working title of the 2008 role-playing game Monster Lab
- Movement for the Salvation of Azawad

== Education ==
=== Degrees ===
- Master of Advanced Studies in Sports Administration, a sports management degree
- Master of Accountancy, an accounting degree
- Master of Science in Administration, a degree providing preparation for administrative positions

=== Schools and societies ===
- Mackintosh School of Architecture, an architecture school in Glasgow, Scotland
- Manchester School of Architecture, an architecture school in Manchester, England
- Middle States Association of Colleges and Schools, an evaluation and accreditation association
- Minnesota Math and Science Academy, a school in Minnesota
- Mississippi School of the Arts, a high school in Brookhaven, Mississippi
- Missouri Scholars Academy, a summer program at the University of Missouri
- Montessori School of Anderson, a private school in Anderson, South Carolina
- MSA Mutfak Sanatlari Akademisi, a culinary arts institute in Istanbul, Turkey
- Modern Sciences and Arts University, a university in October City, Egypt
- Muslim Students' Association, a group dedicated to Islamic societies on college campuses in Canada and the US

== Language ==
- Mainland Southeast Asia linguistic area, a sprachbund in Southeast Asia
- Malay language, in the ISO 639-2 and ISO 639-3 language code
- Modern Standard Arabic, also known as Literary Arabic, the standard and literary variety of Arabic used in writing and in most formal speech

== Laws and legal agreements ==
- Magnuson-Stevens Act, common alternate abbreviation of 1976 Magnuson–Stevens Fishery Conservation and Management Act (MSFCMA)
- Mapping Services Agreement, a licensing contract between local authorities in the UK and suppliers of geographic data
- Matthew Shepard Act, 2009 US federal hate-crime legislation
- Mutual Security Act (1951), which established the Mutual Security Agency to distribut aid to Europe after the Marshall Plan
- Tobacco Master Settlement Agreement, an agreement reached between U.S. states and major tobacco companies
- MSA Kyotei, a Japanese abbreviation in reference to U.S. and Japan Mutual Defense Assistance Agreement

== Science and medicine ==
- 5-Methoxysalicylic acid, a chemical compound used as a matrix in MALDI mass spectrometry
- Mannitol salt agar, an agar used in microbiology
- Measurement system analysis, the analysis of the process of obtaining measurements
- Methanesulfonic acid, an organic sulfonic acid
- Middle Stone Age, a period of African prehistory
- Multiple sequence alignment, an alignment of three or more biological sequences
- Multiple system atrophy, a degenerative neurological disorder
- Multiscale approximation or multiresolution analysis
- Morphosyntactic alignment (linguistics)

== Technology ==
- Message submission agent, a computer program used when sending email
- Microsoft Access, a database management system
- Microsoft account, a single sign-on web service
- Mobile Service Architecture, a combination of Java ME extensions
- Multi-source agreement, an agreement between multiple manufacturers to make products which are compatible across vendors
- Measurement system analysis, in quality management a specially designed experiment that seeks to identify the components of variation in the measurement
- Microservice architecture, sometimes considered a variant of service-oriented architecture (SOA), a method of developing software applications as a suite of independently deployable, small, modular services

== Transportation ==
- WAGR Msa class, a class of steam locomotive of the Western Australian Government Railways
- Minimum safe altitude, used for safely navigating aircraft over terrain or large structures
- Motorway service area, a public rest area
- Muskrat Dam Airport, an airport at Muskrat Dam, Ontario, Canada (IATA code)

== Other uses ==
- Market Square Arena, an indoor arena in Indianapolis, Indiana, demolished in 2001
- Medical savings account, a tax-deferred deposit account for medical expenses
- Meritorious Service Award, an award of the Civil Air Patrol in the US
- Metropolitan statistical area, a geographical area defined by the US Office of Management and Budget

== See also ==
- Micropolitan statistical area, a geographical area associated with an urban area of 10,000 to 49,999 people, as defined by the US Office of Management and Budget
