= MSOA =

MSoA or MSOA may refer to:

- Microsoft Access, commonly abbreviated MSOA
- Middle Layer Super Output Area in the ONS coding system
- Bak Middle School of the Arts

== See also ==
- MSA (disambiguation)
