= Molecular mixology =

Creating cocktails using the equipment and techniques of molecular gastronomy

Molecular mixology is the process of creating cocktails using the equipment and techniques of molecular gastronomy.

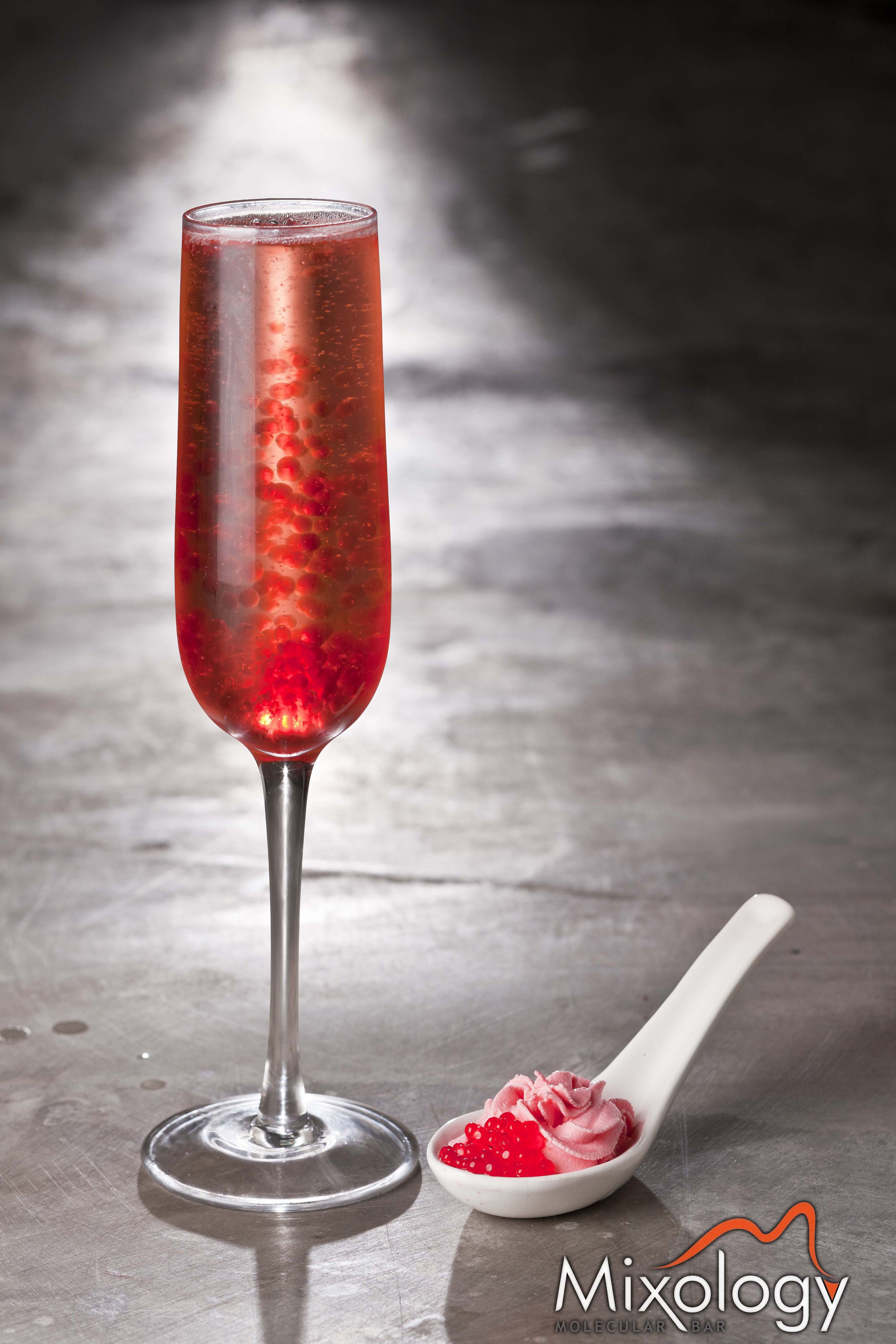
Spherification and foam techniques in a single cocktail called Sparkling Watermelon

These methods enable the creation of greater intensities and varieties of flavour, flavour combinations and different ways of presenting drinks, for example using gels, powders, foams, atomised sprays etc., as well as affecting the appearance of the cocktail

== Equipment ==
The equipment used in molecular mixology can range from comparatively simple items such as blowtorches (frequently used in restaurant cooking) to more specialised items such as a vacuum sealer, a device for combining and infusing ingredients in a vacuum and thus preserving their flavours and enhancing the finished product. These infusions allow unexpected combinations of flavours in cocktails, including flavourings from non-edible substances, such as tobacco and leather (found in the Smoked Old Fashioned cocktail) and perfume (as in the Champagne No.5). Another machine which is used by mixologists is the Rotavap. This is a vacuum rotary distillation setup, which allows the extraction of aromas, low temperature reduction of juices and the production of flavored spirits.

== Techniques ==
The techniques used by a mixologist are mostly bound to the new equipment which is provided by the molecular gastronomy. They are, for the most part, adaptations of new techniques for food preparation. Some techniques originally created for food applications can nowadays be commonly found in cocktail bars.

=== Spherification ===
Spherification, one of the techniques applied to molecular mixology, is the culinary process of shaping a liquid into spheres. They can be small like caviar or as large as an egg yolk.

=== Suspension (thickening) ===
Suspension is the technique of thickening the drink's liquid, often with Xanthan gum to allow objects, such as fruit, micro herbs and caviars to be suspended (hence the name) inside.

=== Emulsification ===
Emulsification is the technique of converting a liquid to a foam. Soy Lecithin is often used in this process along with a hand blender.
