= Note by Note =

Note by Note may refer to:

- Note by Note cuisine, a cooking style created by Hervé This
- Note by Note: The Making of Steinway L1037, a documentary film
- Note by Note (album), by Booker T. Jones (2019)
