= MSAS =

MSAS may refer to:

- Multi-functional Satellite Augmentation System
- Mansfield and Sutton Astronomical Society
- Marine Study Aquatic Society
- Mexborough and Swinton Astronomical Society
- Microsoft Analysis Services
- The Midlands Screen Acting School

== See also ==
- MSA (disambiguation)
