= Mottram =

Mottram is a surname. Notable people with the surname include:

- Buster Mottram, former British tennis player, son of Tony Mottram
- Craig Mottram, Australian distance runner
- Don Mottram, English flavour chemist
- Eric Mottram, English poet
- Heidi Mottram, British chief executive
- James Cecil Mottram (1879–1945), British cancer researcher and naturalist
- Leslie Mottram, Scottish football referee
- Linda Mottram (born 1957), former British professional tennis player, daughter of Tony Mottram
- Paul Mottram, classical and jazz composer
- R. H. Mottram, English writer
- Richard Mottram, British civil servant
- Tony Mottram (1920–2016), British tennis player

== See also ==
- Motteram, a surname
- Mottram St. Andrew, a village in Cheshire
- Mottram in Longdendale, a village in Greater Manchester
