= Mutfak Sanatlari Akademisi =

Culinary school in Istanbul, Turkey

Mutfak Sanatları Akademisi
- Industry: Culinary Arts
- Founded: 2004
- Founder: Mehmet Aksel
- Headquarters: Maslak, Istanbul, Turkiye
- Key people: Sitare Baras (Director); Cem Erol (Executive Instructor Chef)
- Website: MSA.com.tr

Mutfak Sanatları Akademisi (The Culinary Arts Academy, Turkish pronunciation: [ˈmutfak sanatɫaˈɾɯ akademiˈsi]) or shortly MSA is an international culinary school Founded 2004 in Istanbul, Turkey. It is accredited by City&Guilds and awarded by World Association of Chefs Societies for its superior quality of professional education. MSA's campus in Istanbul Maslak features professional kitchens, an amateur workshop kitchen, a bar and mixology classroom, a sommelier training facility, seminar rooms, Turkey's one and only kitchen auditorium, R&D lab and a restaurant called Okulun Mutfagi where MSA students complete their internships.

== Professional Courses ==
MSA graduates more than 750 professional chef candidates every year. Graduates are internationally certified by the City&Guilds association. MSA also offers program alternatives such as Professional Food & Beverage Management for entrepreneurs who wish to start their own food & beverage businesses. Professional courses available each term are as follows:

- Culinary Arts
- Pastry & Bakery
- Food Styling
- Chef&Owner
- Food & Beverage Management
- Bartending & Mixology

== On Campus ==
MSA campus offers options for cultural studies, monthly events and facilities for gastronomical enthusiasts.

=== Workshops and Semi-Professional Courses ===
In addition to the professional programs, MSA offers workshops and semi-professional courses designed for culinary amateurs. The semi-professional courses are named "8 Weeks in the Kitchen" and they provide training on the essentials of cooking and practicing the techniques of the professionals. The school's professional chef rooster teach the techniques and methods of culinary arts to more than 6000 kitchen enthusiasts in 200 workshops every year. Some of the popular workshop subjects cover sushis, meat cooking techniques, chocolate making, Italian cuisine and tapas.

=== Auditorium ===
The kitchen auditorium of Mutfak Sanatlari Akademisi

MSA campus houses the Electrolux Auditorium, a culinary facility. The MSA Electrolux Auditorium hosts chefs while providing a venue for new product demos and developments as well as education projects for future chefs. MSA Auditorium located at the MSA Campus, is open to all MSA students and alumni as well as to industry professionals and leaders.

=== Museum ===
MSA houses Turkey's one and only gastronomy museum on its Maslak campus. The museum features stuff related to kitchen and cooking, such as; cookery and bakery equipment, old frying-pans, oil cans; beer, raki, water and soda bottles, grocery store equipment, candy and gum packages, labels, cleaning supplies belonging to Ottoman and early-middle republican period.

=== Library ===
The MSA Library includes a number of resources about food and beverage, ranging from academical studies, to rare books. MSA Library carries approximately 4,000 publications. In addition to publications about gastronomy, the library also includes guides, periodicals, and books covering different subjects such as; business management, architecture, farming, green housing, agriculture, nutrition and health, table setting and etiquette and first aid.

=== Exclusive Training ===
Every term, MSA welcome international executive chefs from all over the world for an exclusive training to its students. Some of the chefs that have visited MSA for exclusive trainings are:

- Adam Melonas
- Alain Senderens
- Anita Lo
- Aydın Demir
- Bruno Ruffini
- Carlo Cracco
- Erez Kamarovsky
- Hiroki Takemura
- Jacob Mielcke
- Joe McCanta
- Kiyoshi Hayamizu
- Kurma Dasa
- Laurent Greco
- Mehmet Gürs
- Mickael Azouz
- Paolo Lopriore
- Ron Blaauw
- Rudolf Van Nunen
- Sergi Arola
- Tom Aikens

== Okulun Mutfağı Restaurant ==
MSA opened its training restaurant, Okulun Mutfağı (The School's Kitchen), where its culinary students work. 75 pax capacity restaurant donates all revenue to the school's Alumni association to provide financial aid for students in need. In 2011, Okulun Mutfağı was nominated for the Time Out Food-Drink Awards as the "Best New Restaurant".

== Program Associates ==
Mutfak Sanatlari Akademisi is the part of an international culinary school network, including:

- Johnson & Wales University College of Culinary Arts
- International Culinary Center New York Joint Program
- ALMA - La Scuola Internazionale di Cucina Italiana
- LeNotre, France
