= Luke Hayes-Alexander =

Canadian chef (born 1990)

- Born: 1990 (age 35–36)
- Culinary career
- Cooking style: Deconstructivist
- Current restaurant: Luke's Underground Supper Table (Toronto)
- Previous restaurant: Luke's Gastronomy (Kingston, Ontario)

Luke Hayes-Alexander (born 1990) is a Canadian chef. He was the executive chef of Luke's Gastronomy in Kingston, Ontario, and held this position from 2006 until 2012 when the family sold the restaurant.

Hayes lived in Australia for a year before moving to Toronto and founding an underground supper club in 2013, based in Kensington Market.

He is noted for his skill as a charcutier and for his historically informed command of the techniques of molecular gastronomy. His restaurant served wine from its own vineyard.

In November 2010, he addressed the first TEDxQueensU Conference at Queen's University.
