= Foam (cooking) =

Foodstuff whipped with air

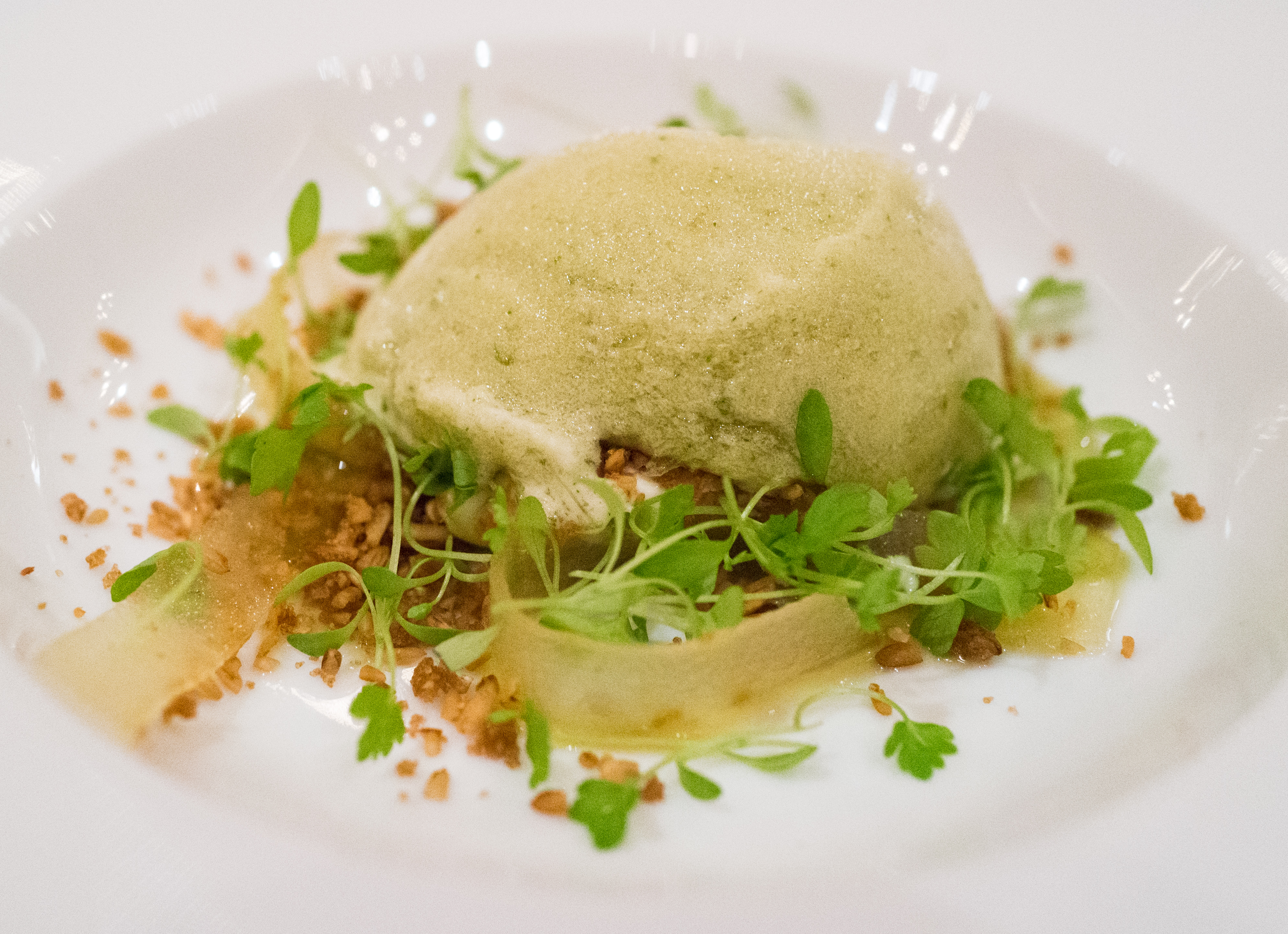
Foam Fondue with extra Foam, a dish topped with culinary foam prepared from skyr

In cuisine, foam is a gelled or stabilized liquid in which air is suspended. Foams have been present in many forms over the history of cooking, such as whipped cream, meringue and mousse. In these cases, the incorporation of air, or another gas, creates a lighter texture and a different mouthfeel. Foams add flavor without significant substance, and thus allow cooks to integrate new flavors without changing the physical composition of a dish.

More recently, foams have become a part of molecular gastronomy technique. In these cases, natural flavors (such as fruit juices, infusions of aromatic herbs, etc.) are mixed with a neutrally-flavored gelling or stabilizing agent such as agar or lecithin, and either whipped with a hand-held immersion blender or extruded through a whipped cream canister equipped with nitrous oxide cartridges. Some famous food-foams are foamed espresso, foamed mushroom, foamed beet and foamed coconut. An espuma or thermo whip is commonly used to make these foams through the making of a stock, creating a gel and extruding through the nitrous oxide canister.

== Creating culinary foam ==
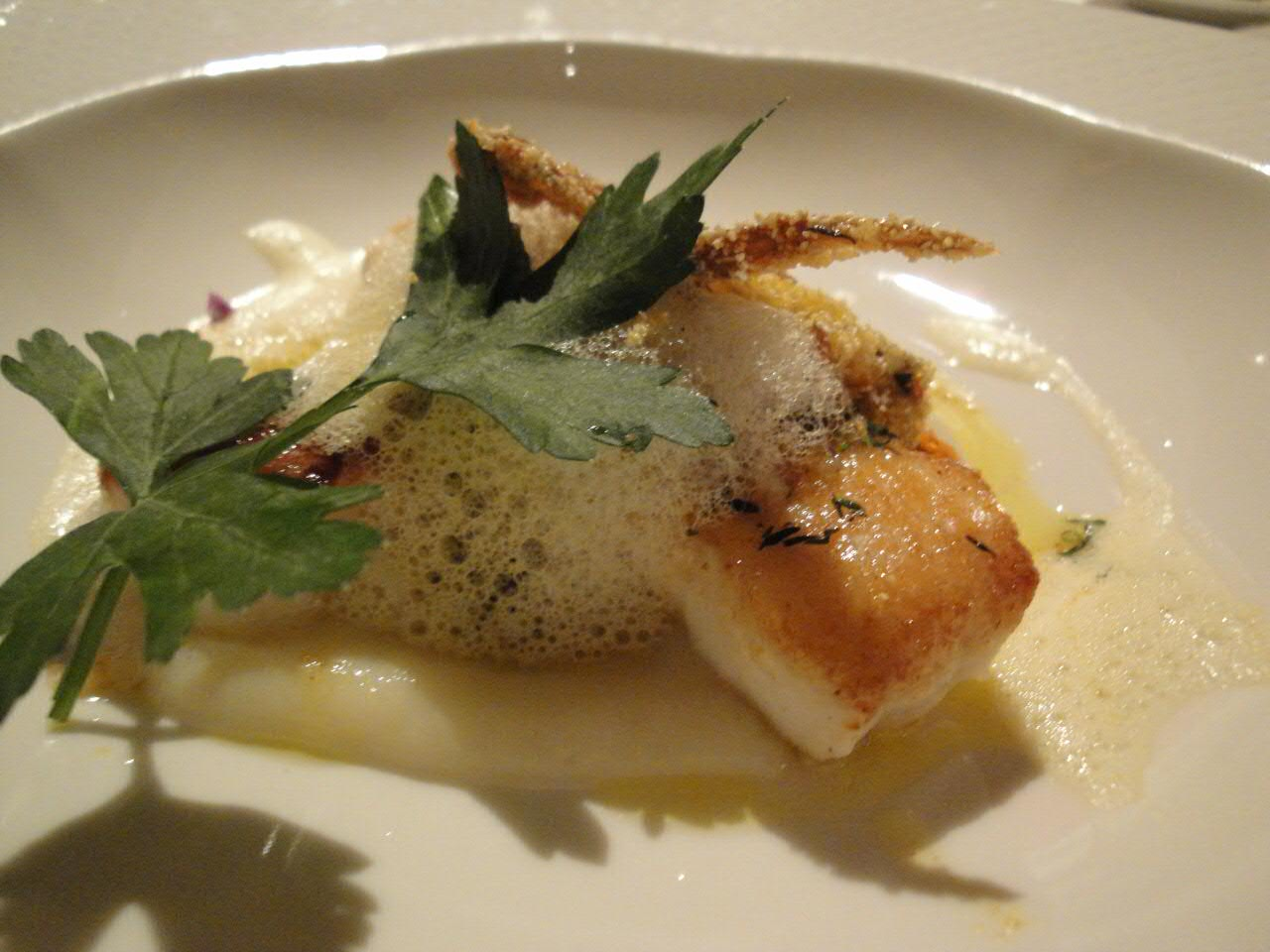
Parmesan foam on a dinner entrée

To form a stable foam and emulsion, a surfactant, such as lecithin, monoglycerides or proteins, must be present to reduce the interfacial tension between the air-oil phase and the aqueous phase. If the surfactants are at equal concentrations at the interface, proteins are generally less effective than small surfactants, such as lecithin or monoglycerides, at decreasing the interfacial tension. Of course, this is not true of heated soybean or whey protein, which readily forms copious foam.

Foams consist of two phases, an aqueous phase and a gaseous (air) phase. Foams have been used in many forms in the history of cooking, for example: whipped cream, ice cream, cakes, meringue, soufflés, mousse and marshmallow. It has a unique light texture because of the tiny air bubbles and/or a different mouthfeel. In most of these products, proteins are the main surface active agents that help in the formation and stabilization of the dispersed gas phase. To create a protein-stabilized foam, it usually involves bubbling, whipping or shaking a protein solution and its foaming properties refers to its capacity to form a thin tenacious film at the gas-liquid interface for large amounts of gas bubbles to become incorporated and stabilized. Microfoam is a particularly fine type of milk foam used in lattes and related coffee drinks.

When protein concentrations are increased to their maximum value the foaming powers and foam formation are generally increased. Often to compare foaming properties of various proteins, the foaming power at a specific protein concentration is determined.

A protein will always have certain stresses that it must overcome, such as gravitational and mechanical; it is the protein's ability to stabilize foam against these stresses that determines the foam's stability. The foam's stability is usually expressed as the time required for 50% of the liquid to drain from foam (a 50% reduction in foam volume).
