= Hervé This =

French physical chemist (born 1955)

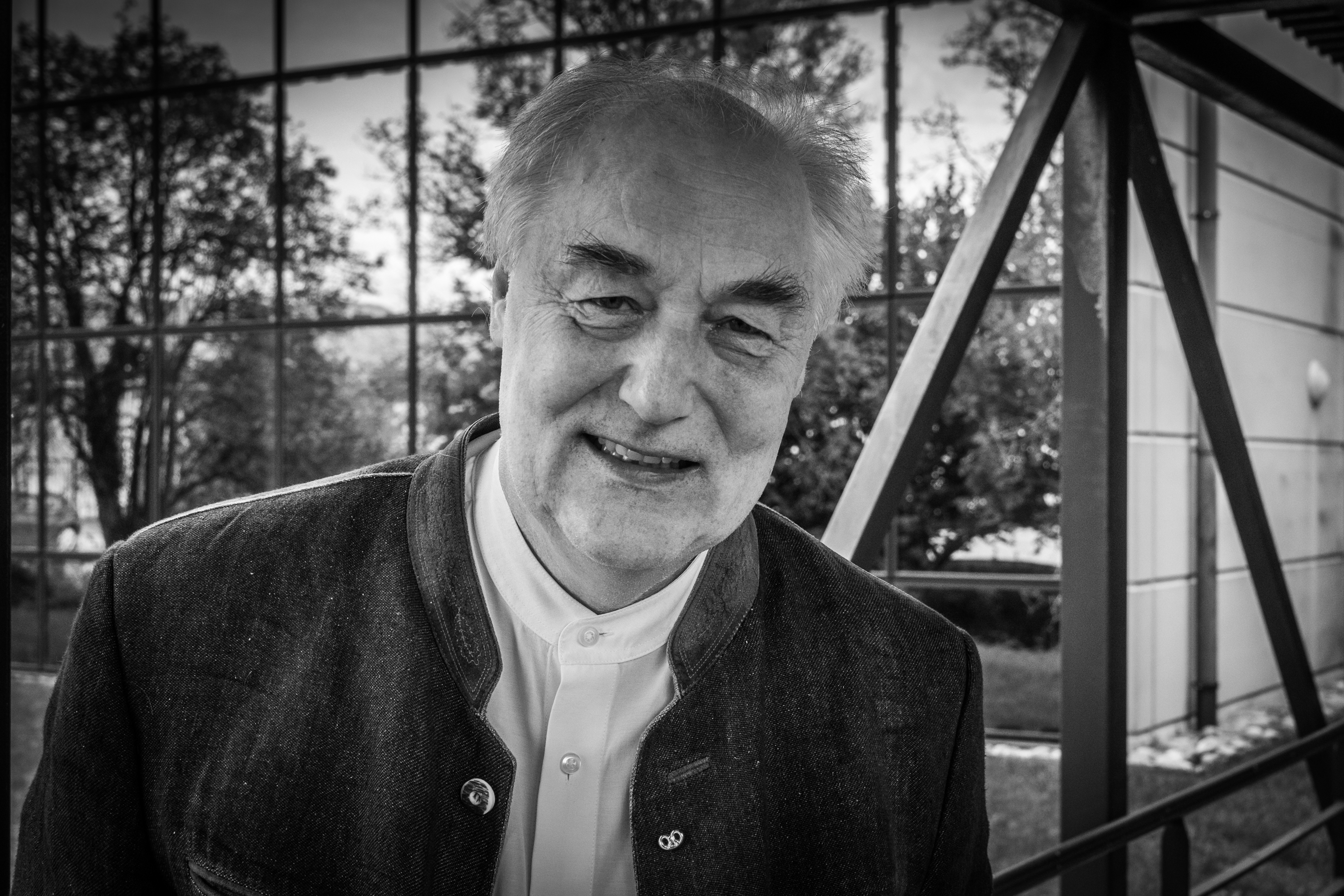
- The chemist Hervé This
- Born: 5 June 1955 (age 71); Suresnes, Hauts-de-Seine, France
- Known for: Molecular and physical gastronomy
- Scientific career
- Fields: Chemistry
- Workplaces: Institut National de la Recherche Agronomique

Hervé This (French: [ɛʁve tis]; born 5 June 1955), sometimes named Hervé This-Benckhard or Herve This vo Kientza, is a French physical chemist who works for the Institut National de la Recherche Agronomique (Inrae) at AgroParisTech, in Paris, France. His main area of scientific research is molecular and physical gastronomy, that is the science that explores the mechanisms of culinary transformations.

== Career ==
With the late Nicholas Kurti, he coined the scientific term "Molecular and Physical Gastronomy" in 1988, which he sometimes shortened to "Molecular Gastronomy" after Kurti's death in 1998, for focusing on the more chemical aspects of the discipline.

After graduating from ESPCI Paris, he was invited by Guy Ourisson to get a PhD from Pierre and Marie Curie University, under the title La gastronomie moléculaire et physique. The jury of included Jean-Marie Lehn, Pierre-Gilles de Gennes, Pierre Potier (who accepted in the last minute to be administratively the PhD director, as it is not allowed in France to be his own PhD director).

He has written many scientific publications, as well as several books on the subject, some of which can be understood even by those who have little or no knowledge of chemistry, but so far only four have been translated into English.

He also collaborates with the magazine Pour la Science (the French edition of Scientific American), the aim of which is to present scientific concepts to the general public.

Member of the Académie d'agriculture de France since 2010, he was the president of the Section "Human Food" for 9 years. In 2004, he was invited by the French Academy of sciences to create the "Food Science & Culture" Foundation, of which he was appointed the Scientific Director.

That same year, he was asked to create the Institute for Advanced Studies of Taste ("Hautes Études du Goût") with the University of Reims Champagne Ardenne, of which he is the president of the Educational Program.

In 2011, he was appointed as a consulting professor of AgroParisTech, and he was also asked to create courses on science and technology at Sciences Po Paris. On 3 June 2014, he was asked to create the "International Center for Molecular Gastronomy AgroParisTech-Inrae", to which he was appointed director. That same day, he announced the creation of the International Journal of Molecular Gastronomy.

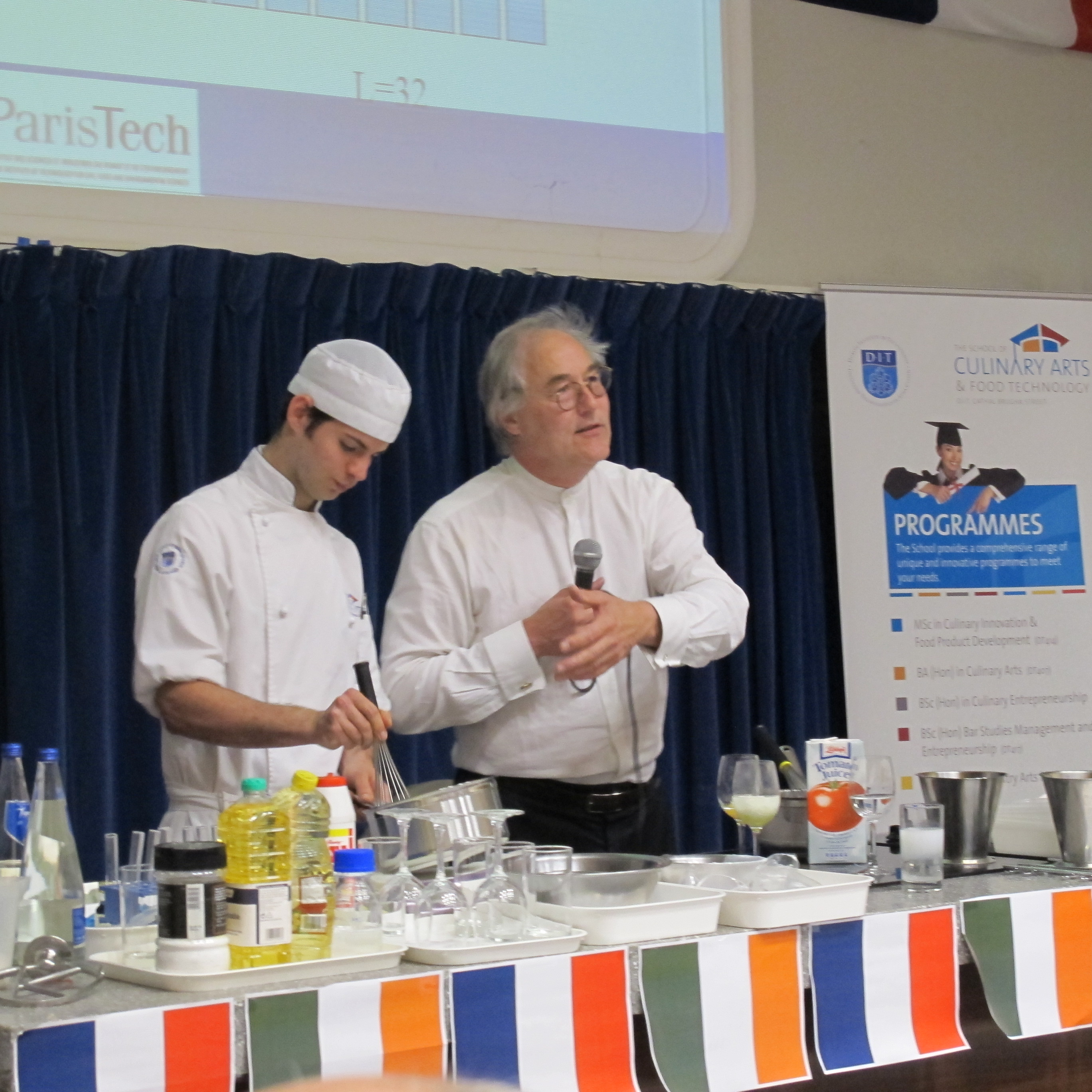
Hervé This at Dublin Institute of Technology, Cathal Brugha Street, 2011 with student Ciarán Elliott demonstrating how to achieve a greater volume when whipping egg whites.

Some of his discoveries or inventions include "uncooking eggs", a "dispersed system formalism" (DSF, which was recently changed into NDSF), "dynagels", in situ quantitative nuclear magnetic, resonance spectrometry, "Chocolate Chantilly", a foam made of chocolate without eggs (and also cheese Chantilly, butter Chantilly, foie gras Chantilly...), new ways of cooking eggs, which he called "eggs at 6X°C" (around 65 °C, the white begins coagulating, but not the yolk), and more generally a large number of colloidal systems. He also found that beating an egg white after adding a small amount of cold water considerably increases the amount of foam produced. Every month he adds one new "invention" in the Art et Science section of the website of the chef Pierre Gagnaire.

Although his main focus is on physical chemistry, he also attributes great importance to the emotional aspect of cooking, as the title of one of his books shows: Cooking is love, art, technique.

Aside his scientific work, the latest "political" work by Hervé This has been the invention (in 1994) and the promotion of synthetic cooking, a technique that generates a culinary style called Note by Note cuisine – the next stage in the application of science to the kitchen after molecular cooking (i.e. a technical way of producing food using equipments imported from laboratories). Synthetic cooking involves taking the compounds that compose ingredients used in cooking, and using these as the raw ingredients for making dishes. "If you use pure compounds, you open up billions and billions of new possibilities," Mr This said. "It's like a painter using primary colors or a musician composing note by note."

As part of the 2011 International Year of Chemistry, The French Embassy in Ireland in association with the Institut Français, the Alliance Française Dublin, the Lycée Français d’Irlande and the French Trade Commission UBIFRANCE put on a number of lectures around Dublin, Ireland where Hervé This performed demonstrations and promoted the new concept of 'note by note' cuisine.

For his work, he got many national or international distinctions (see below). For example, in 2025, he was awarded the world famous Sonning Prize, being the first chemist to get it, and the third scientist, after Bertrand Russell and Niels Bohr.. In 2026, he was awarded the Chemistry Medal from the French Academy of Sciences.

== Bibliography ==
- 1993 : Les Secrets de la casserole, Éditions Belin, Paris, France
- 1995 : Révélations gastronomiques, Éditions Belin. ISBN 2-7011-1756-9
- 1997 : La Casserole des enfants, Éditions Belin, Paris, France
- 2002 : Traité élémentaire de cuisine, Éditions Belin, Paris, France
- 2002 : Casseroles et éprouvettes, Éditions Belin, Paris, France
- 2005 : Molecular Gastronomy: Exploring the Science of Flavor (translator: Malcolm DeBevoise), Cambridge University Press. ISBN 0-231-13312-X
- 2006 : La cuisine c'est de l'amour, de l'art, de la technique, Odile Jacob, Paris, France
- 2007 : Construisons un repas, Odile Jacob, Paris, France
- 2007 : De la science aux fourneaux, Pour la Science/Editions Belin
- 2007 : Kitchen Mysteries: Revealing the Science of Cooking (translator: Jody Glading), Columbia University Press. ISBN 978-0-231-14170-3 or 023114170X
- 2007 : Alchimistes aux fourneaux, Flammarion, Paris, France
- 2009: Building a Meal: From Molecular Gastronomy to Culinary Constructivism (Arts and Traditions of the Table: Perspectives on Culinary History) (translator: Malcolm DeBevoise), Columbia University Press. ISBN 978-0-231-14466-7
- 2009: Cours de gastronomie moléculaire n°1 : Science, technologie, technique (culinaires) : quelles relations?, Quae/Belin, Paris, France.
- 2011: Cours de gastronomie moléculaire n°2 : Les Précisions culinaires, Quae/Belin, Paris.
- 2012: La cuisine note à note en douze questions souriantes, Belin, , Paris, France.
- 2014 : Note by Note Cooking, Columbia University Press, New York, US.
- 2014: Mon histoire de cuisine, Belin, Paris, France.
- 2017: Le terroir à toutes les sauces, Éditions de la Nuée bleue, Strasbourg, France.
- 2021: Handbook of Molecular Gastronomy, CRC Press, Boca Raton, FL, USA
- 2022: Calculating and problem solving through culinary demonstrations, CRC Press, Boca Raton, FL, USA
- 2026: Inventions culinaires/gastronomie moléculaire, Odile Jacob, Paris, France

== Orders and Decorations ==
Knight of the Legion of Honour.

Commander of the Order of Agricultural Merit.

Officer of the Order of Arts and Letters.

Officer of the Order of Academic Palms.

== Affiliations with Learned Societies ==
Appointed member of the French Association for the Advancement of Science (December 1997).

Member of the French Chemical Society (since February 12, 1998).

Elected national corresponding member of the Académie de Stanislas (December 4, 2006).

Elected national corresponding member in the Food Supply Chains section of the French Academy of Agriculture (December 16, 2006).

Elected associate member of the Royal Academy of Science, Letters and Fine Arts of Belgium (May 2009).

Elected member of the French Academy of Agriculture (October 2010).

Elected corresponding member of the Academy of Sciences, Letters and Arts of Alsace (January 2018).

== Academic Distinctions ==
D'Alembert Prize from the French Mathematical Society (1985).

Medal from the Association of Members of the Order of Academic Palms (2008).

Doctor honoris causa from the Institut de tourisme et d'hôtellerie du Québec (November 2003).

Francqui Prize (Belgian national category), University of Liège, Gembloux AgroBioTech/Francqui Foundation.

Doctor Honoris Causa, University of Cluj-Napoca (Romania)

Sonning Prize 2025

Quercus Prize (1st Confluence Prize) from the Institute for Life, Food and Environmental Sciences (AgroParisTech).

Chemistry Medal from the French Academy of Sciences.

== Literary Awards ==
Grand Prize for Gastronomic Literature (special category) at the International Festival of Culinary Books (*Salon international du livre gourmand*) for *Casseroles et éprouvettes* (November 20, 2002).

Special Jury Award at the Gourmand World Cookbook Awards for *La cuisine, c'est de l'amour, de l'art, de la technique* ("Cooking is Love, Art, and Technique"), co-authored with Pierre Gagnaire (December 23, 2006).

== Television Awards ==
Imagina Award for Best Digital Synthetic Image Production for *Archimède* (February 2000).
