= Motteram =

Motteram is a surname. Notable people with the surname include:

- Carl Motteram (born 1984), English footballer
- Cecil Augustus Motteram (1853–1943), Australian baker, founder of Motteram & Sons (later merged with Arnott's Biscuits)
- Henry Motteram, co-creator of the 2010–2011 Australian TV series My Sri Lanka with Peter Kuruvita

== See also ==
- Mottram
