= Note by Note cuisine =

Style of cooking created by Hervé This

Note by Note cuisine is a style of cooking based on molecular gastronomy, created by French chemist Hervé This. Dishes are made using pure compounds instead of using animal or plant tissues. This said the cuisine is like "a painter using primary colours, or a musician composing electroacoustic music, wave by wave, using a computer".

== History ==
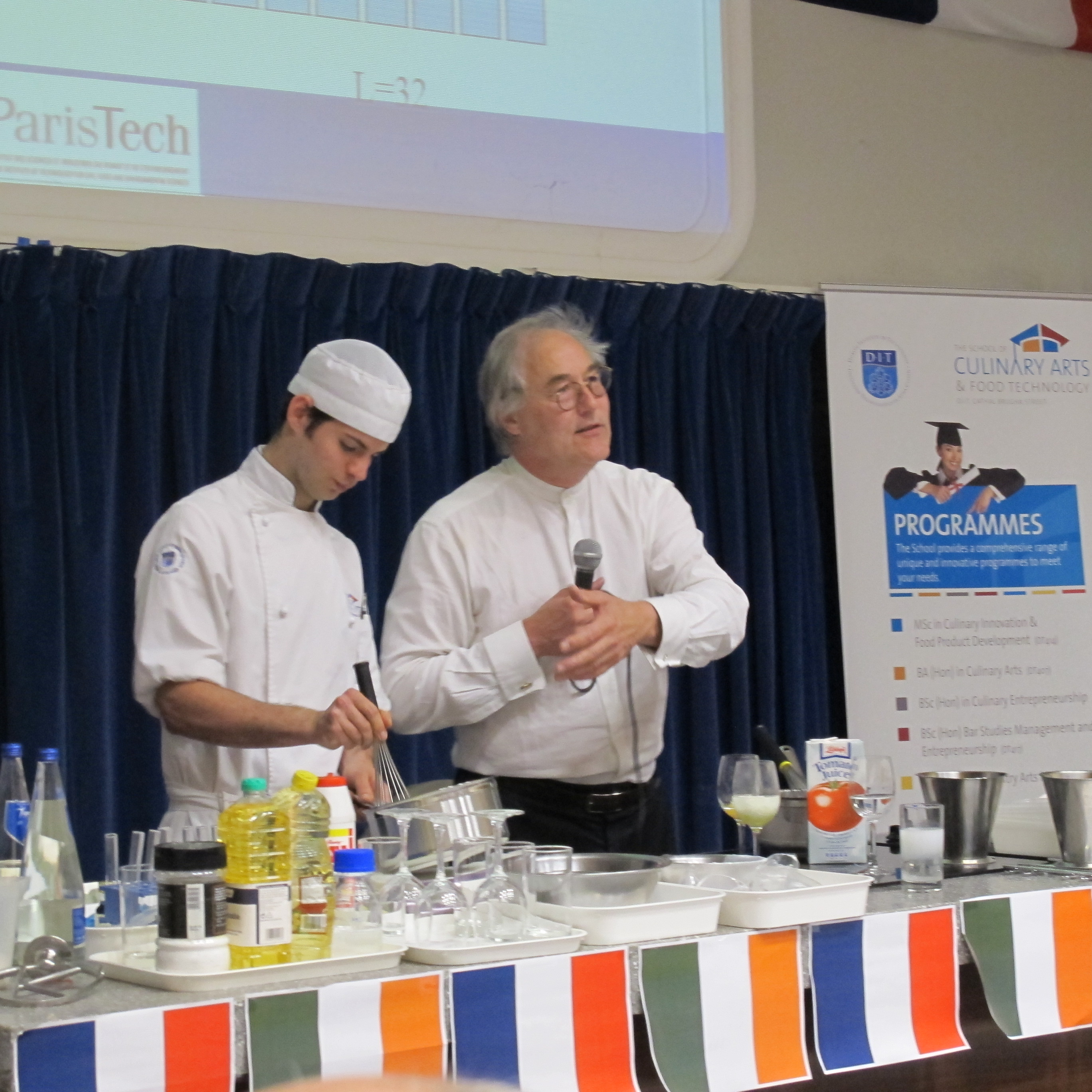
Hervé This (right) in 2011

According to Hervé This, Note by Note cuisine began in 1994 and granted the style its name in 1997. This hoped for a future in which recipes gave advice such as "add to your bouillon two drops of a 0.001 percent solution of benzylmercaptan in pure alcohol". He struggled in his attempts to promote the cuisine, and did not receive pay from it until 1999.

After 2006, he convinced French chef Pierre Gagnaire to develop Note by Note; approximately one year later, Gagnaire served the first Note by Note dish in a restaurant. On 26 April 2008, they presented the first Note by Note dish ("Note à note N°1") in Hong Kong. After more work, Gagnaire named the second Note by Note dish "Chick Corea" after the jazz pianist of the same name.

== Preparation ==
Ingredients used in Note by Note cuisine are called compounds, which include water, ethanol, sucrose, protein, amino acids and lipids. For example, in the "wölher sauce" made by Note by Note cuisine, the following might be added: water, anthocyanins (for colour), sugars, ethanol, amino acids (for flavour), glycerol, phenols, quinones, and organic acids.
