= Adam Melonas =

Australian chef of Greek heritage (born 1981)

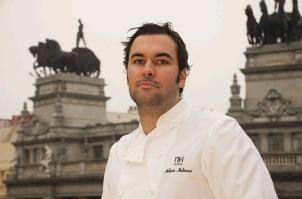
- Melonas in Madrid
- Born: 10 November 1981 (age 44); Canberra, Australia
- Education: Melba High Technology School (1993–1996) Hyatt Hotel Working Apprentice (1996–1999) Progressive Cuisine (Self Taught)
- Culinary career
- Cooking style: Molecular gastronomy
- Current restaurant
- La Terraza del Casino - Casino De Madrid (2007–2009) Sensory Dining Project in Midtown Manhattan (April 2010)

Adam Melonas (born 10 November 1981 in Canberra, Australia) is an Australian chef of Greek heritage. He currently is the founder and CEO of Chew LLC - a food innovation lab in Cambridge, Massachusetts.

== See also ==
- Nouvelle cuisine
