= Ammonium lactate =

Pair of enantiomers

- Structural formulae of the constituent ions

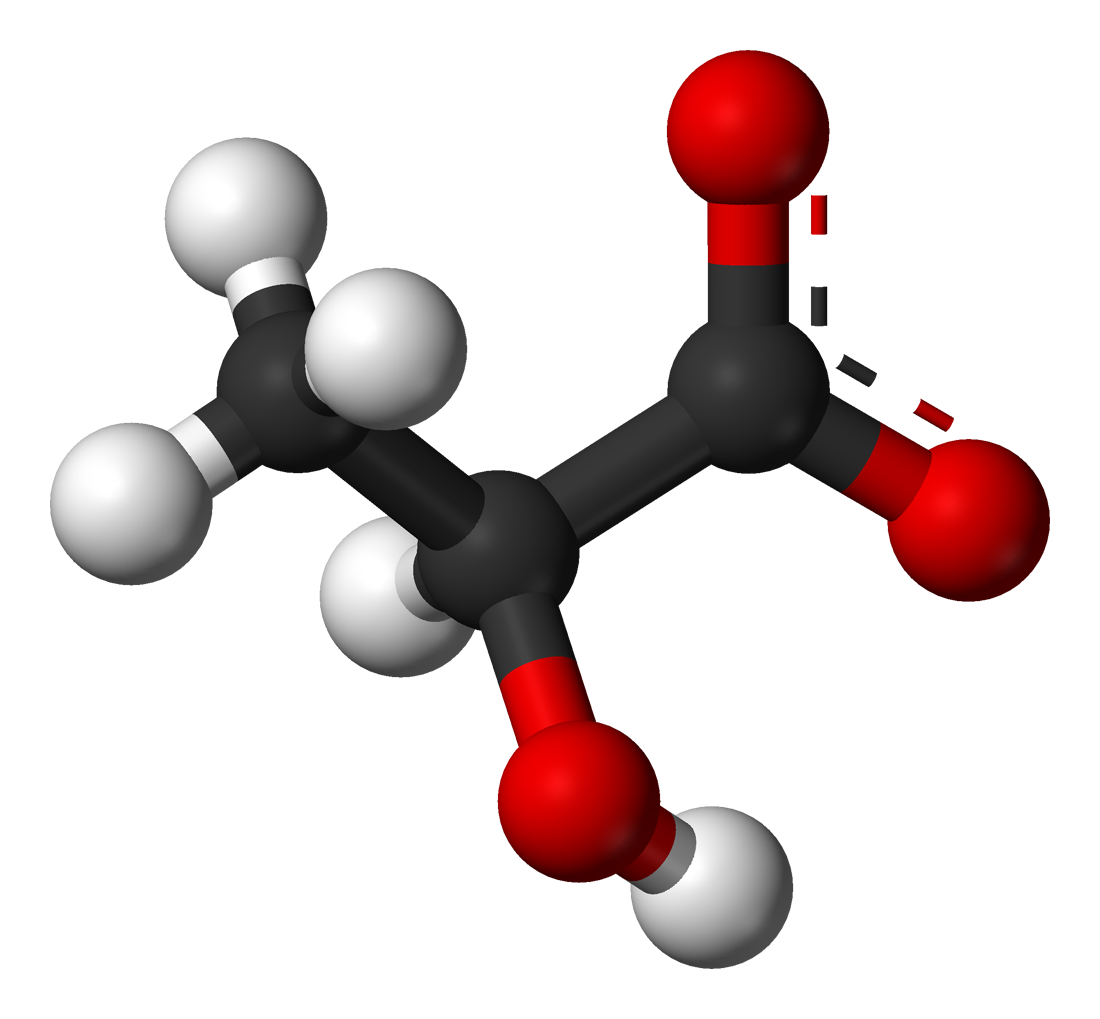
Ball-and-stick model of the lactate anion
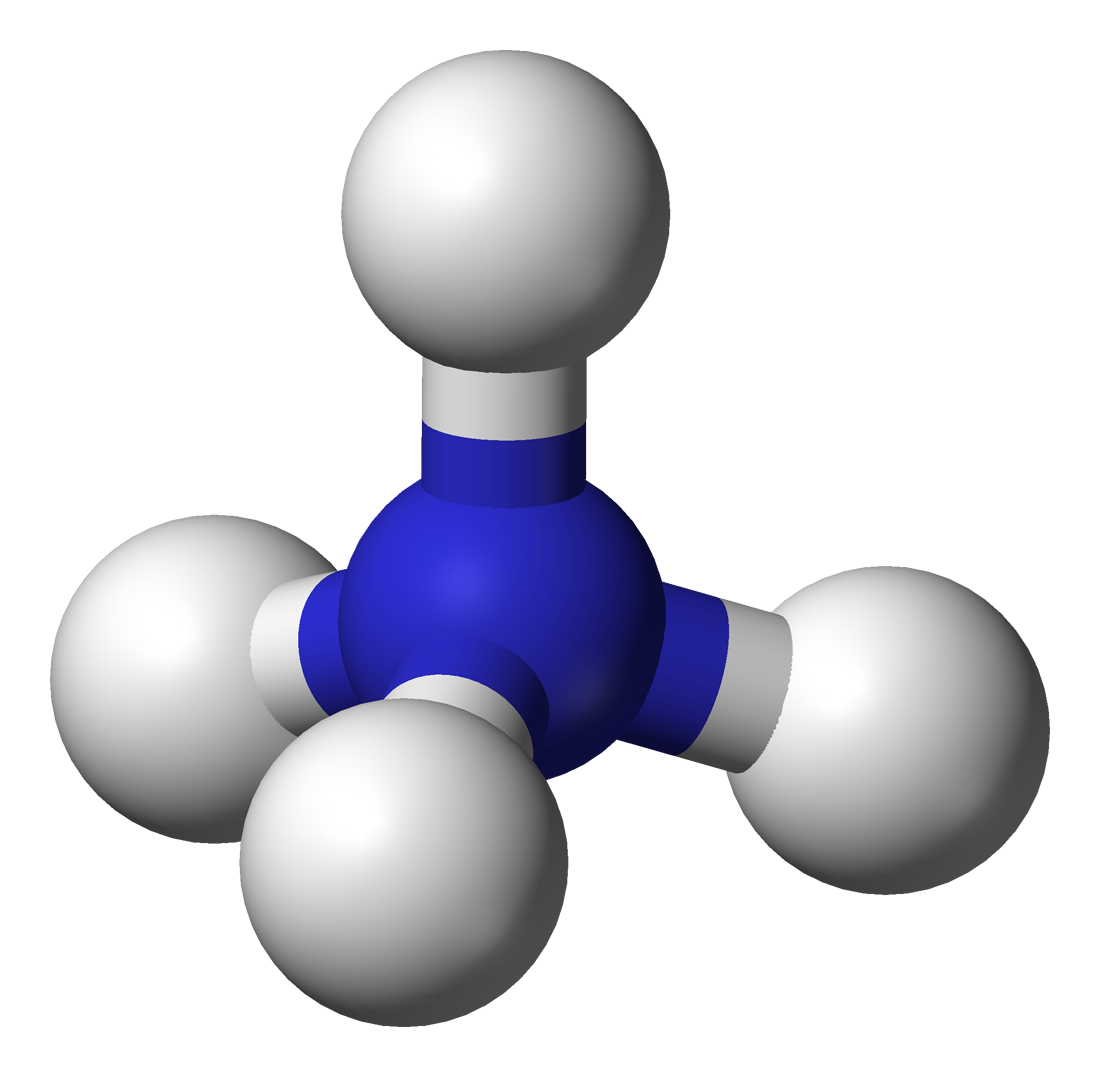
Ball-and-stick model of the ammonium cation

Names
- IUPAC name azanium 2-hydroxypropanoate
- Other names Ammonium lactate Lac-hydrin

Identifiers
CAS Number	515-98-0
3D model (JSmol)	Interactive image
ChEMBL	ChEMBL1200747
ChemSpider	56149
ECHA InfoCard	100.007.469
E number	E328 (antioxidants, ...)
PubChem CID	10129918
UNII	67M901L9NQ
CompTox Dashboard (EPA)	DTXSID3052808
- InChI: InChI=1S/C3H6O3.H3N/c1-2(4)3(5)6;/h2,4H,1H3,(H,5,6);1H3 Key: RZOBLYBZQXQGFY-UHFFFAOYSA-N; InChI=1/C3H6O3.H3N/c1-2(4)3(5)6;/h2,4H,1H3,(H,5,6);1H3 Key: RZOBLYBZQXQGFY-UHFFFAOYAD
- SMILES: CC(C(=O)[O-])O.[NH4+]

Properties
Chemical formula	C_{3}H_{9}O_{3}N
Molar mass	107.06 g/mol

Pharmacology
ATCvet code	QA16QA04 (WHO)
- Except where otherwise noted, data are given for materials in their standard state (at 25 °C [77 °F], 100 kPa). verify (what is ?) Infobox references

Ammonium lactate is a compound with formula NH_{4}(C_{2}H_{4}(OH)COO). It is the ammonium salt of lactic acid. It has mild anti-bacterial properties.

It has E number "E328" and is the active ingredient of the skin lotions Amlactin and Lac-Hydrin.

Ammonium lactate is the chemical combination of lactic acid and ammonium hydroxide. It is used as a skin moisturizer lotion to treat dry, scaly, itchy skin. Those who are using it should avoid exposure to sunlight or artificial UV rays, such as sunlamps or tanning beds. Ammonium lactate makes skin more sensitive to sunlight, and skin is more likely to sunburn.

Ammonium lactate is sold as an over-the-counter medication Amlactin brand used for treating xerosis and keratosis pilaris.
