= Spherification =

Cooking method to convert a liquid into edible, gelatinous balls

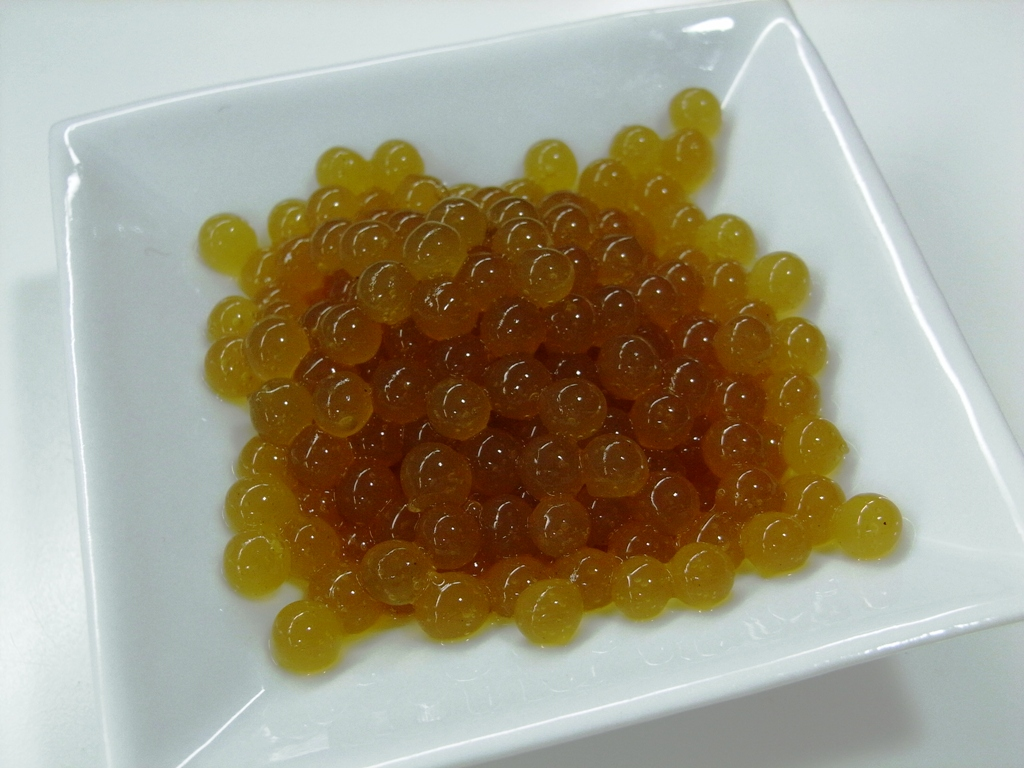
Spherification of tea

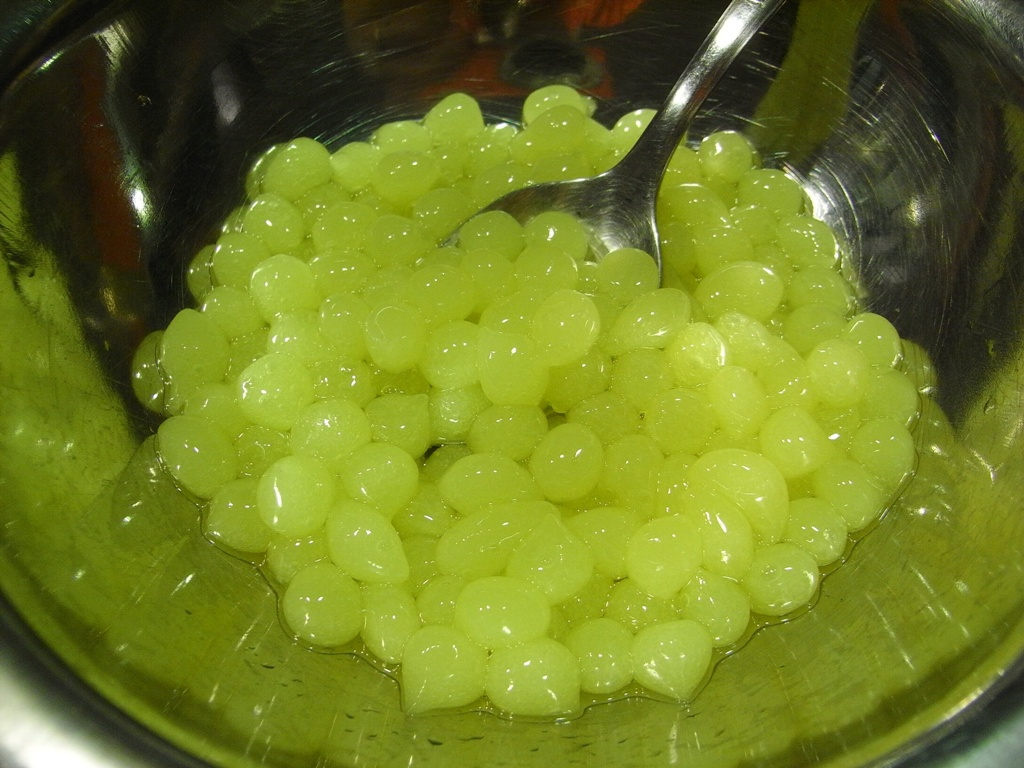
Spherification of apple juice

Spherification is a culinary process that employs sodium alginate and either calcium chloride or calcium gluconate lactate to shape a liquid into squishy spheres which visually and texturally resemble roe. The technique was documented by Unilever in the 1950s and brought to the modernist cuisine by the creative team at El Bulli under the direction of chefs Ferran Adrià and Albert Adrià.

== Preparation ==
There are two main methods for creating such spheres, which differ based on the calcium content of the liquid product to be spherified.

=== Basic spherification ===
For flavored liquids (such as fruit juices) containing no calcium, the liquid is thoroughly mixed with a small quantity of powdered sodium alginate, then dripped into a bowl filled with a cold solution of calcium chloride, or other soluble calcium salt.

Similarly to how water dropped into a quantity of oil forms a bubble of water in the oil, each drop of the alginated liquid tends to form into a small sphere in the calcium solution. During a reaction time of a few seconds to a few minutes, the calcium solution causes the outer layer of each alginated liquid sphere to form a thin, flexible skin. The resulting "popping boba" or artificial "caviar" balls are rinsed then in water and saved for later use in food or beverages.

=== Reverse spherification ===
Reverse spherification, for use with substances that contain calcium (e.g. milk) or have high acid/alcohol content, requires dripping the substance (containing calcium lactate or calcium lactate gluconate) into a bath of alginate and distilled water.

A more recent technique is frozen reverse spherification, which involves pre-freezing spheres containing calcium lactate gluconate and then submerging them in the sodium alginate bath.

Basic and reverse spherification methods give much the same result: a sphere of liquid held by a thin gel membrane, texturally similar to roe. However, with the basic method the membrane will continue to thicken until eventually the whole ball is jelly, and so should be used immediately. The reverse spherification method gives far more stable results and can be stored for many hours.

== See also ==
- Bubble tea
- Edible water bottle
- Liquid marbles
- Molecular gastronomy
