= Myanmar Space Agency =

Government agency of Myanmar

- မြန်မာအာကာသအေဂျင်စီ

Agency overview
- Formed: 1 June 2025
- Jurisdiction: Government of Myanmar
- Headquarters: Naypyidaw, Myanmar
- Agency executive: Soe Myint Maung, Chief Executive Officer (Union Minister Level)

The Myanmar Space Agency (Burmese: မြန်မာအာကာသအေဂျင်စီ, abbreviated MSA) is a national-level space agency of Myanmar, formed on 1 June 2025. The agency was placed under the control of Myanmar leader Min Aung Hlaing and was presented as being aimed—under the label of "peaceful purposes"—at internationally collaborative space projects linked to national security.

== History ==
Since 2017, a steering committee was formed under the NLD government led by Aung San Suu Kyi to develop plans for Myanmar's own satellite system. The committee was chaired by then-Vice President Myint Swe.

On 20 February 2021, the Myanmar Aerospace Engineering University launched Myanmar's first satellite programme as a government-funded joint project with Hokkaido University. The satellite was later held by the Japanese university over concerns that the military might use it for its operations following the 2021 Myanmar protests.

During his visit to Russia in March 2022, Min Aung Hlaing visited a cosmodrome and held discussions related to space technology. Russian President Vladimir Putin later stated that a satellite data research centre would be established in Myanmar with Russian assistance. In 2024, a new committee was formed to oversee satellite development, headed by Mya Tun Oo, replacing the earlier NLD-era body.

== Formation ==
The Myanmar Space Agency was officially established on 1 June 2025, as announced in the 4 July edition of the Myanmar Gazette. It was placed under the direct supervision of Min Aung Hlaing, who was granted authority to approve expert appointments within the agency. The government stated that the agency's objectives were peaceful in nature, focusing on international cooperation related to national security, including environmental conservation, disaster management, and agriculture, and assigned it 20 key responsibilities related to satellite services.

Following its formation, Min Aung Hlaing made a three-day visit to Russia in September 2025, during which he met with the Director-General of Roscosmos to discuss future space cooperation. Agreements were signed between the Myanmar Space Agency and Roscosmos leadership.

== Public engagement ==
The Space Museum was opened by Min Aung Hlaing at the People's Park in Yangon on 30 November 2025. It was renovated from an earlier museum that had been jointly established by the Burmese and Japanese governments in 1987.

== See also ==
- MMSAT-1
- List of government space agencies
