= Calcium lactate gluconate =

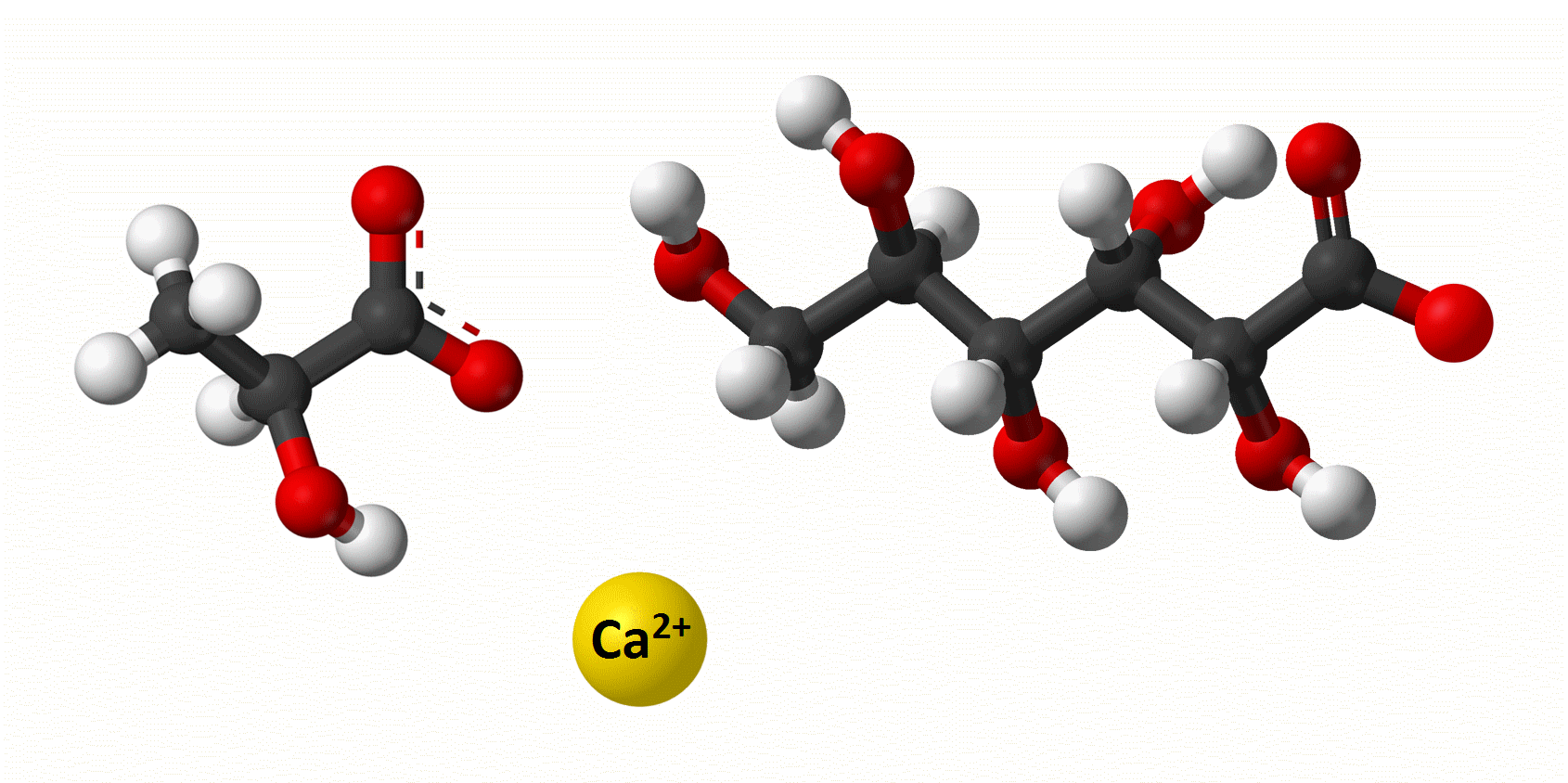

Names
- IUPAC name calcium; (R/S)-2-hydroxypropanoate; (2R,3S,4R,5R)-2,3,4,5,6-pentahydroxyhexanoate

Identifiers
CAS Number	11116-97-5
3D model (JSmol)	Interactive image
ChemSpider	83274
ECHA InfoCard	100.031.223
PubChem CID	92237
UNII	472LWJ3Y9N
CompTox Dashboard (EPA)	DTXSID60894841
- InChI: InChI=1S/C6H12O7.C3H6O3.Ca/c7-1-2(8)3(9)4(10)5(11)6(12)13;1-2(4)3(5)6;/h2-5,7-11H,1H2,(H,12,13);2,4H,1H3,(H,5,6);/q;;+2/p-2/t2-,3-,4+,5-;;/m1../s1 Key: PWKNEBQRTUXXLT-ZBHRUSISSA-L; InChI=1/C6H12O7.C3H6O3.Ca/c7-1-2(8)3(9)4(10)5(11)6(12)13;1-2(4)3(5)6;/h2-5,7-11H,1H2,(H,12,13);2,4H,1H3,(H,5,6);/q;;+2/p-2/t2-,3-,4+,5-;;/m1../s1 Key: PWKNEBQRTUXXLT-DAEZFGRIBL
- SMILES: [Ca+2].[O-]C(=O)C(O)C.[O-]C(=O)[C@H](O)[C@@H](O)[C@H](O)[C@H](O)CO

Properties
Chemical formula	C_{9}H_{16}CaO_{10}
Molar mass	324.295 g·mol^{−1}
Appearance	white, taste- and odourless, crystalline solid
Solubility in water	400 g/L

Pharmacology
ATC code	A12AA06 (WHO)
- Except where otherwise noted, data are given for materials in their standard state (at 25 °C [77 °F], 100 kPa). verify (what is ?) Infobox references

Calcium lactate gluconate, also known as GLOCAL, is a soluble salt of calcium, lactic acid and gluconic acid used in effervescent calcium tablets. Its chemical formula is Ca_{5}(C_{3}H_{5}O_{3})_{6}·(C_{6}H_{11}O_{7})_{4}·2H_{2}O. It was first developed by Sandoz, Switzerland. Calcium lactate gluconate is used in the functional and fortified food industry due to its good solubility and neutral taste. In addition, it is used in various spherification techniques in molecular gastronomy. It can also be used to help neutralize HF (hydrofluoric acid) poisoning.
