= Maine Snowmobile Association =

The Maine Snowmobile Association (MSA) is a liaison between local snowmobile clubs, local municipalities, supporting businesses and the landowners throughout the state of Maine who allow access to sledders. It does not provide funding or perform any trail maintenance, but is instead a lobbying organization that has a goal of promoting the sport of snowmobiling within the state. There are over 14,000 miles of groomed and marked snowmobile trails in the state of Maine. Approximately 4,000 miles of the trail system in Maine is called the Interconnected Trails System (ITS). ITS trails are marked red, and connector trails are marked green. Green boxed markings represent junctions denoted by the first and last letter of the county in which the junction is located, and the number assigned to that junction.
