= Molecular gastronomy =

Scientific study of cuisine

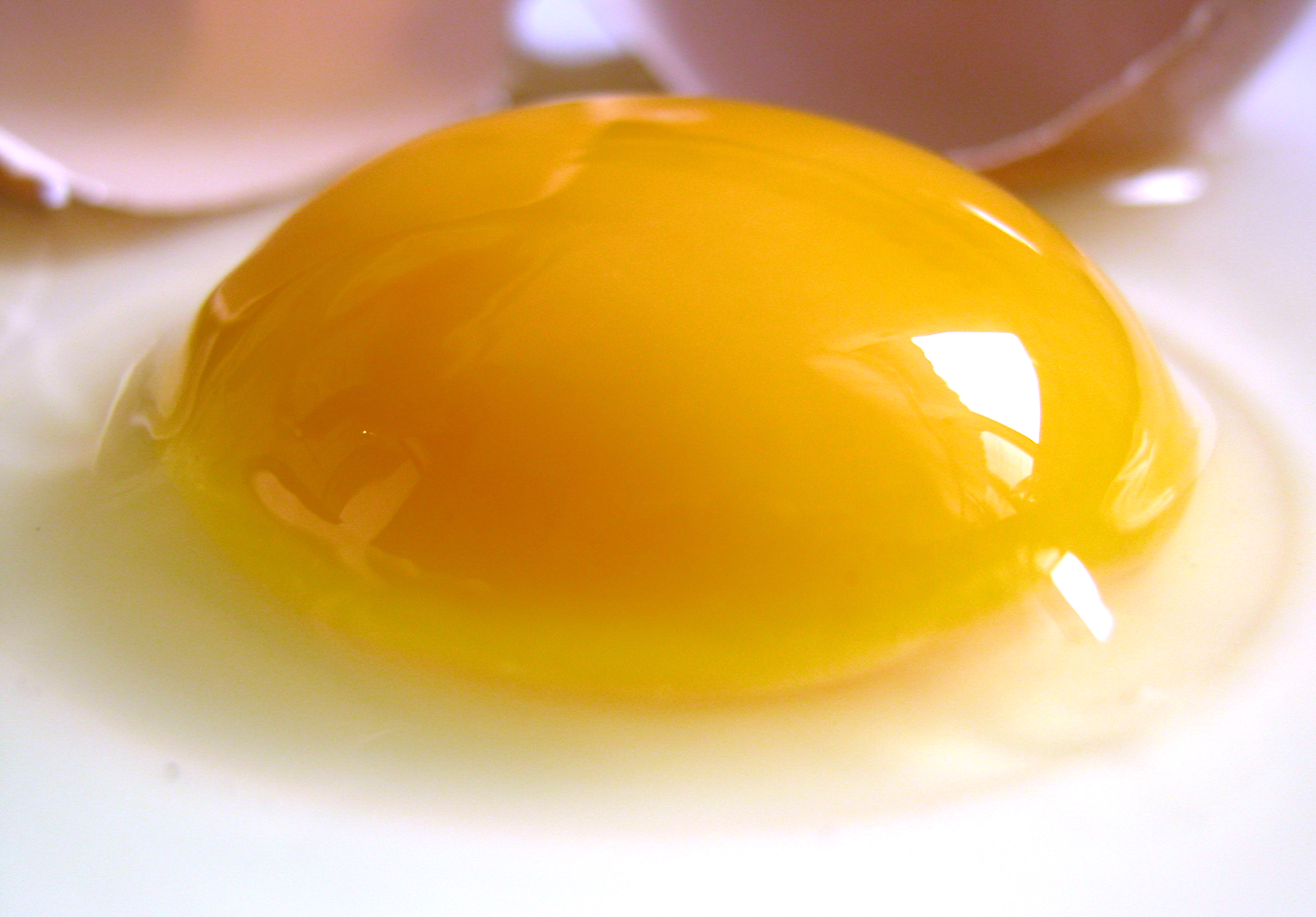
Molecular gastronomy includes the study of how different cooking temperatures affect eggs, their viscosity, surface tension, and different ways of introducing air into them.

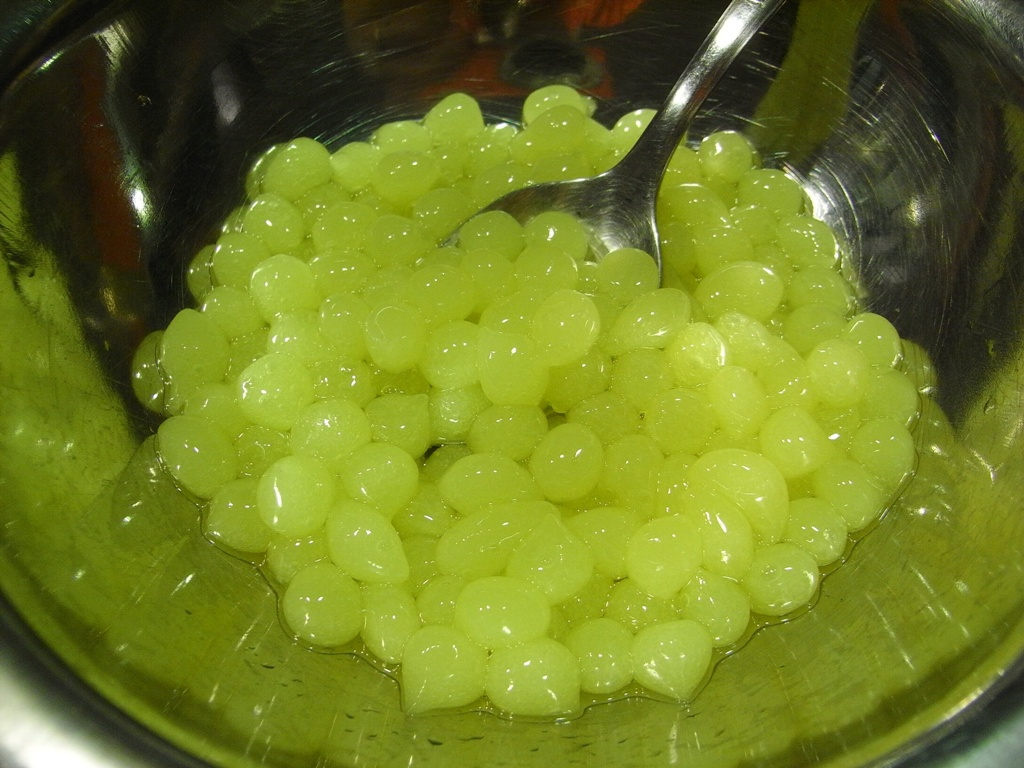
Spherification of juices and other liquids is a technique of molecular gastronomy.

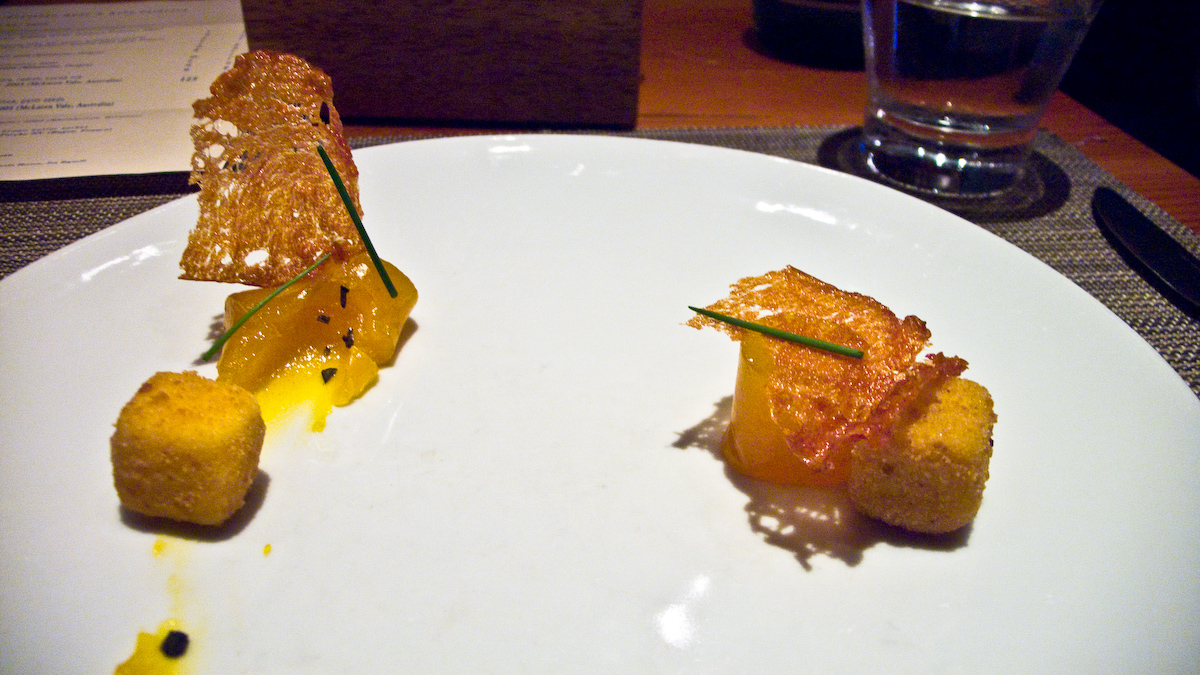
A molecular gastronomy rendition of eggs Benedict served by wd~50 in New York City. The cubes are deep-fried Hollandaise sauce.

Molecular gastronomy is the scientific approach of cuisine from primarily the perspective of chemistry. The composition (molecular structure), properties (mass, viscosity, etc) and transformations (chemical reactions, reactant products) of an ingredient are addressed and used in the preparation and appreciation of the ingested products. It is a branch of food science that approaches the preparation and enjoyment of nutrition from the perspective of a scientist at the scale of atoms, molecules, and mixtures.

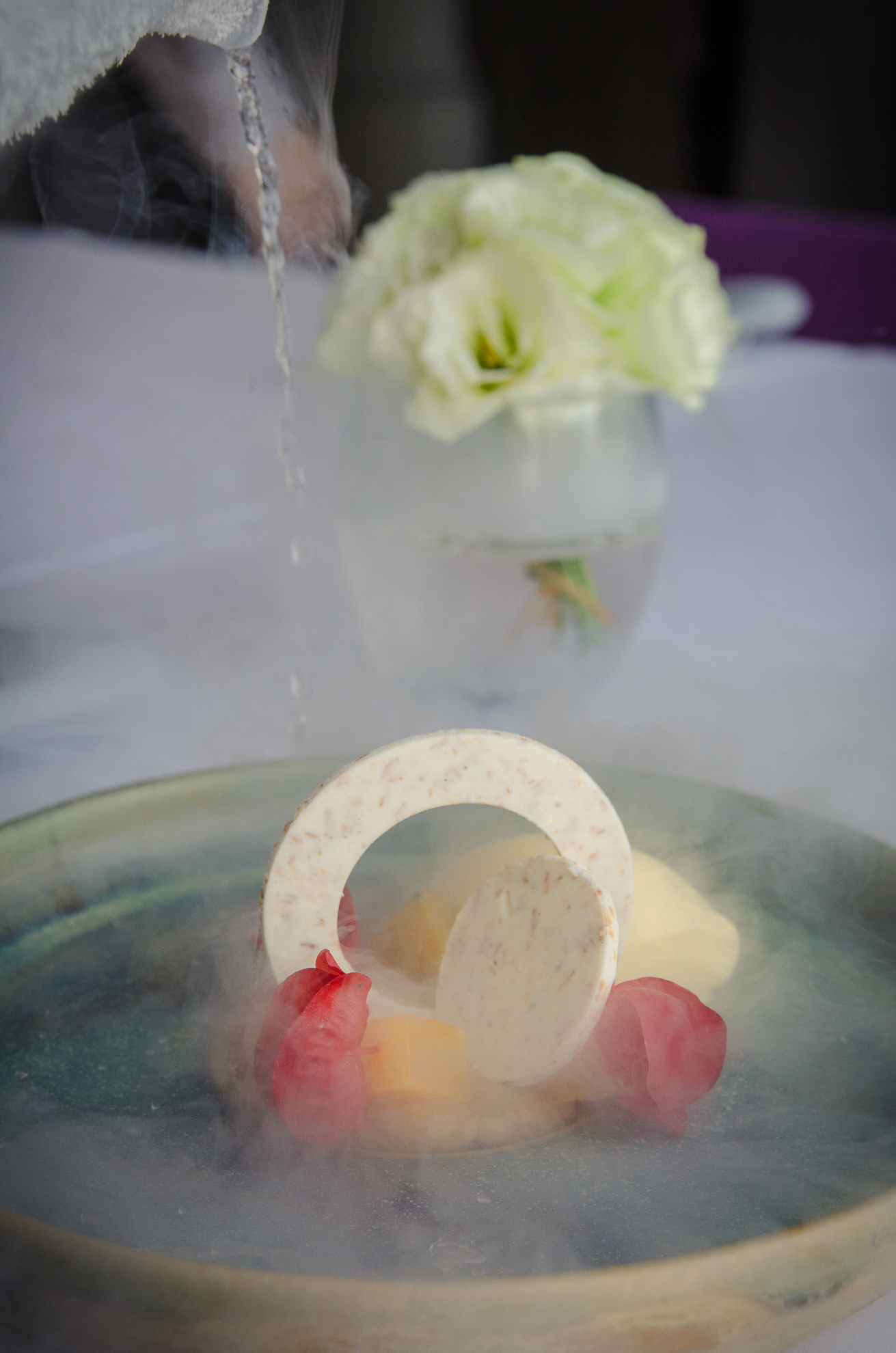
A molecular gastronomy dessert served with liquid nitrogen

Nicholas Kurti, Hungarian physicist, and Hervé This, at the INRA in France, coined "Molecular and Physical Gastronomy" in 1988.

== History ==
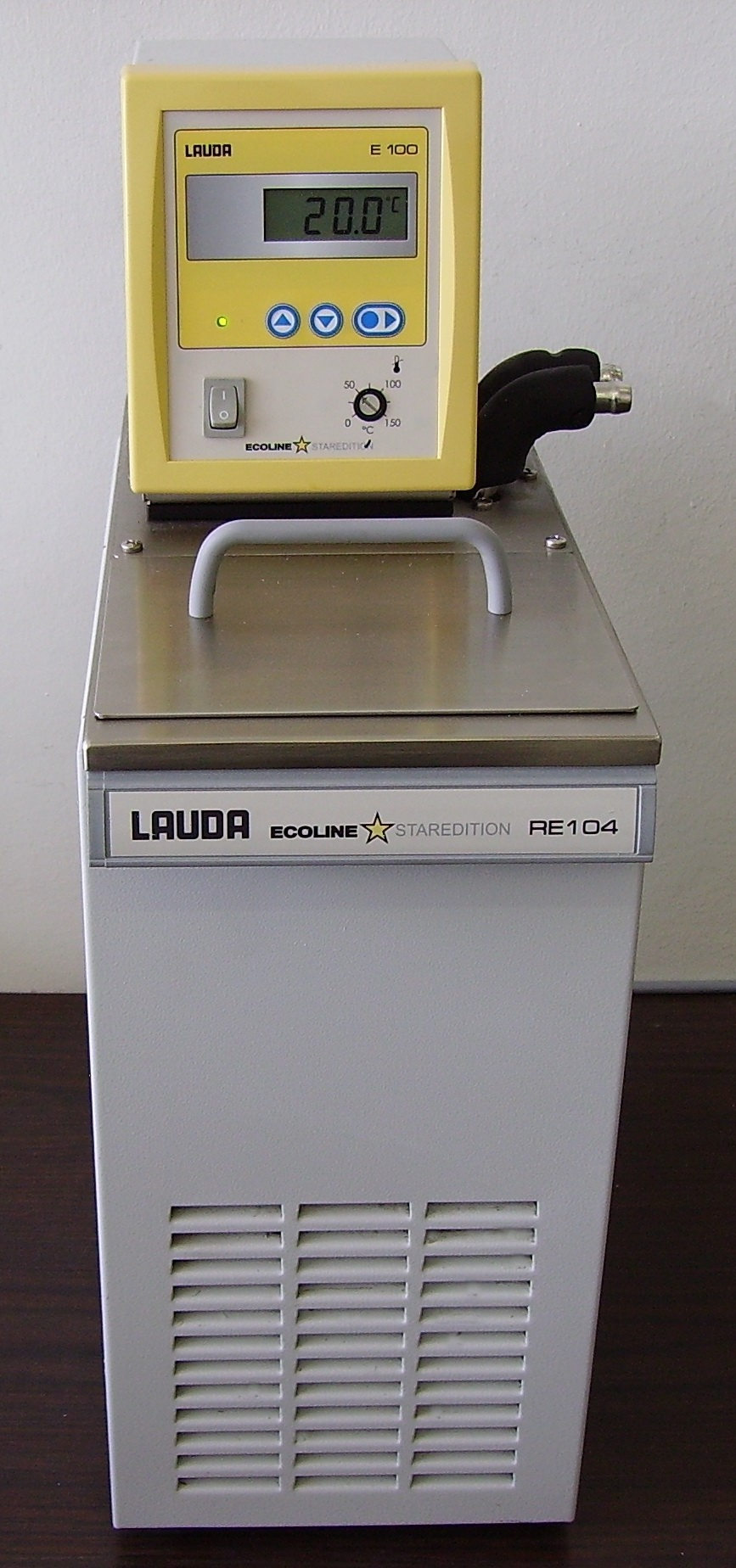
Heated bath used for low temperature cooking

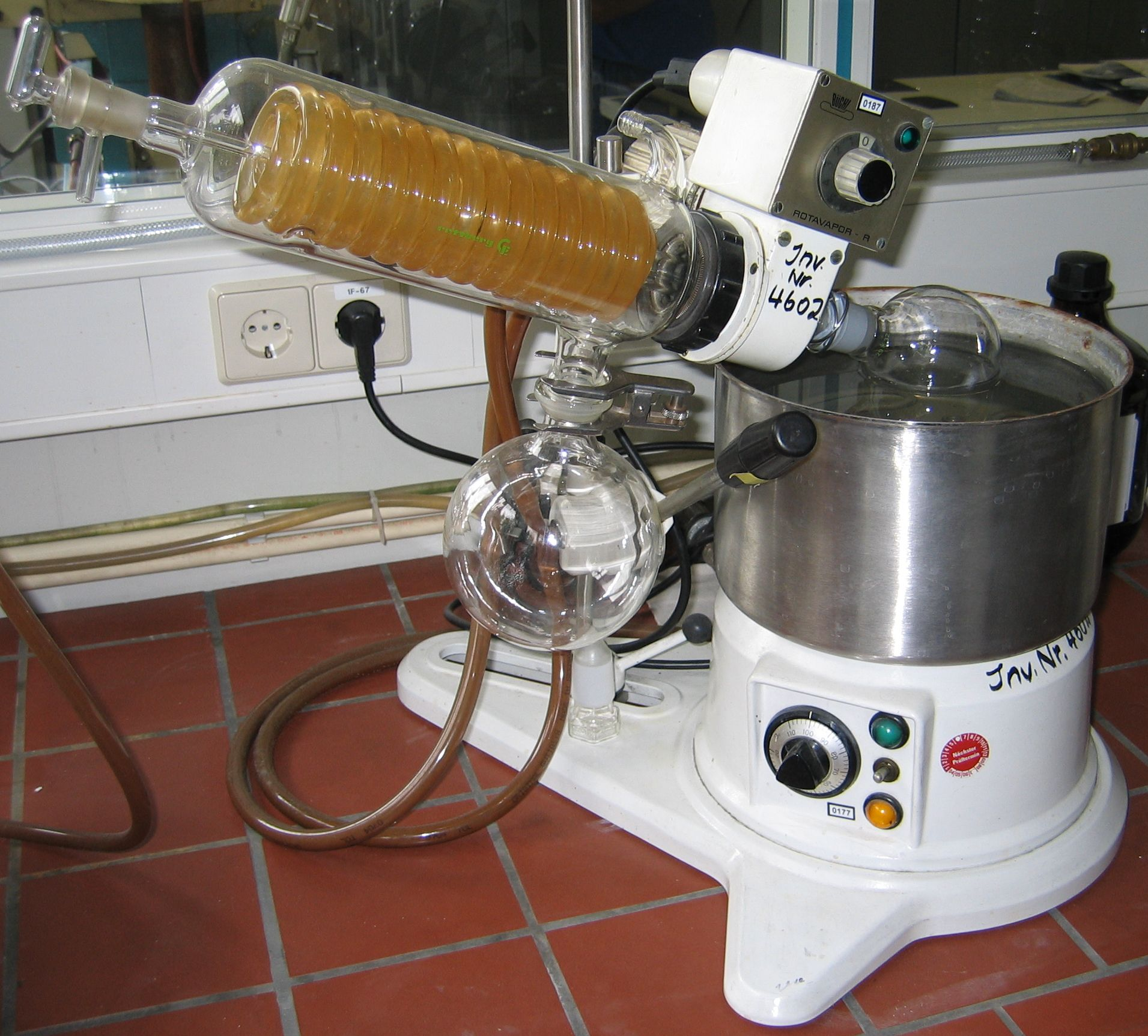
Rotary evaporator used in the preparation of distillates and extracts

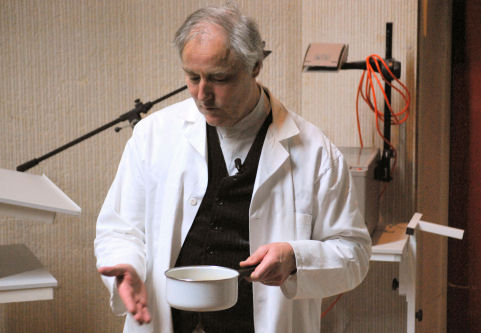
French chemist and cook Hervé This, known as "The Father of Molecular Gastronomy"

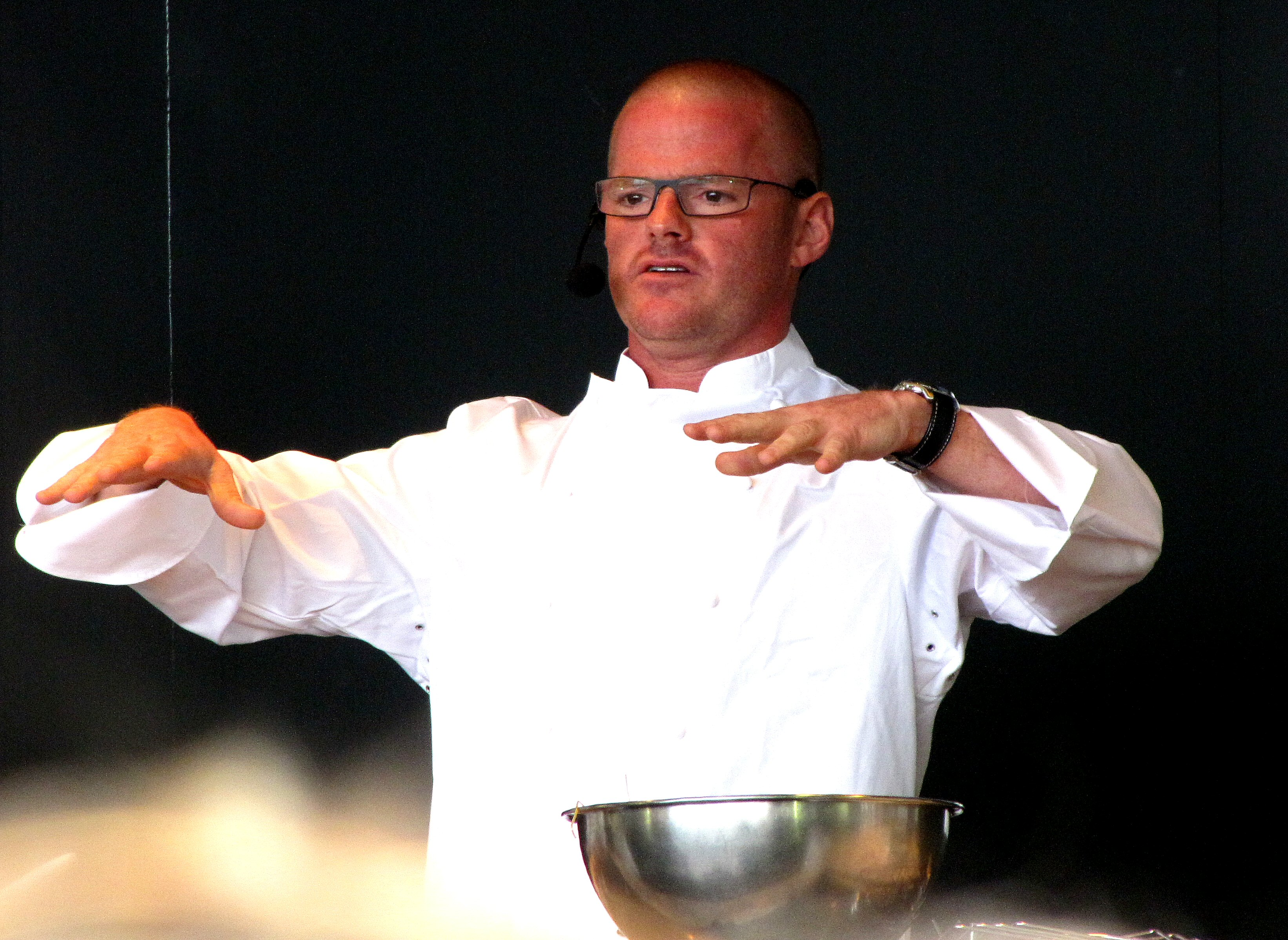
Heston Blumenthal dislikes the term 'molecular gastronomy', believing it makes the practice sound "complicated" and "elitist."

There are many branches of food science that study different aspects of food, such as safety, microbiology, preservation, chemistry, engineering, and physics. Until the advent of molecular gastronomy, there was no branch dedicated to studying the chemical processes of cooking in the home and in restaurants. Food science has primarily been concerned with industrial food production and, while the disciplines may overlap, they are considered separate areas of investigation.

The creation of the discipline of molecular gastronomy was intended to bring together what had previously been fragmented and isolated investigations into the chemical and physical processes of cooking into an organized discipline within food science, to address what the other disciplines within food science either do not cover, or cover in a manner intended for scientists rather than cooks.

The term "molecular and physical gastronomy" was coined in 1988 by Hungarian physicist Nicholas Kurti and French physical chemist Hervé This. In 1992, it became the title for a set of workshops held in Erice, Italy (originally titled "Science and Gastronomy") that brought together scientists and professional cooks for discussions about the science behind traditional cooking preparations. Eventually, the shortened term "molecular gastronomy" became the name of the approach, based on exploring the science behind traditional cooking methods.

Kurti and This considered the creation of a formal discipline around the subjects discussed in the meetings. After Kurti's death in 1998, the name of the Erice workshops were changed by This to "The International Workshop on Molecular Gastronomy 'N. Kurti'". This remained the sole director of the subsequent workshops from 1999, and continued his research in the field of molecular gastronomy at the Inra-AgroParisTech International Centre for Molecular Gastronomy, remaining in charge of organizing the international meetings.

=== Precursors ===
The idea of using techniques developed in chemistry to study food is not a new one, for instance the discipline of food science has existed for many years. Kurti and This acknowledged this fact and though they decided that a new, organized and specific discipline should be created within food science that investigated the processes in regular cooking (as food science was primarily concerned with the nutritional properties of food and developing methods to process food on an industrial scale), there are several notable examples throughout history of investigations into the science of everyday cooking recorded as far as back to 18th century.

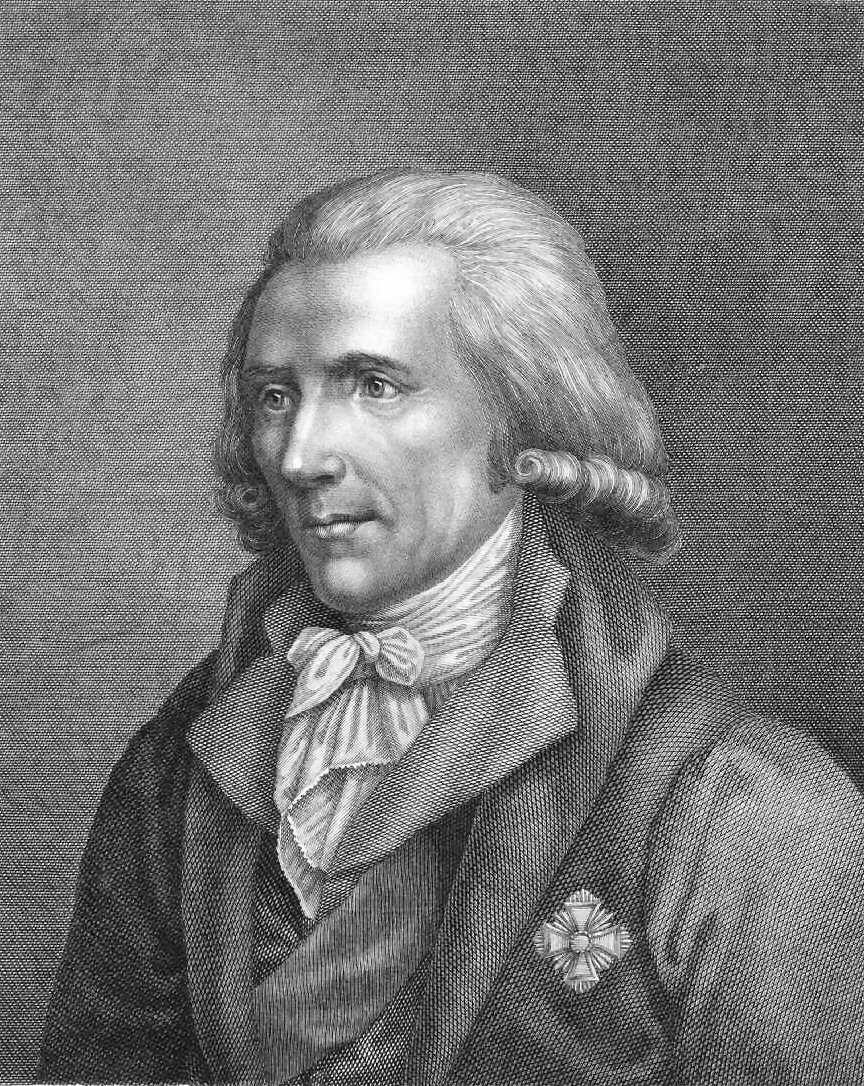
Benjamin Thompson, Count Rumford (1753–1814)

==== Marie-Antoine Carême (1784–1833) ====
The concept of molecular gastronomy was perhaps presaged by Marie-Antoine Carême, one of the most famous French chefs, who said in the early 19th century that when making a food stock "the broth must come to a boil very slowly, otherwise the albumin coagulates, hardens; the water, not having time to penetrate the meat, prevents the gelatinous part of the osmazome from detaching itself."

==== Raymond Roussel (1877-1933) ====
French writer Raymond Roussel, in his 1914 story "L'Allée aux lucioles" ("The Alley of Fireflies"), introduces a fictionalized version of French chemist Antoine de Lavoisier who, in the story, creates an apparently edible semi-permeable coating ("invol ...") that he uses to encase a tiny frozen sculpture made from one type of wine, which is immersed in another type of wine. The story cites the fictional event as significant "in both the annals of science and the history of improved gastronomy."

==== Evelyn G. Halliday and Isabel T. Noble ====
In 1943 the University of Chicago Press published a book titled Food Chemistry and Cookery by the then University of Chicago Associate Professor of Home Economics Evelyn G. Halliday and University of Minnesota Associate Professor of Home Economics Isabel T. Noble. In the foreword of the 346-page book, the authors state that, "The main purpose of this book is to give an understanding of the chemical principles upon which good practices in food preparation and preservation are based."

The book includes chapters such as "The Chemistry of Milk", "The Chemistry of Baking Powders and Their Use in Baking", "The Chemistry of Vegetable Cookery" and "Determination of Hydrogen Ion Concentration" and contains numerous illustrations of lab experiments including a Distillation Apparatus for Vegetable Samples and a Pipette for Determining the Relative Viscosity of Pectin Solutions. The professors had previously published The Hows and Whys of Cooking in 1928.

==== Belle Lowe ====
In 1932, Belle Lowe, then the professor of Food and Nutrition at Iowa State College, published a book titled Experimental Cookery: From The Chemical And Physical Standpoint which became a standard textbook for home economics courses across the United States. The book is an exhaustively researched look into the science of everyday cooking referencing hundreds of sources and including many experiments. At a length of over 600 pages with section titles such as "The Relation Of Cookery To Colloidal Chemistry", "Coagulation Of Proteins", "The Factors Affecting The Viscosity Of Cream And Ice Cream", "Syneresis", "Hydrolysis Of Collagen" and "Changes In Cooked Meat And The Cooking Of Meat", the volume rivals or exceeds the scope of many other books on the subject, at a much earlier date.

==== Elizabeth Cawdry Thomas ====
Though rarely credited, the origins of the Erice workshops (originally entitled "Science and Gastronomy") can be traced back to cooking teacher Elizabeth Cawdry Thomas, who studied at Le Cordon Bleu in London and ran a cooking school in Berkeley, California. The one-time wife of a physicist, Thomas had many friends in the scientific community and an interest in the science of cooking. In 1988, while attending a meeting at the Ettore Majorana Center for Scientific Culture in Erice, Thomas had a conversation with Professor Ugo Valdrè of the University of Bologna, who agreed with her that the science of cooking was an undervalued subject, and encouraged Kurti to organize a workshop at the Ettore Majorana Center. However, nothing happened until Kurti met Hervé This; they approached the director of the Ettore Majorana center, physicist Antonino Zichichi, who liked the idea. They invited the food science writer Harold McGee to join them as invited co-director of the first workshops in 1992.

=== Nicholas Kurti ===
University of Oxford physicist Nicholas Kurti advocated applying scientific knowledge to culinary problems. He was one of the first television cooks in the UK, hosting a black-and-white television show in 1969 entitled The Physicist in the Kitchen, where he demonstrated techniques such as using a syringe to inject hot mince pies with brandy in order to avoid disturbing the crust. That same year, he held a presentation for the Royal Society of London (also entitled "The Physicist in the Kitchen") in which he stated:

I think it is a sad reflection on our civilization that while we can and do measure the temperature in the atmosphere of Venus we do not know what goes on inside our soufflés.

Kurti demonstrated making meringue in a vacuum chamber, the cooking of sausages by connecting them across a car battery, the digestion of protein by fresh pineapple juice, and a reverse baked alaska—hot inside, cold outside—cooked in a microwave oven. Kurti was also an advocate of low temperature cooking, repeating 18th century experiments by British scientist Benjamin Thompson by leaving a 2 kg (4.4 lb) lamb joint in an oven at 80 °C (176 °F). After 8.5 hours, both the inside and outside temperature of the lamb joint were around 75 °C (167 °F), and the meat was tender and juicy.

With his wife Giana, Kurti edited an anthology on food and science by fellows and foreign members of the Royal Society.

=== Hervé This ===
Hervé This started collecting "culinary precisions" (old kitchen wives' tales and cooking tricks) the 24th of March 1980, and started testing these precisions to see which held up; his collection eventually numbered some 25,000. In 1995, he received a PhD in Physical Chemistry of Materials, for which he wrote his thesis on "La gastronomie moléculaire et physique" (molecular and physical gastronomy). He served as an adviser to the French minister of education, lectured internationally, and was invited to join the lab of Nobel-winning molecular chemist Jean-Marie Lehn. This has published several books in French, four of which have been translated into English, including Molecular Gastronomy: Exploring the Science of Flavor, Kitchen Mysteries: Revealing the Science of Cooking, Cooking: The Quintessential Art, and Building a Meal: From Molecular Gastronomy to Culinary Constructivism.

He currently publishes a series of essays in French, and hosts free monthly seminars on molecular gastronomy at the INRA in France. He gives free and public seminars on molecular gastronomy every month, and annually gives a public and free course on molecular gastronomy. Hervé This also authors a website and a pair of blogs on the subject in French, and publishes monthly collaborations with French chef Pierre Gagnaire on Gagnaire's website.

== Objectives ==
The objectives of molecular gastronomy, as defined by Hervé This, are seeking for the mechanisms of culinary transformations and processes (from a chemical and physical point of view) in three areas:

1. the social phenomena linked to culinary activity
2. the artistic component of culinary activity
3. the technical component of culinary activity

The original fundamental objectives of molecular gastronomy were defined by This in his doctoral dissertation as:

1. Investigating culinary and gastronomical proverbs, sayings and old wives' tales
2. Exploring existing recipes
3. Introducing new tools, ingredients and methods into the kitchen
4. Inventing new dishes
5. Using molecular gastronomy to help the general public understand the contribution of science to society

Hervé This later recognized points 3, 4, and 5 as being not entirely scientific endeavors (more application of technology and educational), and has revised the list.

=== Areas of investigation ===
Prime topics for study include

- How ingredients are changed by different cooking methods
- How the senses play their own roles in the appreciation of food
- The mechanisms of aroma release and the perception of taste and flavor
- How and why humans evolved particular taste and flavor sense organs, as well as general food preferences
- How cooking methods affect the eventual flavor and texture of food ingredients
- How new cooking methods produce improved results of texture and flavor
- How brains interpret the signals from the senses to determine the flavor of food
- How the enjoyment of food is affected by other influences, the environment, one's mood, how it is presented, who prepares it, etc.

== Chefs ==
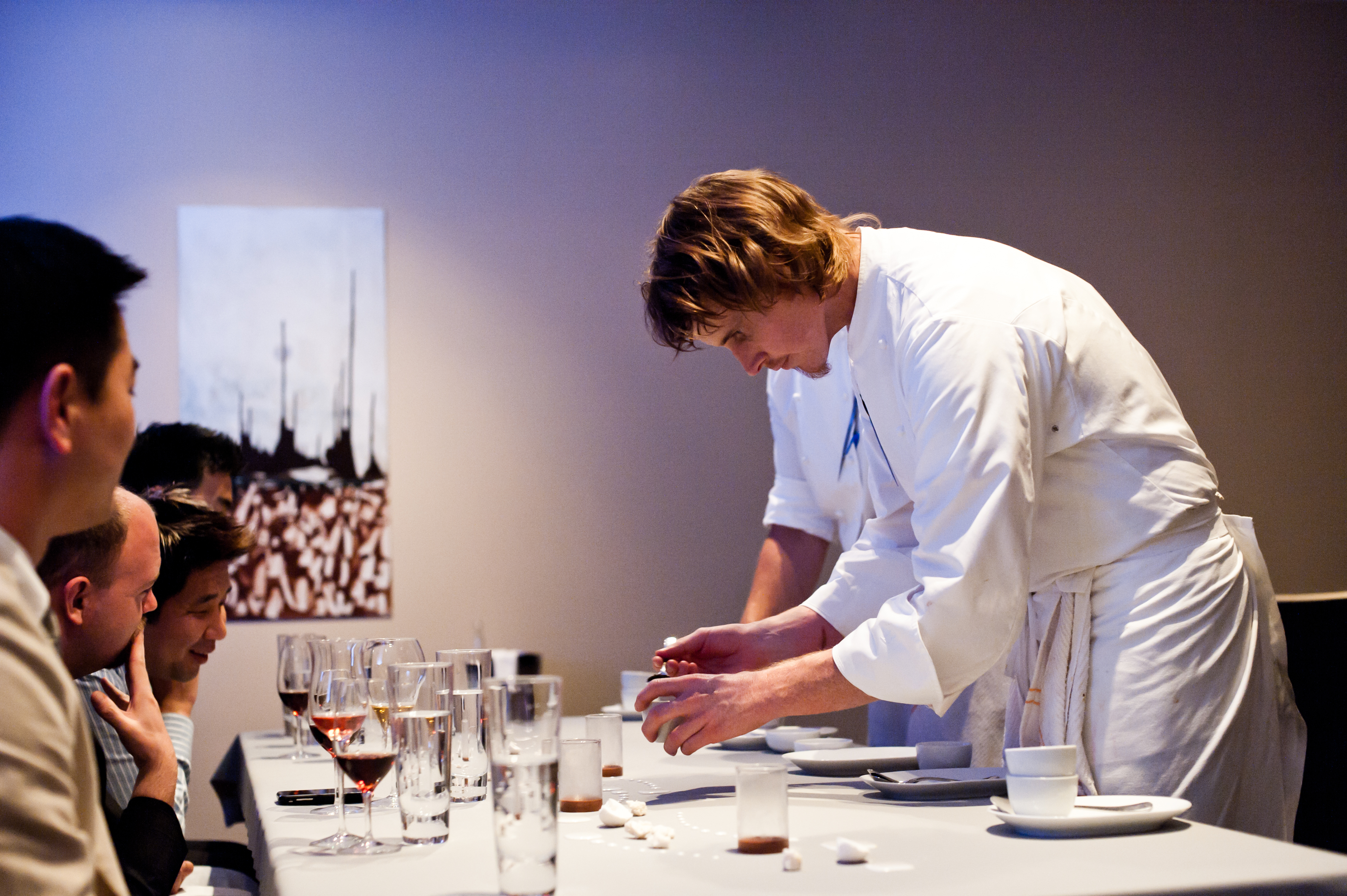
Grant Achatz shown plating a dish at Alinea, has been called the leading American chef in molecular gastronomy.

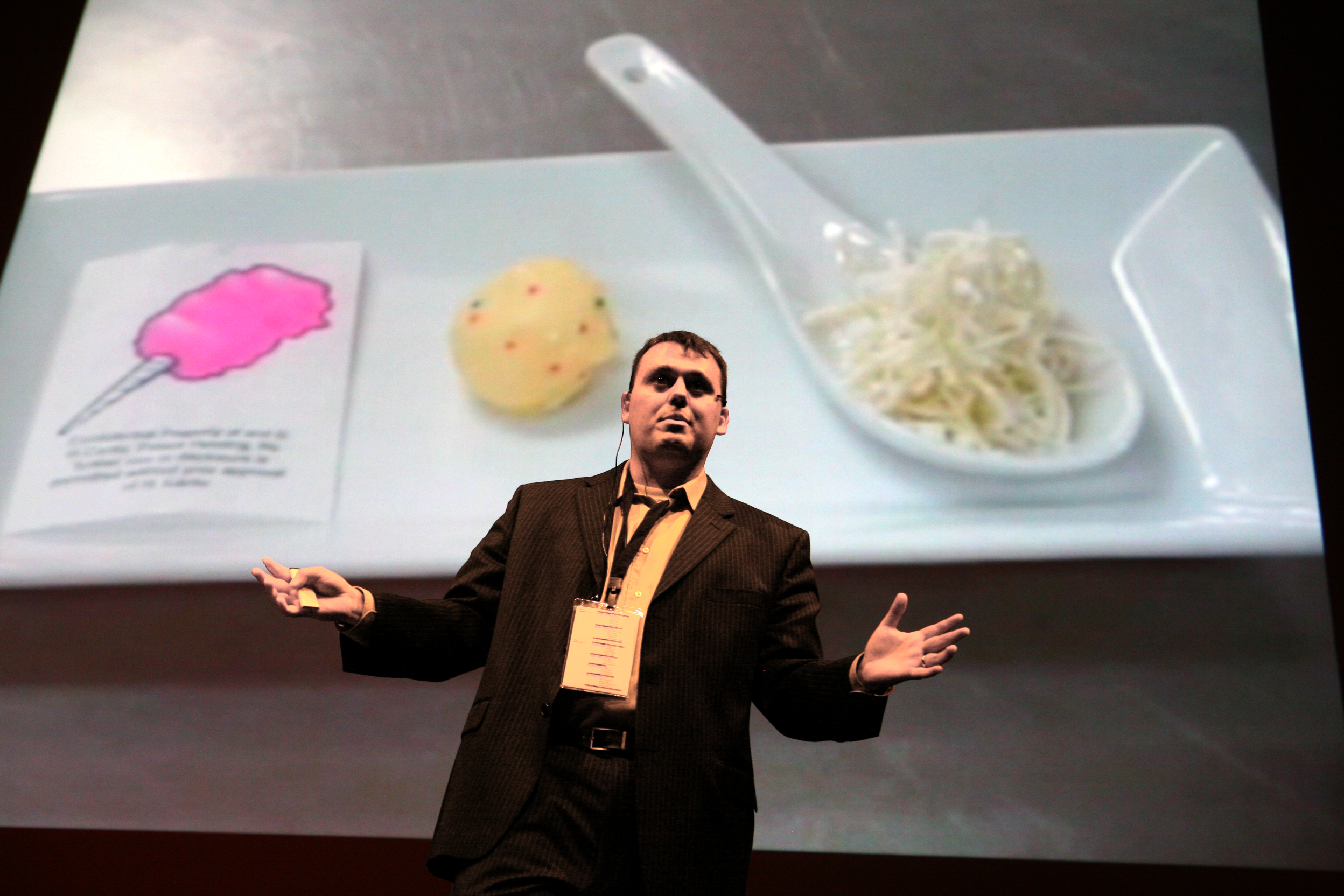
Homaro Cantu of Moto Restaurant was a molecular gastronomer.

In the late 1990s and early 2000s, the term started to be used to describe a new style of cooking in which some chefs began to explore new possibilities in the kitchen by embracing science, research, technological advances in equipment and various natural gums and hydrocolloids produced by the commercial food processing industry. It has since been used to describe the food and cooking of a number of famous chefs, though many of them do not accept the term as a description of their style of cooking.

Chefs who are often associated with molecular gastronomy because of their embrace of science include Heston Blumenthal, Grant Achatz, Ferran Adrià, José Andrés, Marcel Vigneron, Homaro Cantu, Michael Carlson, Wylie Dufresne, and Adam Melonas.

Despite their central role in the popularisation of science-based cuisine, both Adria and Blumenthal have expressed their frustration with the common mis-classification of their food and cooking as "molecular gastronomy", On 10 December 2006 Blumenthal and Harold McGee published a 'Statement on the "New Cookery" in the Observer in order to summarise what they saw as the central tenets of modern cuisine. Ferran Adria of El Bulli and Thomas Keller of the French Laundry and Per Se signed up to this and together released a joint statement in 2006 clarifying their approach to cooking, stating that the term "molecular gastronomy" was coined in 1992 for a single workshop that did not influence them, and that the term does not describe any style of cooking.

In February 2011, Nathan Myhrvold published Modernist Cuisine, which led many chefs to further classify molecular gastronomy versus modernist cuisine. Myhrvold believes that his cooking style should not be called molecular gastronomy.

== Techniques, tools and ingredients ==
- Carbon dioxide source, for adding bubbles and making foams
- Foams can also be made with an immersion blender
- Liquid nitrogen, for flash freezing and shattering
- Ice cream maker, often used to make unusual flavors, including savory
- Anti-griddle, for cooling and freezing
- Thermal immersion circulator for sous-vide (low temperature cooking)
- Food dehydrator
- Centrifuge
- Maltodextrin – can turn a high-fat liquid into a powder
- Sugar substitutes
- Enzymes
- Lecithin – an emulsifier and non-stick agent
- Hydrocolloids such as starch, gelatin, pectin and natural gums – used as thickening agents, gelling agents, emulsifying agents and stabilizers, sometimes needed for foams
- Transglutaminase – a protein binder, called meat glue
- Spherification – a caviar-like effect
- Syringe, for injecting unexpected fillings
- Edible paper made from soybeans and potato starch, for use with edible fruit inks and an inkjet printer
- Aromatic accompaniment: gases trapped in a bag, a serving device, or the food itself; an aromatic substance presented as a garnish or creative serveware; or a smell produced by burning
- Presentation style is often whimsical or avant-garde, and may include unusual serviceware
- Unusual flavor combinations (food pairings) are favored, such as combining savory and sweet
- Using ultrasound to achieve more precise cooking times

== Alternative names and related pursuits ==
The term molecular gastronomy was originally intended to refer only to the scientific investigation of cooking, though it has been adopted by a number of people and applied to cooking itself or to describe a style of cuisine.

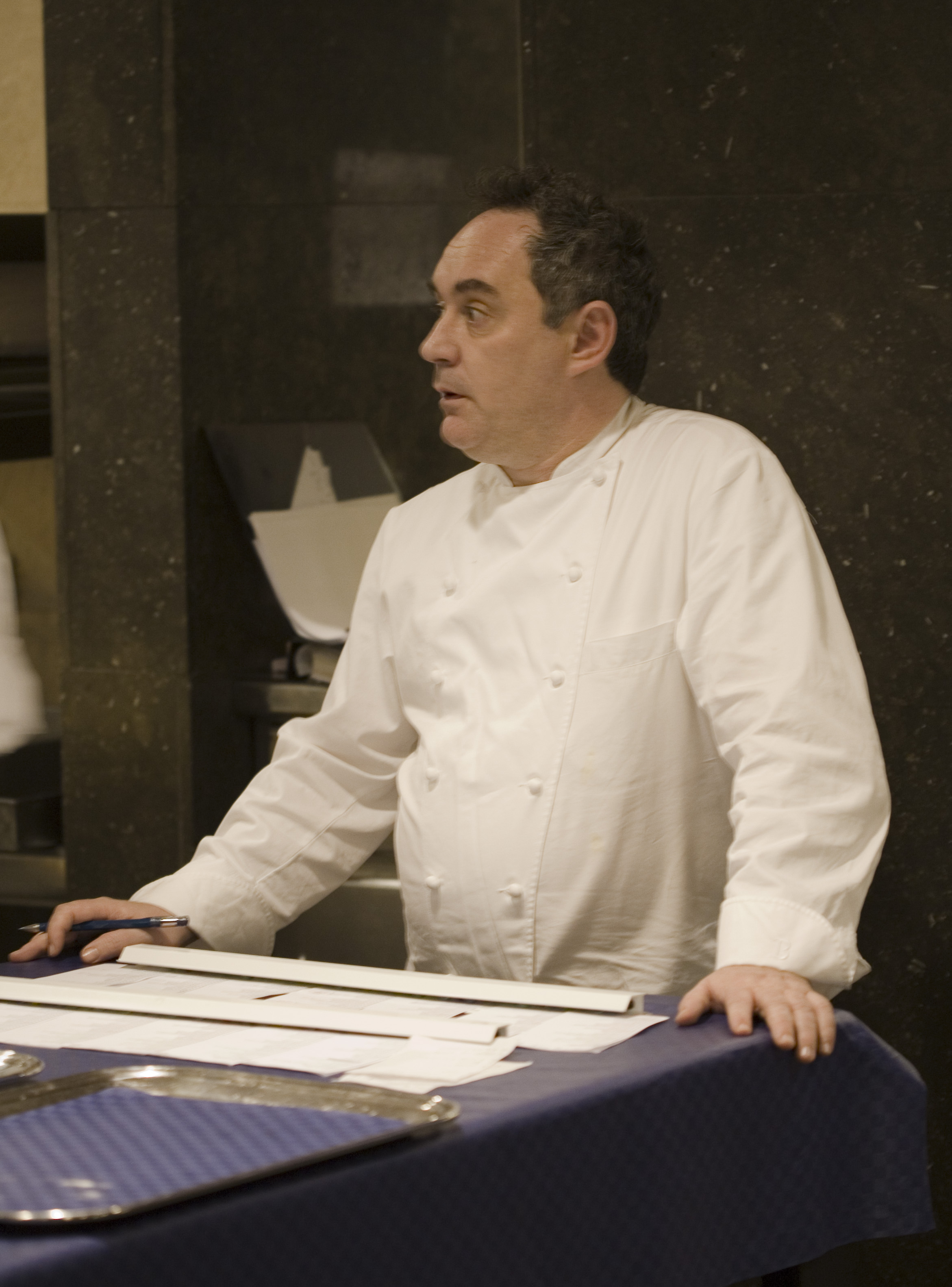
Ferran Adrià of El Bulli, prefers the term 'deconstructivist' to describe his style of cooking.

Other names for the style of cuisine practiced by these chefs include:

- Avant-garde cuisine
- Culinary constructivism
- Cocina de vanguardia – term used by Ferran Adrià
- Emotional cuisine
- Experimental cuisine
- Forward-thinking movement – term used at Grant Achatz's Alinea
- Kitchen science
- Modern cuisine
- Modernist cuisine, which shares its name with a cookbook by Nathan Myhrvold, and which is endorsed by Ferran Adrià of El Bulli and David Chang
- Molecular cuisine
- Molecular cooking
- New cuisine
- New cookery
- Nueva cocina
- Progressive cuisine
- Techno-emotional cuisine—term preferred by elBulli research and development chef Ferran Adrià
- Technologically forward cuisine
- Vanguard cuisine
- Techno-cuisine

No singular name has ever been applied in consensus, and the term "molecular gastronomy" continues to be used often as a blanket term to refer to any and all of these things—particularly in the media. Ferran Adrià hates the term "molecular gastronomy" and prefers 'deconstructivist' to describe his style of cooking. A 2006 open letter by Ferran Adria, Heston Blumenthal, Thomas Keller and Harold McGee published in The Times used no specific term, referring only to "a new approach to cooking" and "our cooking".

== Examples ==
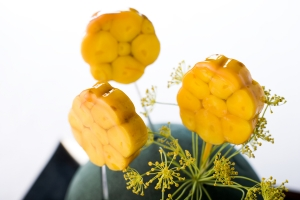
Adam Melonas's signature preparation is an edible floral center piece named the "Octopop": a very low temperature cooked octopus fused using transglutaminase, dipped into an orange and saffron carrageenan gel and suspended on dill flower stalks

New dishes named after famous scientists include:

- Gibbs – infusing vanilla pods in egg white with sugar, adding olive oil and then microwave cooking. Named after physicist Josiah Willard Gibbs (1839–1903).
- Vauquelin – using orange juice or cranberry juice with added sugar when whipping eggs to increase the viscosity and to stabilize the foam, and then microwave cooking. Named after Nicolas Vauquelin (1763–1829), one of Lavoisier's teachers.
- Baumé – soaking a whole egg for a month in alcohol to create a coagulated egg. Named after the French chemist Antoine Baumé (1728–1804).

== See also ==
=== People ===
- Dave Arnold
- Peter Barham
- Shirley Corriher
- Luke Hayes-Alexander
- Paul Liebrandt
- Don Mottram
- Russ Parsons
- Alessandro Stratta
- Robert Wolke

=== Restaurants ===
- Alex
- The Fat Duck
- Schwa

=== Subjects ===
- Foodpairing
- Futurist cooking
- Molecular mixology
- Spherification
- Note by Note cuisine
