= Don Mottram =

English flavour chemist

Don Mottram (born 1945 in Cheshire) is a retired English flavour chemist based at the Department of Food and Nutritional Sciences of the University of Reading.

Having obtained an honours degree in colour chemistry from the University of Leeds in 1967 he spent a year working as a volunteer with Voluntary Service Overseas in Dacca, Bangladesh (formerly East Pakistan) before returning to Leeds to study for a Ph.D. in colour chemistry. Following his graduation in 1971, Mottram took up a post at the Meat Research Institute at Langford, near Bristol, UK.

Mottram moved to the University of Reading in 1988. His research interests are mainly in the area of flavour chemistry, the analysis of flavour and the factors affecting its formation and retention in foods, especially meat.

Following the detection of the potential carcinogen acrylamide in a range of fried and oven-cooked foods, Mottram, in collaboration with Professor Bronek Wedzicha of the University of Leeds, provided an important breakthrough in understanding the origin of acrylamide in cooked foods which was published in Nature.

Mottram also collaborated with chef Heston Blumenthal of The Fat Duck restaurant in the village of Bray in Berkshire.
