= South East England =

Region of England

- Region
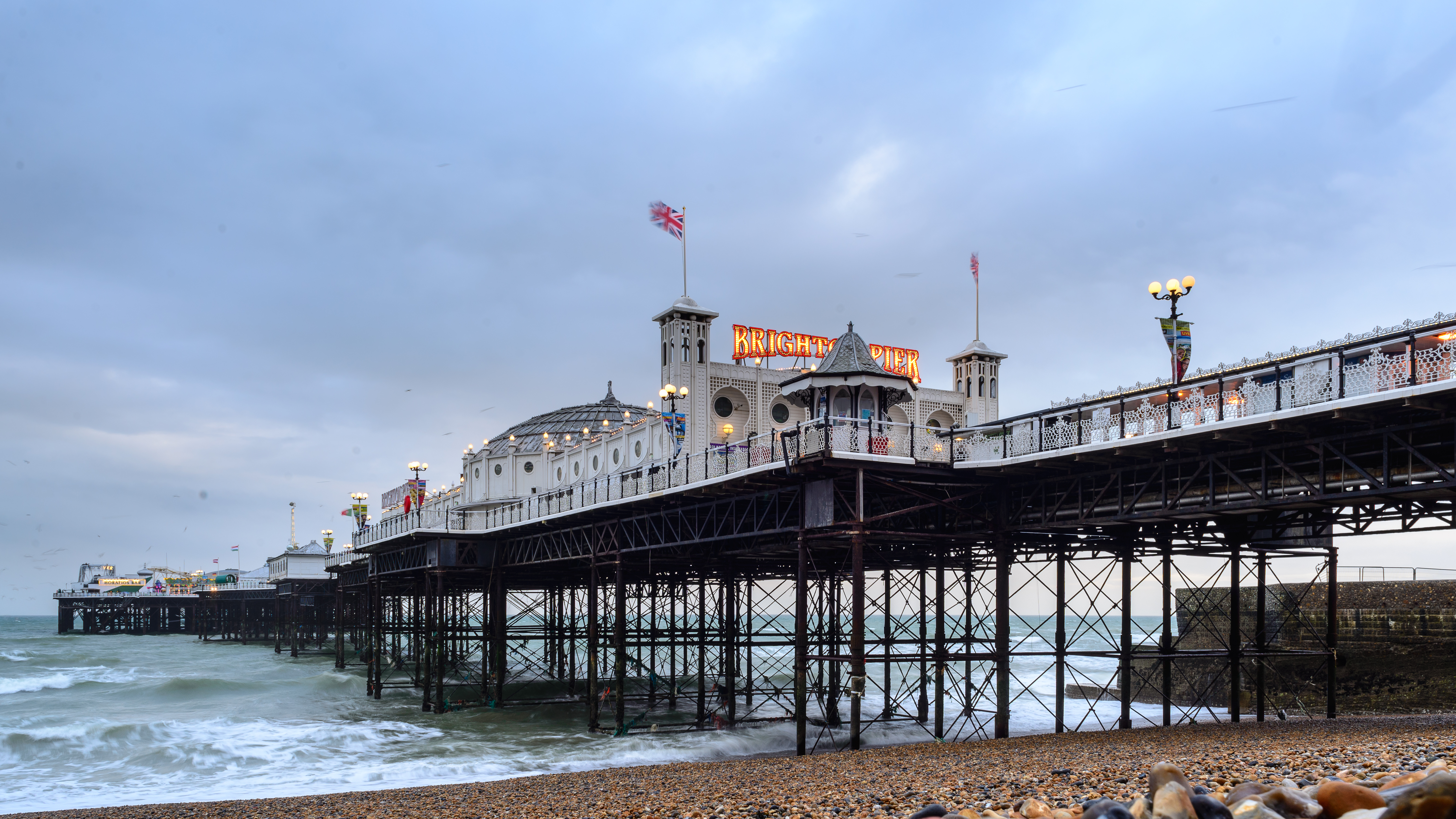
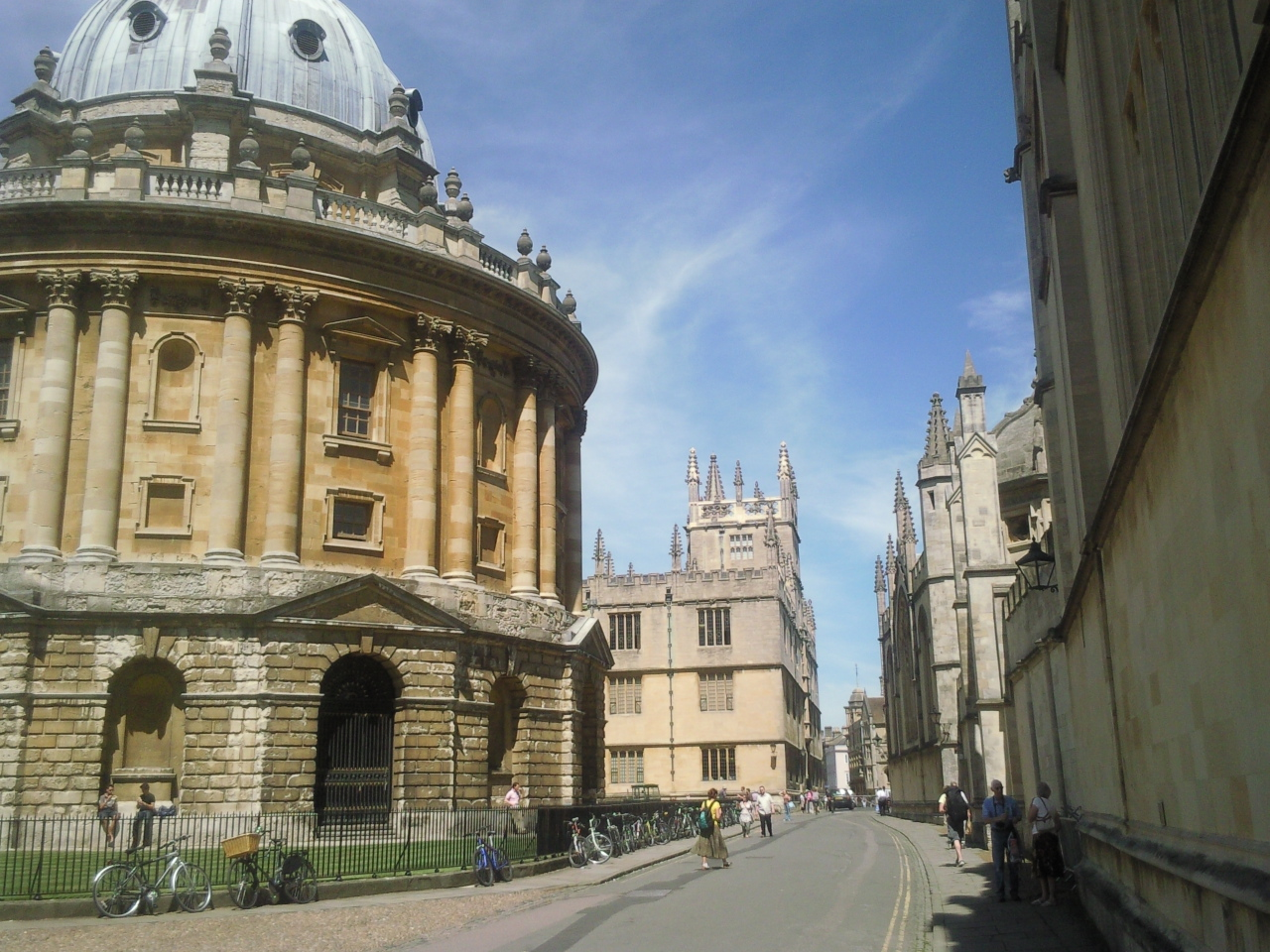
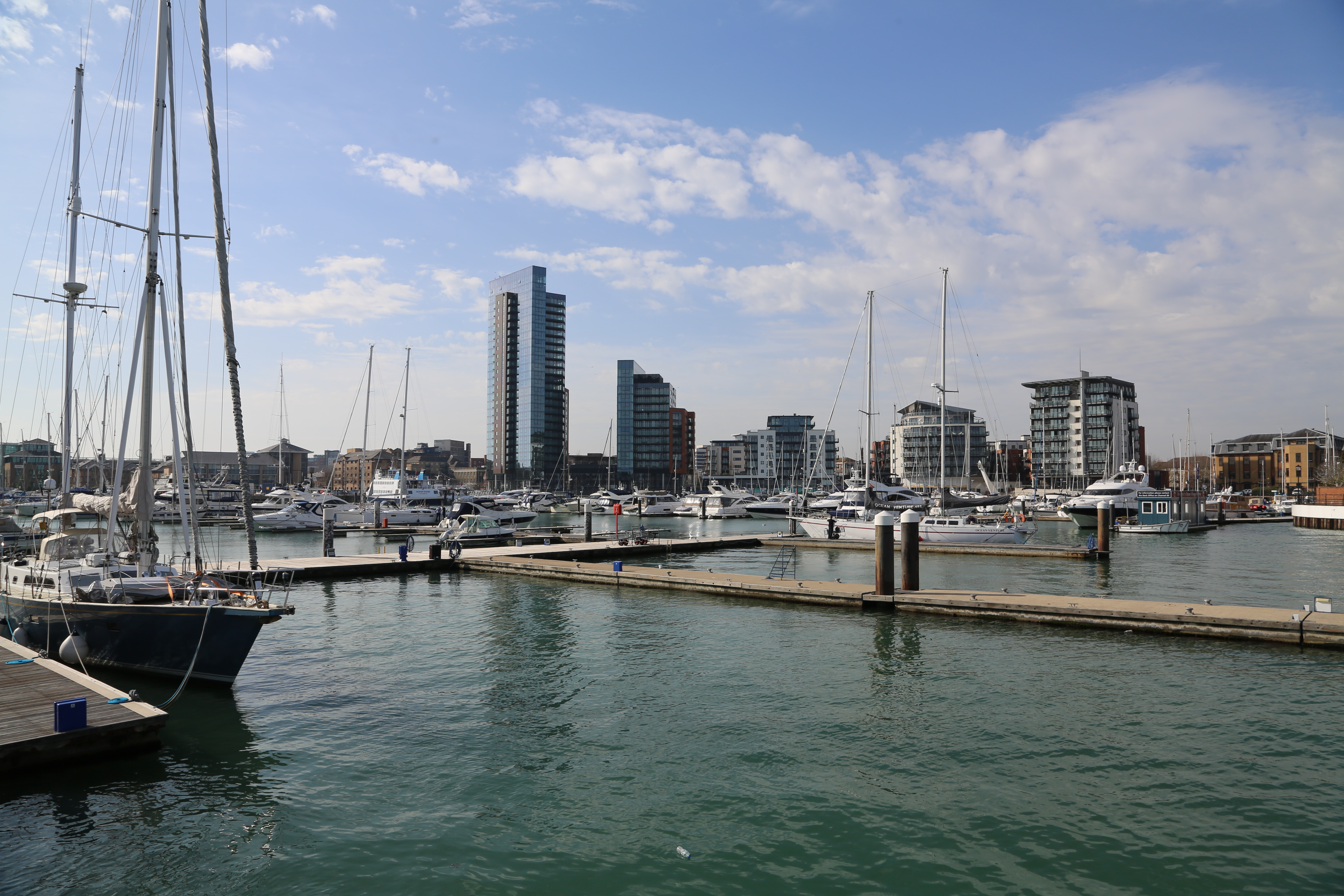
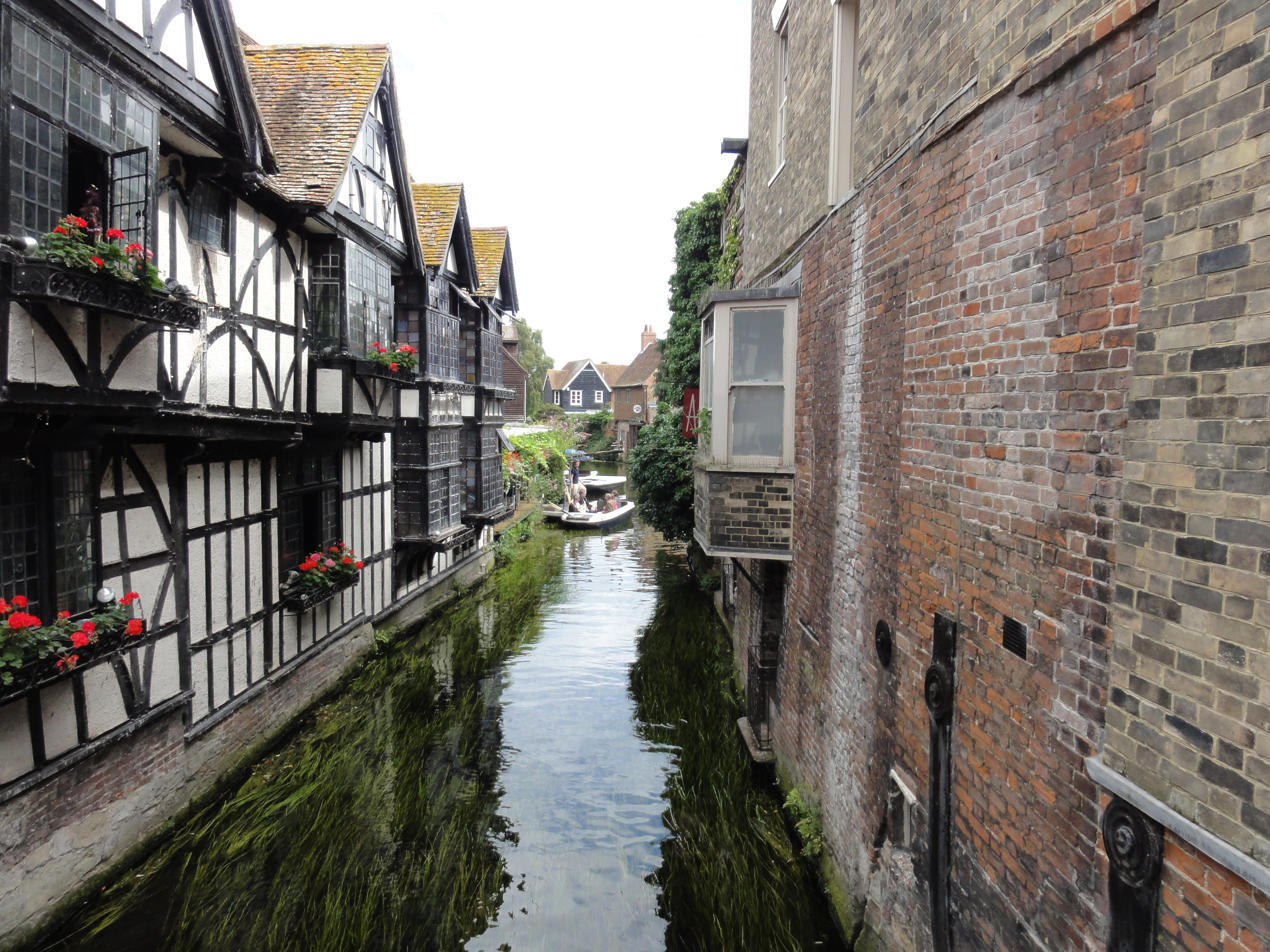
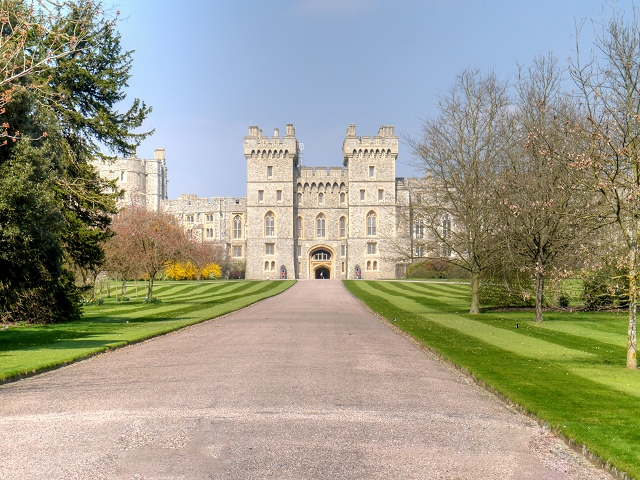
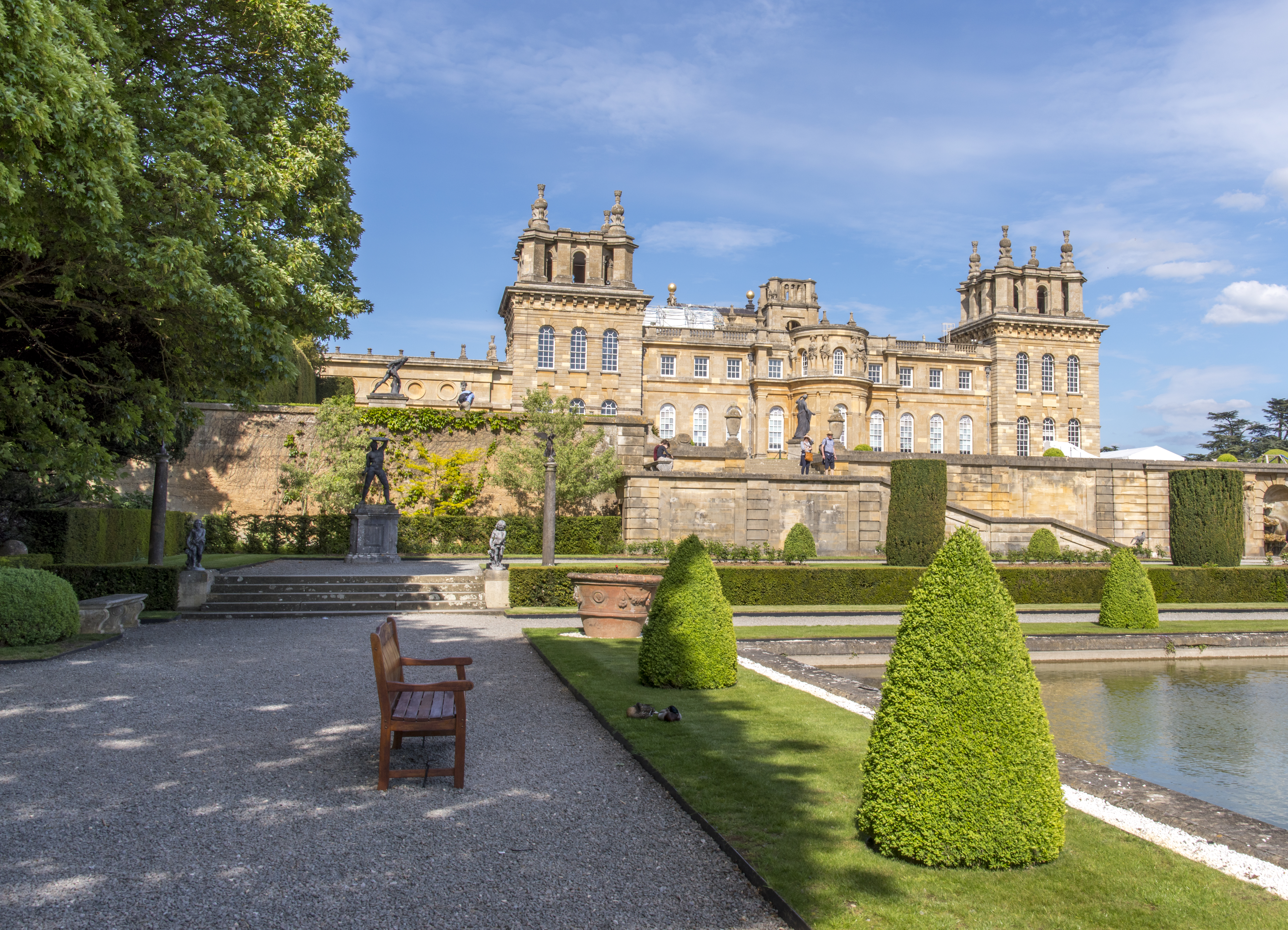
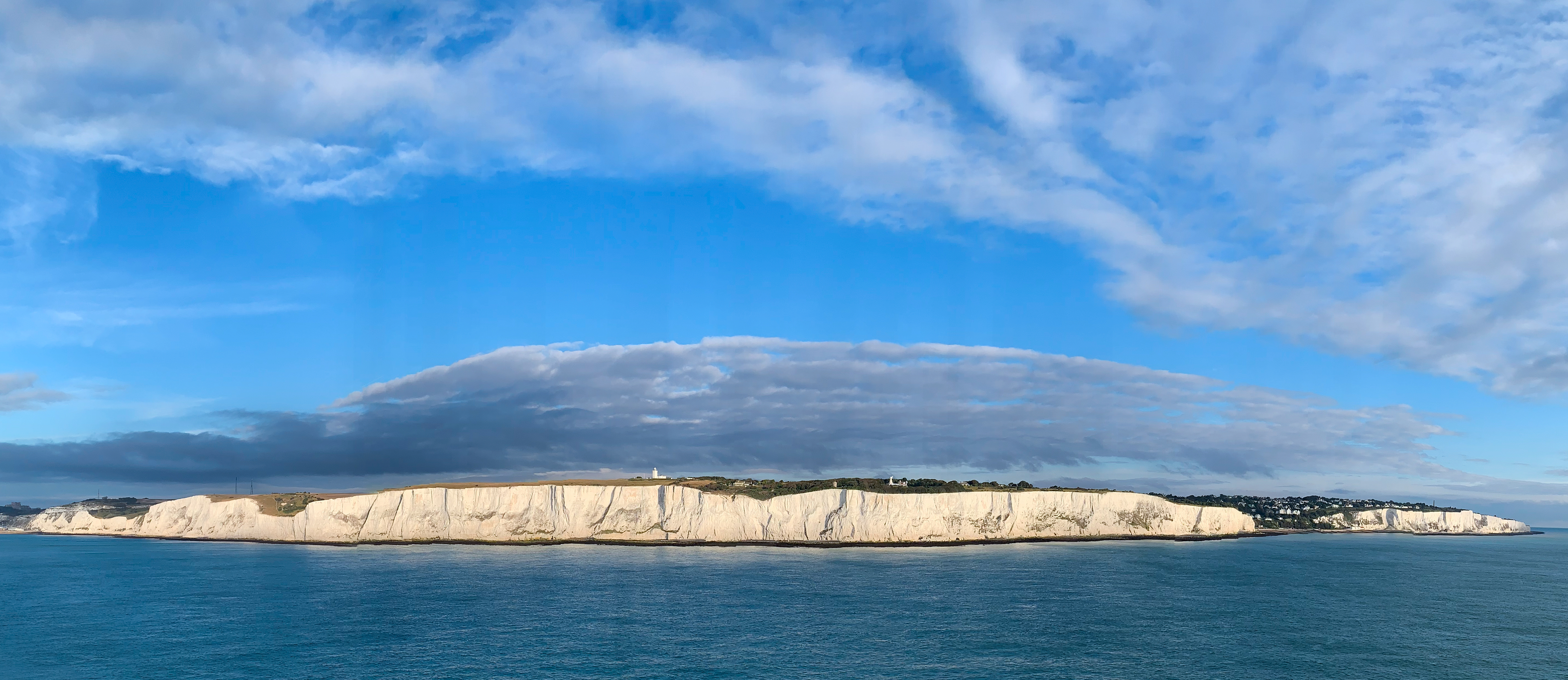
- From top, left to right: Brighton; Oxford; Southampton; Canterbury; Windsor Castle; Blenheim Palace; White Cliffs of Dover

- South East region shown within England
- Coordinates: 51.3°N 0.8°W
- Sovereign state: United Kingdom
- Country: England
- GO established: 1994
- RDA established: 1998
- GO abolished: 2011
- RDA abolished: 31 March 2012
- Subdivisions: 9 counties: Berkshire; Buckinghamshire; East Sussex; Hampshire; Isle of Wight; Kent; Oxfordshire; Surrey; West Sussex; 64 districts: 13 unitary; 51 non-metropolitan in 6 non-metropolitan counties

Government
  - Type: Local authority leaders' board
  - Body: South East Councils
  - MPs: 91 MPs (of 650)

Area
  - Total: 7,500 sq mi (19,400 km^{2})
  - Land: 7,364 sq mi (19,072 km^{2})
  - Rank: 3rd

Population (2025)
  - Total: 9,691,844
  - Rank: 1st
  - Density: 1,320/sq mi (508/km^{2})

Ethnicity (2021)
  - Ethnic groups: List: 86.3% White; 7.0% Asian; 2.8% Mixed; 2.4% Black; 1.5% other

Religion (2021)
  - Religion: List: 46.5% Christianity; 40.2% no religion; 3.3% Islam; 1.7% Hinduism; 0.8% Sikhism; 0.6% Buddhism; 0.2% Judaism; 0.6% other; 6.1% not stated
- Time zone: UTC+0 (GMT)
  - Summer (DST): UTC+1 (BST)
- ITL code: TLJ
- GSS code: E12000008

South East England is one of the nine official regions of England that are in the top level category for statistical purposes. It consists of the nine counties of Berkshire, Buckinghamshire, East Sussex, Hampshire, the Isle of Wight, Kent, Oxfordshire, Surrey and West Sussex. (Note: London is legally an independent region, though is sometimes referred to colloquially as being within South East England.) South East England is the third-largest region of England, with a land area of 19,072 square kilometres (7,364 sq mi), and is also the most populous with a total population of 9,691,844 in 2025.

South East England contains eight legally chartered cities: Brighton and Hove, Canterbury, Chichester, Milton Keynes, Oxford, Portsmouth, Southampton and Winchester. Officially it does not include London, which is a separate region. The geographical term for "South East England" may differ from the official definition of the region; for example, London, Bedfordshire, Hertfordshire and Essex are sometimes colloquially referred to as being in the south east of England. This article only considers the South East as being the official statistical region.

In medieval times, South East England included much of the Kingdom of Wessex, which was the precursor to the modern state of England. Winchester was the capital of England after unification of the various states, including the kingdoms of Kent, Sussex and Mercia. Winchester stopped being the administrative capital of England some time in the 13th century as its influence waned while the City of London dominated commerce. The last monarch to be crowned at Winchester was Richard II in 1377, although the last monarch to be crowned by the Bishop of Winchester was Queen Mary I in 1553.

Today, the region's close proximity to London has led to South East England becoming a prosperous economic hub with the largest economy of any region in the UK, after London. The region is home to Gatwick Airport (the UK's second busiest airport). The coastline along the English Channel provides numerous ferry crossings to mainland Europe. South East England is also known for its countryside, which includes two national parks: the New Forest and the South Downs, as well as the North Downs, the Chiltern Hills and part of the Cotswolds. The River Thames flows through the region and its basin is known as the Thames Valley.

It is also the location of a number of internationally known places of interest, such as HMS Victory in Portsmouth, Cliveden in Buckinghamshire, Thorpe Park and RHS Wisley in Surrey, Blenheim Palace in Oxfordshire, Windsor Castle in Berkshire, Leeds Castle, the White Cliffs of Dover and Canterbury Cathedral in Kent, Brighton Palace Pier, and Hammerwood Park in East Sussex, and Wakehurst Place in West Sussex. The region has many universities; the University of Oxford is the oldest in the English-speaking world, and ranked among the best in the world.

South East England is host to various sporting events, including the annual Henley Royal Regatta, Royal Ascot and The Derby, and sporting venues include Wentworth Golf Club and Brands Hatch. Some of the events of the 2012 Summer Olympics were held in the south east, including the rowing at Eton Dorney and part of the cycling road race in the Surrey Hills.

== History ==
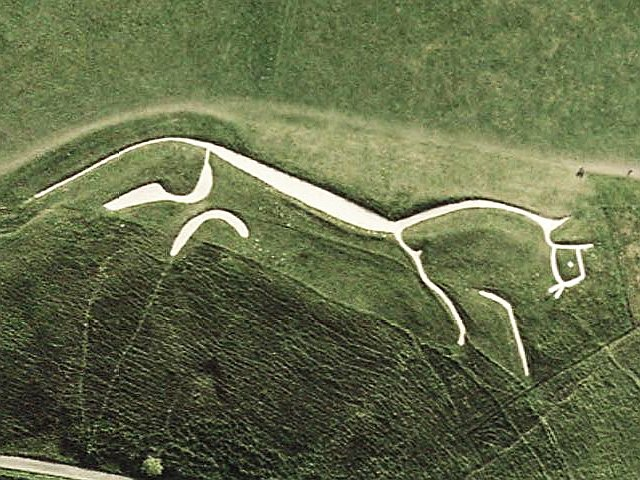
Uffington White Horse, a prehistoric hill figure on the Berkshire Downs

The Meonhill Vineyard, near Old Winchester Hill in east Hampshire on the South Downs south of West Meon on the A32, is an example of a site where the Romano-British grew Roman grapes.

=== Second World War ===
Much of the Battle of Britain was fought in this region, especially in Kent. RAF Bomber Command was based at High Wycombe. RAF Medmenham at Danesfield House, west of Marlow in Buckinghamshire, was important for aerial reconnaissance. Operation Corona, based at RAF Kingsdown (at West Kingsdown next to Brands Hatch in Kent, between the A20 and M20), was implemented to confuse German night fighters with native German-speakers, and coordinated by the RAF Y service.

Bletchley Park in north Buckinghamshire was the principal Allied centre for codebreaking. The Colossus computer, arguably the world's first, began working on Lorentz codes on 5 February 1944, with Colossus 2 working from June 1944. The site was chosen, among other reasons, because it is at the junction of the Varsity Line (between Oxford and Cambridge) and the West Coast Main Line. The Harwell computer (Dekatron), now at the National Museum of Computing at Bletchley, was built in 1949 and is believed to be the oldest working digital computer in the world.

=== Scientific heritage ===
John Wallis of Kent introduced the symbol for infinity and the standard notation for powers of numbers in 1656. Thomas Bayes was an important statistician from Tunbridge Wells; his theorem (of probability theory) is used for spam filters and Google's search.

Sir David N. Payne at the University of Southampton's Optoelectronics Research Centre invented the erbium-doped fibre amplifier, a type of optical amplifier, in the mid-1980s, which became essential for the internet. Henry Moseley at Oxford in 1913 discovered his Moseley's law of X-ray spectra of chemical elements that enabled him to be the first to assign the correct atomic number to elements in periodic table; he did not receive any Nobel Prize as it is not awarded posthumously (he was killed in 1915 at Gallipoli with the Royal Engineers). Carbon fibre was invented in 1963 at the RAE in Farnborough by a team led by William Watt. The Apollo LCG space-suit cooling system originated mostly from work done at RAE Farnborough in the early 1960s.

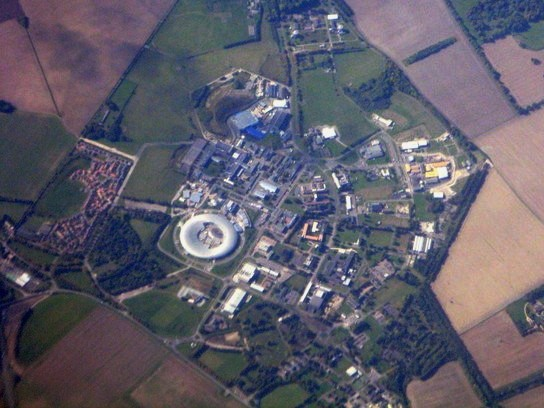
Harwell Science and Innovation Campus seen from the air in September 2015; the JANET academic computer network is headquartered there.

Donald Watts Davies invented packet switching in the late 1960s at the National Physical Laboratory in Teddington. Packet-switching was taken up by the Americans to form the ARPANET, the precursor to the Internet.

Surrey's Alec Reeves invented pulse-code modulation (PCM) in 1937 (at ITT's research laboratories in Paris), the standard for digital audio recordings.

Sir John Herschel, son of the astronomer, from Kent, invented the term photography in 1839, meaning light writing. and discovered the first photographic fixer, sodium thiosulphate, known as hypo, also in 1839.

GLEEP was Britain's first nuclear reactor, in August 1947 at the Atomic Energy Research Establishment (AERE) at Harwell, it would stay operational until 1990.

William Harvey of Folkestone, in Kent, discovered the circulation of blood. The Lilly Research Centre in Windlesham, Berkshire, part of Eli Lilly, developed Olanzapine in 1996 (for bipolar disorder, selling around $5bn worldwide annually). Beecham Research Laboratories at Brockham Park in 1959 discovered meticillin (or methicillin), the first semi-synthetic penicillin (beta-lactamase stable), deriving from their discovery in 1958 of 6-APA, the core constituent; the team, led by Prof George Rolinson, won the Mullard Award in 1971. Bipyridine compounds (Paraquat-Gramoxone and Diquat) were discovered for herbicide use in 1954 by William Boon at ICI's Plant Protection division at Jealott's Hill, being released onto the market in 1958. AZT/Retrovir (zidovudine) was first manufactured by Wellcome in 1987 in Kent; they also introduced Zovirax (aciclovir), and the naturally occurring digoxin, a cardiac glycoside. After a plane crashed near his house in Oxford in 1940, Sir Peter Medawar helped the injured pilot, and in the process discovered homograft rejection, leading to organ transplantation using azathioprine. Viagra (Sildenafil) was synthesized at Pfizer in Sandwich, Kent.

=== Industrial heritage ===
==== Transport and communications ====
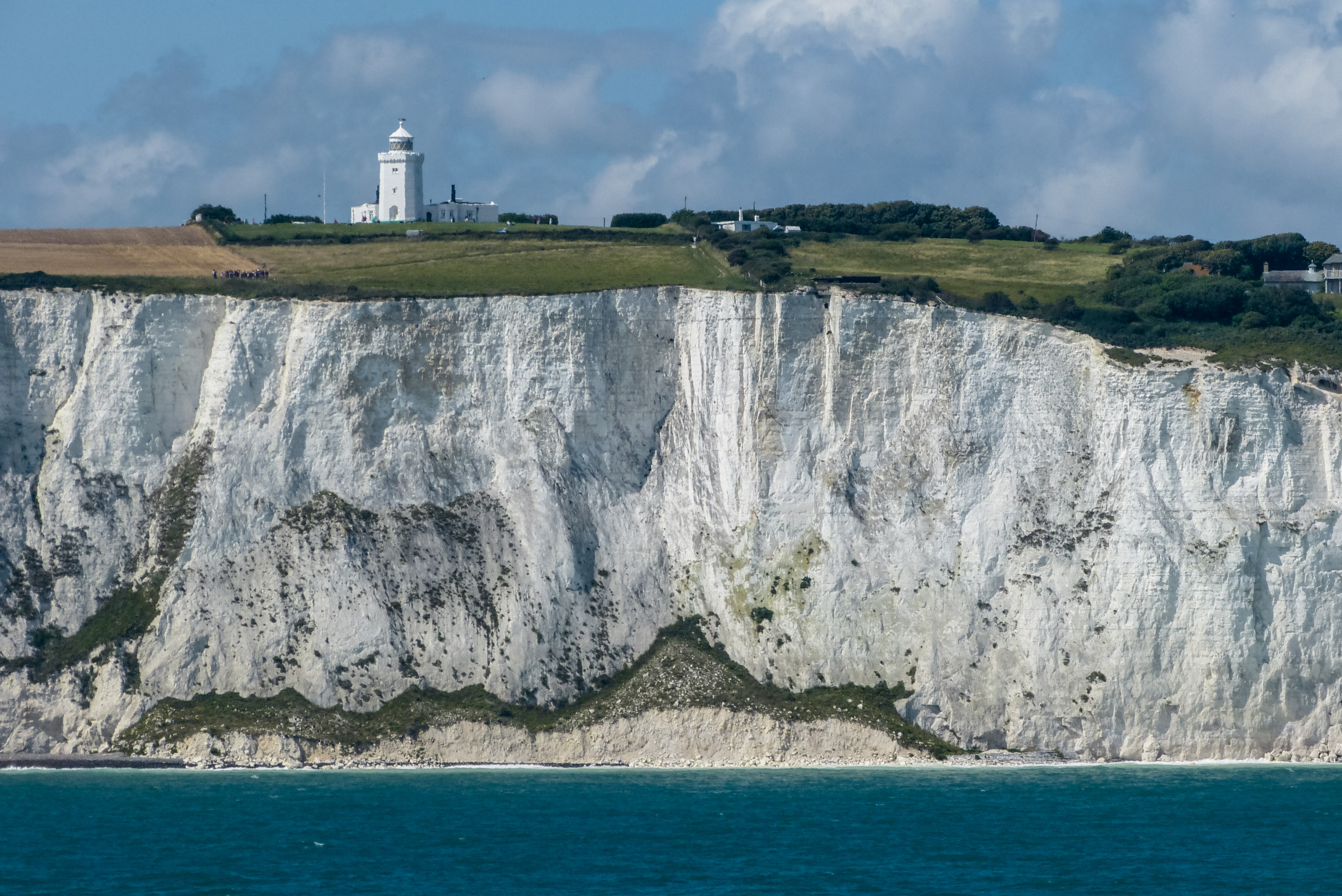
South Foreland Lighthouse on Dover cliffs

Sir Francis Pettit Smith of Kent invented the screw propeller.

On 3 May 1830 the world's first passenger train service, the Canterbury and Whitstable Railway (6 miles or 10 km) began. It was built by George Stephenson and hauled by the locomotive Invicta. It introduced the world's first railway season ticket in 1834.

Maidenhead Railway Bridge, known for its flat arch, was built in 1839 with 39-metre spans.

The Military Vehicles and Engineering Establishment, in Chertsey, developed Chobham armour.

On 12 April 1903, the world's first bus service was by Eastbourne Buses from Eastbourne railway station to Meads.

The world's first submarine telephone cable was laid between England and France in 1891 by HMTS Monarch, enabling London-Paris calls from April 1891. On 3 December 1992, Neil Papworth of Reading, an engineer from Sema Group Telecoms at Vodafone in Newbury, sent the world's first text message from his computer to an Orbitel 901 handset of Richard Jarvis, Vodafone's technical director.

The first public automatic telephone exchange in the UK was at Epsom telephone exchange from 18 May 1912. It was introduced as standard across the UK's 6,700 telephone exchanges in 1922, lasting for around 70 years; it could handle up to 500 lines. It used the Strowger design and was made by Automatic Telephone Manufacturing Company of Liverpool. The world's first automatic telephone exchange had opened in La Porte, Indiana in November 1892.

BritNed connects from the Isle of Grain in Medway to the TenneT network in the Netherlands.

UK-Belgium 5, laid in 1986 from Kent, was the world's first optical fibre submarine cable, and is 36 miles long.

ThrustSSC, the fastest car in the world in 1997, was built in Aldingbourne, West Sussex, by G-Force Engineering, designed by Ron Ayers, with further work done by the Defence Evaluation and Research Agency at Farnborough.

The BritNed 1000MW power-supply submarine cable from Isle of Grain to Rotterdam, was built in 2009. The HVDC Cross-Channel (2000MW) submarine cable was built in 1986. This is the world's highest-capacity submarine HVDC cable; it goes from France and lands near Folkestone, with the large transformer station (built by GEC) squeezed between the CTRL and the M20 in Aldington and Smeeth, made of eight 270 kV cables.

Aviation

On 16 October 1908 the British Army Aeroplane No 1, flown by the American Samuel Franklin Cody, was the first aircraft flown in the UK, at Farnborough; on 14 May 1909 he flew it for more than a mile. On 13 August 1909, his wife was the first woman in the UK to fly in a plane, also at Farnborough.

The first human airborne ejection seat firing took place on 24 July 1946 over Chalgrove Airfield, Oxfordshire, in a Meteor, piloted by Bernard Lynch; the first dummy ejection had been 10 May 1945 over RAF Oakley in west Buckinghamshire (today near the M40); on 13 March 1962, the first in-flight rocket-powered ejection took place by Peter Howard, an RAF doctor based at Farnborough's Institute of Aviation Medicine in Meteor WA364 at 250 ft over Chalgrove, with the rocket giving a maximum force of 16G. The Miles M.52, designed at Woodley Aerodrome in Berkshire by Miles Aircraft, was an advanced design of aircraft which had the innovation of the flying tail or all-moving tail also known as a stabilator; this would solve the problem of stability and aircraft control at supersonic speeds, and its design was taken wholesale into the American Bell X-1, the first supersonic aircraft.

The first Harrier aircraft XV738 flew on 28 December 1967; this was the first aircraft of the RAF to have a head-up display avionics system. The first two-seat Harrier XW174 flew on 24 April 1969, later crashing at Larkhill in June 1969. The British Aerospace Sea Harrier XZ450 first flew on 20 August 1978; on 4 May 1982 this aircraft was hit by anti-aircraft fire at Goose Green, killing the pilot with 800 Naval Air Squadron from HMS Hermes; the aircraft had no radar warning receiver (RWR), due to testing the Sea Eagle, so could not detect the Skyguard radar had locked on to it. It was destroyed with the Oerlikon GDF (35mm) of GADA 601; it was the first Sea Harrier lost in the Falklands campaign.

Royston Instruments of Byfleet developed the world's first multi-channel flight data recorders in 1965.

Although the Comet is generally accepted as the world's first production-run jet airliner, the first jet airliner ever built (individual) was a Nene-powered Vickers VC.1 Viking on 6 April 1948 from Wisley Airfield; the world's first turboprop airliner would fly from there on 16 July 1948 by Mutt Summers. In 1939 at Cowes (Northwood) John Godeck invented the plan position indicator method of radar display as most commonly known ever since; the site became Plessey Radar in 1965, and currently is run by BAE Systems. Sperry Gyroscope in Bracknell produced the guidance systems for Britain's 1960s space rockets.

==== Other industries ====
The Wealden iron industry in the Weald was the site of the first blast furnace in Britain in 1491, and produced much of Britain's cast iron until the 1770s.

Portsmouth Block Mills were the site of the world's first metal machine tools, built for the manufacture of wooden pulleys, invented by Henry Maudslay, and the site of the world's first industrial assembly line in 1803.

South Foreland Lighthouse on 8 December 1858 was the world's first lighthouse with electric light, with the first type of industrial electrical generator made by Frederick Hale Holmes, from work he had carried out with Floris Nollet of Belgium, and 36 permanent magnets. By 1880, of the ten lighthouses with electric light, five were in the UK. From the lighthouse in 1899, the first international radio broadcast to France was made. Zénobe Gramme of Belgium made a much better design in 1870 with self-excitation of magnets, and the first modern dynamo. North Foreland Lighthouse was the UK's last-staffed lighthouse until 1998.

Portland cement was developed in Northfleet, Kent, by William Aspdin, son of Joseph Aspdin. The development was to heat the ingredients to around 1450 °C, producing clinker. Previously, temperatures were taken to only 800 °C, which was not enough. The first ever cement kiln is still in Northfleet today in a cardboard factory. In the late 1800s, the rotary kiln made the process much more efficient. Concrete, effectively human-made stone, is the most widespread human-made material. 5% of all carbon emissions worldwide are from concrete production.

George Albert Smith developed the first colour film process, known as Kinemacolor, in 1906 at Southwick, West Sussex. George E. Davis from Slough, is the founding father of chemical engineering. Wiggins Teape, later ARJO Wiggins Fine Papers, had the largest paper research centre in Europe at Butlers Court in Beaconsfield; built in 1891 and vacated in 2009. Bentalls in Bracknell (now Fenwick since 2017) had the first point of sale terminal in Europe - the NCR 280 in 1973.

The National Fruit Collection is the largest collection of fruit trees in the world, at Brogdale, near Faversham in Kent. Scalextric was invented by Fred Francis in 1956, who founded Minimodels in Havant; initially the model cars had been clockwork; it was made from 1967 at Triang in Margate. The world's first Mars Bar was made in Slough in 1932; it was modelled on the Milky Way, popular at the time in the USA. Twix was introduced at Slough in 1967, with production moving to eastern France (Mars Chocolat France at Haguenau in Alsace) in 2005. The Ford GT40 was developed by Ford Advanced Vehicles at Slough in the mid-1960s.

== Geography ==
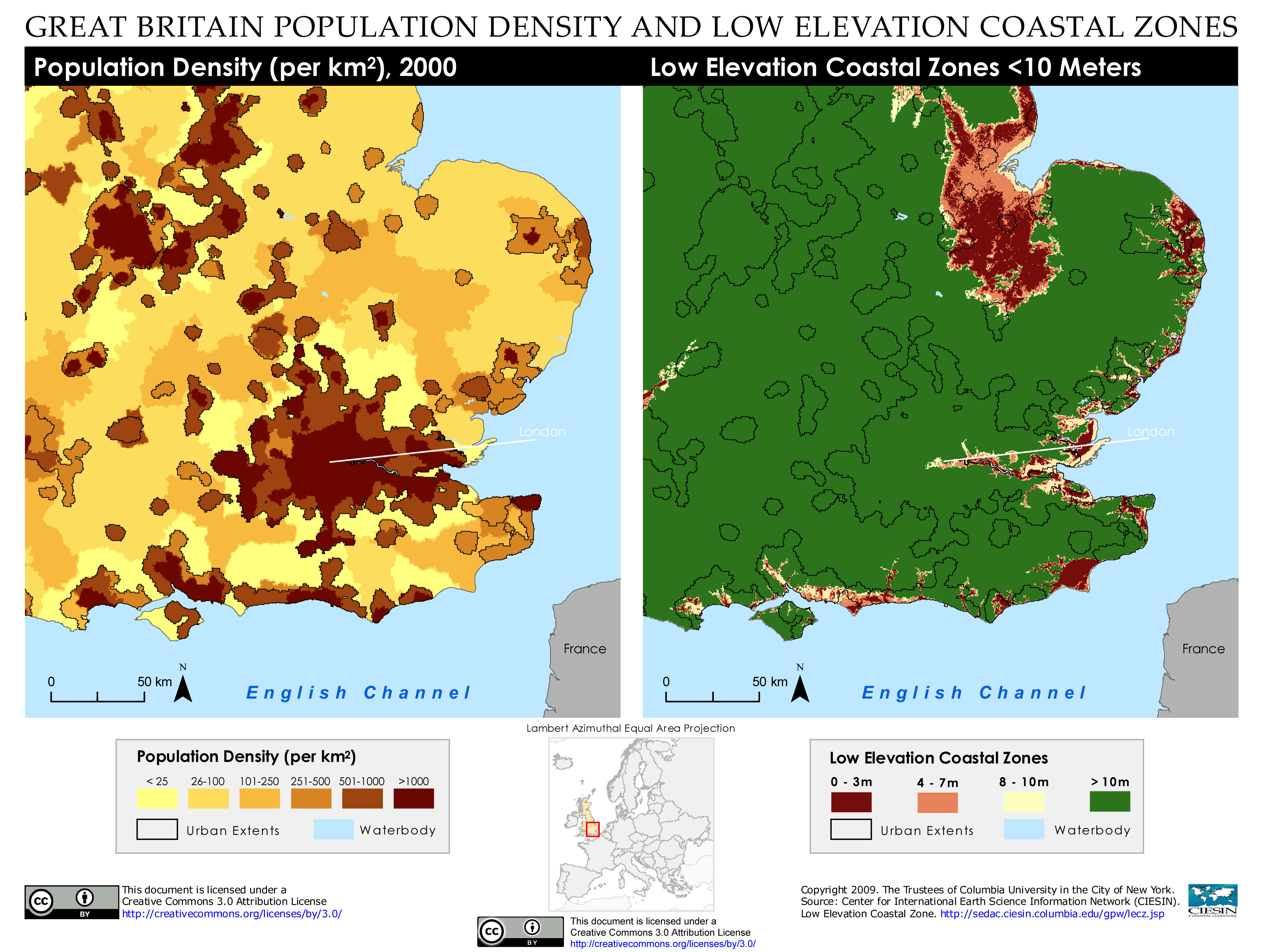
England population density and low elevation coastal zones. South East England is particularly vulnerable to sea level rise.

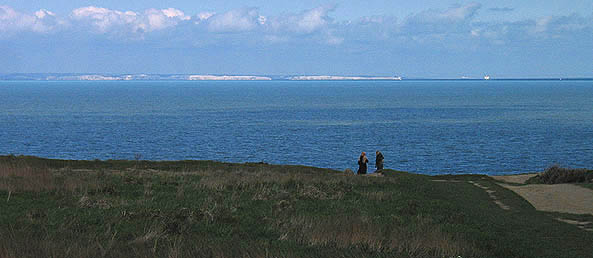
View of South East England coast from northern France

The highest point is Walbury Hill in Berkshire at 297 m (974 ft).

Britain's tallest native tree, according to The Tree Register in April 2015, is a 144-ft beech at Devil's Dyke in Newtimber Woods in West Sussex.

=== Settlements ===
Cities and towns in the region include Aldershot, Ashford, Aylesbury, Basingstoke, Bracknell, Brighton and Hove, Canterbury, Chichester, Crawley, Eastbourne, Farnborough, Gosport, Guildford, Hastings, High Wycombe, Margate, Maidstone, Medway, Milton Keynes, Newport, Oxford, Portsmouth, Ramsgate, Reading, Slough, Southampton, Winchester, Woking and Worthing.

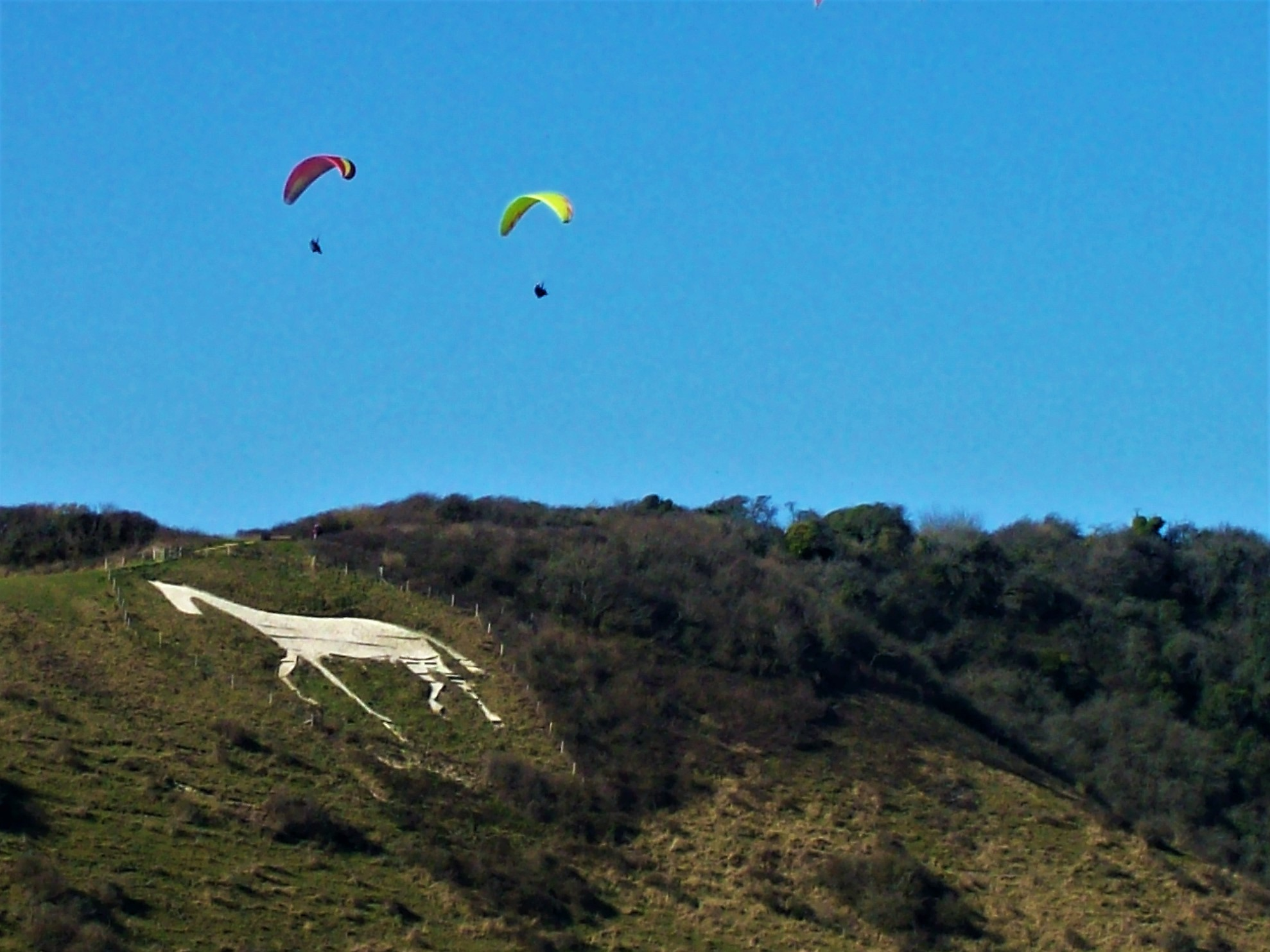
The Litlington White Horse situated in the South Downs

=== Historical boundaries ===
Until 1999, there was a south east Standard Statistical Region, which also included the counties of Bedfordshire, Greater London, Essex and Hertfordshire. The former south east Civil Defence Region covered the same area as the current official region.

=== Alternative definitions ===
In unofficial usage, the South East can refer to a varying area – sometimes only to London, Kent, East Sussex, West Sussex, and Surrey; but sometimes to an area corresponding to the former Standard Statistical Region. The South East is also occasionally used as a synonym for the home counties.

== Demographics ==

Population map.

Total South East England population (wikidata:Q48015) = 9,180,135 (2019 census)
(WD = Wikidata page)

[Hide/show county populations]
	South East England	pop.
1	Berkshire	917,762^{WD}
2	Buckinghamshire	817,263^{WD}
3	East Sussex	822,950^{WD}
4	Hampshire	1,857,824^{WD}
5	Isle of Wight	140,459^{WD}
6	Kent	1,855,842^{WD}
7	Oxfordshire	687,524^{WD}
8	Surrey	1,214,540^{WD}
9	West Sussex	882,676^{WD}

Population pyramid of the South East in 2020

UK- and foreign-born population pyramid of the South East in 2021

The population of the region at the 2011 census was 8,634,750 making it the most populous English region. The major conurbations of the region include South Hampshire (855,000), Brighton/Worthing/Littlehampton (474,000) and Reading (318,000). Settlements closer to London are part of the conurbation known as the Greater London Urban Area.

The South East has the highest percentage of people born outside of Britain other than London. According to the 2021 census, 78.8% of residents were White British, 7.1% Other White (inc. 0.8% Irish), 7.0% British Asian, 2.8% Mixed Race, 2.4% Black British, and 1.4% of other groups.

Population of the South East of England
Census	Population	Change
1801	962,350	
1811	1,072,563	▲10.3
1821	1,239,883	▲13.5
1831	1,378,755	▲10.1
1841	1,561,792	▲11.7
1851	1,687,558	▲7.5
1861	1,957,208	▲13.8
1871	2,226,880	▲12.1
1881	2,496,534	▲10.8
1891	2,776,842	▲10.1
1901	3,093,606	▲10.2
1911	3,472,091	▲10.9
1921	3,718,228	▲6.6
1931	3,995,122	▲6.9
1941^{a}	4,443,002	▲10.1
1951	4,976,340	▲10.7
1961	5,738,844	▲13.3
1971	6,718,771	▲14.6
1981	7,025,593	▲4.4
1991	7,677,641	▲8.5
2001	8,000,550	▲4.0
2011	8,634,750	▲7.9
2021	9,278,063	▲7.4

^{a} There was no census in 1941.

=== Cities and towns ===
List of largest cities and towns by population in South East England
City/town	Ceremonial county	Population	
City/town	Ceremonial county	City/town (2019)	Conurbation (2011)
Brighton and Hove	East Sussex	290,885	474,485
Milton Keynes	Buckinghamshire	269,457	229,941
Southampton	Hampshire	252,520	855,569
Portsmouth	Hampshire	214,905	(Note: Part of South Hampshire.)
Slough	Berkshire	164,455	163,777
Reading	Berkshire	161,780	318,014
Oxford	Oxfordshire	152,457	171,380
High Wycombe	Buckinghamshire	125,257	133,204
Basingstoke	Hampshire	113,776	107,642
Maidstone	Kent	113,137	107,627
Crawley	West Sussex	112,409	180,508
Worthing	West Sussex	110,570	(Note: Part of Brighton and Hove built-up area.)
Gillingham	Kent	104,157	243,931
Eastbourne	East Sussex	103,745	118,219

=== Ethnicity ===
Ethnic group	1981 estimates		1991		2001		2011		2021	
Ethnic group	Number	%	Number	%	Number	%	Number	%	Number	%
White: Total	6,691,186	97.2%	7,271,256	96.9%	7,608,989	95.10%	7,827,820	90.65%	8,009,380	86.2%
White: British	–	–	–	–	7,304,678	91.3%	7,358,998	85.22%	7,315,058	78.8%
White: Irish	–	–	–	–	82,405	1.02%	73,571	0.9%	78,219	0.8%
White: Irish Traveller/Gypsy	–	–	–	–	–	–	14,542	0.2%	16,748	0.2%
White: Roma	–	–	–	–	–	–	–	–	12,786	0.1%
White: Other	–	–	–	–	221,906	2.77%	380,709	4.4%	586,569	6.3%
Asian or Asian British: Total	–	–	149,198	2%	219,704	2.74%	452,042	5.23%	650,545	7%
Asian or Asian British: Indian	–	–	64,888	0.9%	89,219	1.1%	152,132	1.76%	241,537	2.6%
Asian or Asian British: Pakistani	–	–	35,946	0.5%	58,520		99,246		145,311	1.6%
Asian or Asian British: Bangladeshi	–	–	8,546	0.1%	15,358		27,951		39,881	0.4%
Asian or Asian British: Chinese	–	–	18,226	0.2%	33,089		53,061		64,329	0.7%
Asian or Asian British: Asian Other	–	–	21,592	0.3%	23,518		119,652	1.38%	159,487	1.7%
Black or Black British: Total	–	–	46,636	0.6%	56,914	0.71%	136,013	1.57%	221,584	2.4%
Black or Black British: African	–	–	9,588	0.1%	24,582		87,345		150,540	1.6%
Black or Black British: Caribbean	–	–	23,633	0.3%	27,452		34,225		43,523	0.5%
Black or Black British: Other	–	–	13,415	0.2%	4,880		14,443		27,521	0.3%
Mixed: Total	–	–	–	–	85,779	1.07%	167,764	1.94%	260,871	2.8%
Mixed: White and Caribbean	–	–	–	–	23,742	0.3%	45,980		62,087	0.7%
Mixed: White and African	–	–	–	–	9,493	0.1%	22,825		38,633	0.4%
Mixed: White and Asian	–	–	–	–	29,977	0.4%	58,764		88,106	0.9%
Mixed: Other Mixed	–	–	–	–	22,567	0.3%	40,195		72,045	0.8%
Other: Total	–	–	32,964	0.4%	29,259	0.36%	51,111	0.59%	135,683	1.4%
Other: Arab	–	–	–	–	–	–	19,363		29,574	0.3%
Other: Any other ethnic group	–	–	32,964	0.4%	29,259	0.36%	31,748	0.36%	106,109	1.1%
Ethnic minority: Total	191,229	2.8%	228,798	3.1%	391,656	4.9%	806,930	9.4%	1,268,683	13.8%
Total	6,882,415	100%	7,500,054	100%	8,000,645	100%	8,634,750	100%	9,278,063	100%

=== Religion ===
Religion in South East England
Religion	2021		2011		2001	
Religion	Number	%	Number	%	Number	%
Christianity	4,313,319	46.5%	5,160,128	59.8%	5,823,025	72.8%
Islam	309,067	3.3%	201,651	2.3%	108,725	1.4%
Hinduism	154,748	1.7%	92,499	1.1%	44,575	0.6%
Sikhism	74,348	0.8%	54,941	0.6%	37,735	0.5%
Buddhism	54,433	0.6%	43,946	0.5%	22,005	0.3%
Judaism	18,682	0.2%	17,761	0.2%	19,037	0.2%
Other religion	54,098	0.6%	39,672	0.5%	28,668	0.4%
No religion	3,733,094	40.2%	2,388,286	27.7%	1,319,979	16.5%
Religion not stated	566,279	6.1%	635,866	7.4%	596,896	7.5%
Total population	9,278,068	100%	8,634,750	100%	8,000,645	100%

=== Place of Birth ===
This table includes place of birth in South East England for 2021 census:

#	Country	Number
1	England	7,579,638
2	India	132,604
3	Scotland	118,026
4	Poland	112,413
5	Wales	85,204
6	Romania	74,697
7	South Africa	65,922
8	Pakistan	60,614
9	Republic of Ireland	51,806
10	Germany	50,158
11	United States	35,827
12	Italy	33,966
13	Nepal	33,892
14	Northern Ireland	32,641
15	Nigeria	32,468
16	Philippines	28,286
17	Zimbabwe	28,102
18	China	26,066
19	France	25,592
20	Portugal	25,582

== Governance and politics ==
South East England is an official region for statistical and strategic planning purposes, but is not served by any directly elected regional government. From 1998 to 2010 local councils sent to the voluntary South East England Regional Assembly, based in Guildford. Delegates met six times a year and it was responsible for the South East England Development Agency, a project which oversaw investment projects in the region. It was abolished on 31 March 2009 and replaced with South East England Councils in Kingston upon Thames. The region is divided into several local council areas, most composed of two-tiered councils (the tiers are county councils and district councils) and unitary authorities:

Map	Ceremonial county	Shire county / unitary	Districts
	Berkshire	a) West Berkshire U.A.	
	Berkshire	b) Reading U.A.	
	Berkshire	c) Wokingham U.A.	
	Berkshire	d) Bracknell Forest U.A.	
	Berkshire	e) Windsor and Maidenhead U.A.	
	Berkshire	f) Slough U.A.	
	Buckinghamshire	Buckinghamshire U.A.	
	Buckinghamshire	Milton Keynes U.A.	
	East Sussex	East Sussex	a) Hastings, b) Rother, c) Wealden, d) Eastbourne, e) Lewes
	East Sussex	Brighton & Hove U.A.	
	Hampshire	Hampshire	a) Fareham, b) Gosport, c) Winchester, d) Havant, e) East Hampshire, f) Hart, g) Rushmoor, h) Basingstoke and Deane, i) Test Valley, j) Eastleigh, k) New Forest
	Hampshire	Southampton U.A.	
	Hampshire	Portsmouth U.A.	
Isle of Wight
	Kent	Kent	a) Dartford, b) Gravesham, c) Sevenoaks, d) Tonbridge and Malling, e) Tunbridge Wells, f) Maidstone, g) Swale, h) Ashford, i) Folkestone and Hythe, j) Canterbury, k) Dover, l) Thanet
	Kent	Medway U.A.	
	Oxfordshire		a) Oxford, b) Cherwell, c) South Oxfordshire, d) Vale of White Horse, e) West Oxfordshire
	Surrey		a) Spelthorne, b) Runnymede, c) Surrey Heath, d) Woking, e) Elmbridge, f) Guildford, g) Waverley, h) Mole Valley, i) Reigate and Banstead, j) Tandridge, k) Epsom and Ewell
	West Sussex		a) Worthing, b) Arun, c) Chichester, d) Horsham, e) Crawley, f) Mid Sussex, g) Adur

=== Westminster seats ===
General election results in 2017

Although traditionally South East of England has been the most Conservative voting region of Britain in terms of both seats and votes, with the recent 2024 election it has become split almost evenly between Labour, Conservative, and Liberal Democrats. Before 2024, there had already been areas the non-Conservative centers: for example Oxford, Slough and Southampton Test for Labour, and Brighton Pavilion for the Green Party. Currently, out of 91 parliamentary seats, Labour holds 36, the Conservatives 30, and the Liberal Democrats 24.

Date of election	Electorate	Con	Lab	Lib Dem	Reform/UKIP	Green	Others	Lead
4 July 2024	4,351,000	30.6%	24.5%	21.9%	14.0%	6.9%	2.1%	6.5%
12 December 2019	4,652,810	54.0%	22.1%	18.2%	0.2%	3.9%	1.5%	31.9%
8 June 2017	4,635,741	54.8%	28.7%	10.6%	2.3%	3.1%	0.5%	26.1%
7 May 2015	4,394,400	50.8%	18.3%	9.4%	14.7%	5.2%	1.5%	32.5%
6 May 2010	4,294,240	49.9%	16.2%	26.2%	4.1%	1.4%	2.2%	23.7%
5 May 2005	3,901,598	45.0%	24.4%	25.4%	3.1%	1.3%	0.8%	19.6%
7 June 2001	5,187,711	42.6%	31.7%	21.6%	4.1%			10.9%
1 May 1997	4,341,608	41.9%	29.1%	23.3%	5.7%			12.8%
9 April 1992	6,455,871	54.5%	20.8%	23.3%	1.4%			31.2%
11 July 1987	6,087,487	55.6%	16.8%	27.2%	0.5%			28.4%
9 June 1983	9,101,444	50.5%	21.1%.	27.1%	1.0%			23.4%

=== Eurostat NUTS ===
In the Eurostat Nomenclature of Territorial Units for Statistics (NUTS), South East England is a level-1 NUTS region, coded "UKJ", which is subdivided as follows:

How the region voted in the 2016 European referendum

NUTS 1	Code	NUTS 2	Code	NUTS 3	Code
South East England	UKJ	Berkshire, Buckinghamshire, and Oxfordshire	UKJ1	Berkshire	UKJ11
		Berkshire, Buckinghamshire, and Oxfordshire	UKJ1	City of Milton Keynes	UKJ12
		Berkshire, Buckinghamshire, and Oxfordshire	UKJ1	Buckinghamshire Council (UA)	UKJ13
		Berkshire, Buckinghamshire, and Oxfordshire	UKJ1	Oxfordshire	UKJ14
		Surrey, East and West Sussex	UKJ2	Brighton and Hove	UKJ21
		Surrey, East and West Sussex	UKJ2	East Sussex CC	UKJ22
		Surrey, East and West Sussex	UKJ2	West Surrey (Elmbridge, Guildford, Runnymede, Spelthorne, Surrey Heath, Waverley and Woking)	UKJ25
		Surrey, East and West Sussex	UKJ2	East Surrey (Epsom and Ewell, Mole Valley, Reigate and Banstead and Tandridge)	UKJ26
		Surrey, East and West Sussex	UKJ2	West Sussex (South West) - (Adur, Arun, Chichester and Worthing)	UKJ27
		Surrey, East and West Sussex	UKJ2	West Sussex (North East) - (Crawley, Horsham and Mid Sussex)	UKJ28
		Hampshire and Isle of Wight	UKJ3	Portsmouth	UKJ31
		Hampshire and Isle of Wight	UKJ3	Southampton	UKJ32
		Hampshire and Isle of Wight	UKJ3	Isle of Wight	UKJ34
		Hampshire and Isle of Wight	UKJ3	South Hampshire (Eastleigh, Fareham, Gosport and Havant)	UKJ35
		Hampshire and Isle of Wight	UKJ3	Central Hampshire (East Hampshire, New Forest, Test Valley and Winchester)	UKJ36
		Hampshire and Isle of Wight	UKJ3	North Hampshire (Basingstoke and Deane, Hart and Rushmoor)	UKJ37
		Kent	UKJ4	Medway	UKJ41
		Kent	UKJ4	Kent Thames Gateway (Dartford, Gravesham and Swale)	UKJ43
		Kent	UKJ4	East Kent (Canterbury, Dover, Folkestone and Hythe and Thanet)	UKJ44
		Kent	UKJ4	Mid Kent (Ashford and Maidstone)	UKJ45
		Kent	UKJ4	West Kent (Sevenoaks, Tonbridge and Malling and Tunbridge Wells)	UKJ46

== Education ==
=== Schools ===
Buckinghamshire, Medway and Kent, and Slough have an almost completely selective education system – not just a few grammar schools as other English areas may have – with secondary modern schools as the alternative. Kent has 33 grammar schools, Buckinghamshire 13, Medway 6 and Slough 4. The other areas are comprehensive. The top thirty schools at A level are almost exclusively selective schools; one or two are sixth form colleges. However, the results for each county as a whole are not always directly related to the number of grammar schools, as Kent and Medway perform below average at A-level. The King's School, Canterbury claims to be oldest in England: 597 AD. Herschel Grammar School in Slough is the most oversubscribed school in England, with 14 people per place, Langley Grammar School in Slough is next with 13 per place, then Burnham Grammar School.

508,000 in the region are at state secondary schools (the highest in England) with 101,000 in Kent (the highest in England for a county and completely selective) then 70,000 in Hampshire, 60,000 in Surrey, 45,000 in West Sussex, 36,000 in Oxfordshire, 35,000 in Buckinghamshire. The lowest is 6,000 at Bracknell Forest, then Reading with about 6,000. Of all regions, the South-East has the greatest percentage that attend a grammar school: 12%; the next highest is the South-West with 6%. The most-educated people (NQF level 4 or above) in the region live in Elmbridge (51%), then Waverley, and Epsom and Ewell; 33% of people are at this level for the South-East, only second to London at 40%.

The region has the highest number of sixth formers, outside of London, in England; the highest number is in Kent, the highest for England, then Buckinghamshire (also completely selective), then Surrey. For state school pupils, there is patchy STEM participation. Hampshire has the most passing STEM subjects in England and in the region, followed by Kent, Surrey and Buckinghamshire. For STEM subjects, Portsmouth is lowest by some distance (6 people passed A level Chemistry) and is almost the worst in England. Southampton also gets low STEM subject results. Bracknell Forest gets low STEM results, for its economic prosperity, but does not include private schools.

For languages, the best is Kent: the county achieves the most A-level language passes in England, although Hampshire is a close second. Both counties get more German A level passes than the whole of North East England. Buckinghamshire and Surrey have high language A-level passes. Hampshire gets the most A-level passes in England (27,500), again more than North-East England (25,000). Although Hampshire is the best at languages, Portsmouth gets the fewest language passes in the region, and some of the lowest in England, with four French A levels, and has only 500 A level passes in total; next lowest are Slough, Bracknell Forest, and Southampton.

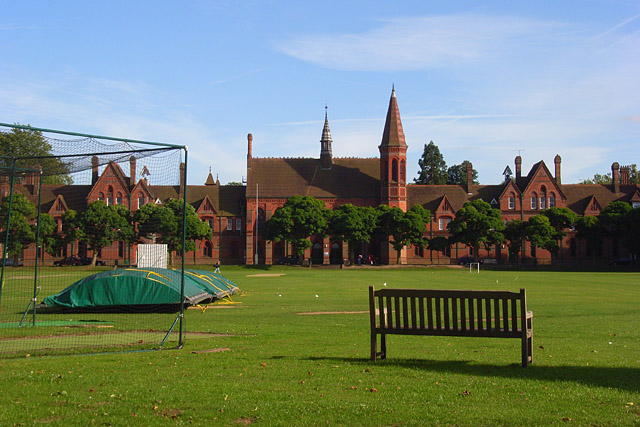
Reading School often gets the highest percentage of Oxbridge acceptances for a state school in England.

Reading School, a grammar, is the state school that gets the highest percentage (23%) into Oxbridge in 2010, behind 10 independents, and is also the oldest existing state grammar school in England; above it in the region, of the independent schools, are Magdalen College School, Oxford (32%), Guildford High School (26%) and Wycombe Abbey (25%). The Kendrick School, also in Reading, gets the 4th highest state school acceptance percentage to Oxbridge (18%) and the second highest in England outside of two grammar schools in London. Of the 25 state schools in the top 100 schools getting to Oxbridge, 7 are from the region. Many people from the north of East Sussex go to Kent's grammars; some people on the London edge of Surrey attend grammars in Kingston upon Thames; and Buckingham's two grammars attract people from nearby Milton Keynes; Buckinghamshire's grammar schools get some of best admissions to Oxbridge in the UK. Surrey has twice as many acceptances into Oxbridge as the whole of Wales; acceptances to Oxbridge are concentrated in 10 counties in the South-East.

1% of those at school in the South-East gained no GCSE passes in 2010; Portsmouth was most with 2.5%, and Windsor and Maidenhead had the lowest with 0.2%. For school free school meals, the region has the lowest percentage in England with 7.2%; the highest percentage is Southampton with 17%, and the lowest is Wokingham with 3.5% (the second lowest in England after Rutland); Buckinghamshire is 4.3%, then Bracknell Forest and Surrey are 4.9%. For truancy, the highest is South Bucks at 7.0, then Canterbury 7.0, Portsmouth 6.9, Thanet 6.9, Southampton 6.4, and Rushmoor 6.1. The lowest truancy percentages are for Tandridge 2.5, Windsor & Maidenhead 2.5, and Slough 2.5.

At GCSE, the area in the South East (and England) with the highest results is consistently Buckinghamshire. Berkshire is split into unitary authorities, and Wokingham, Windsor and Slough have the next best GCSE results. All of Berkshire's unitary authorities have results above the England average, with West Berkshire considerably above average. Schools in Surrey and Hampshire also have consistently good GCSE results, and they are above average in Oxfordshire, West Sussex, Kent, Medway, and East Sussex. There are a small number of districts where results are significantly below average including the unitary authorities of Portsmouth (one of the lowest LEAs in the country), the Isle of Wight, Southampton, Brighton, and the districts of Oxford in Oxfordshire, Adur in West Sussex and Hastings in East Sussex.

There are forty-nine FE colleges in the region. The two main FE colleges are Northbrook College in Sussex and Basingstoke College of Technology in Hampshire. Oxfordshire and Buckinghamshire share an LSC (which fund FE colleges), and Sussex has a combined LSC. The region's LSC office was in Reading, looking after five areas.

=== Universities ===
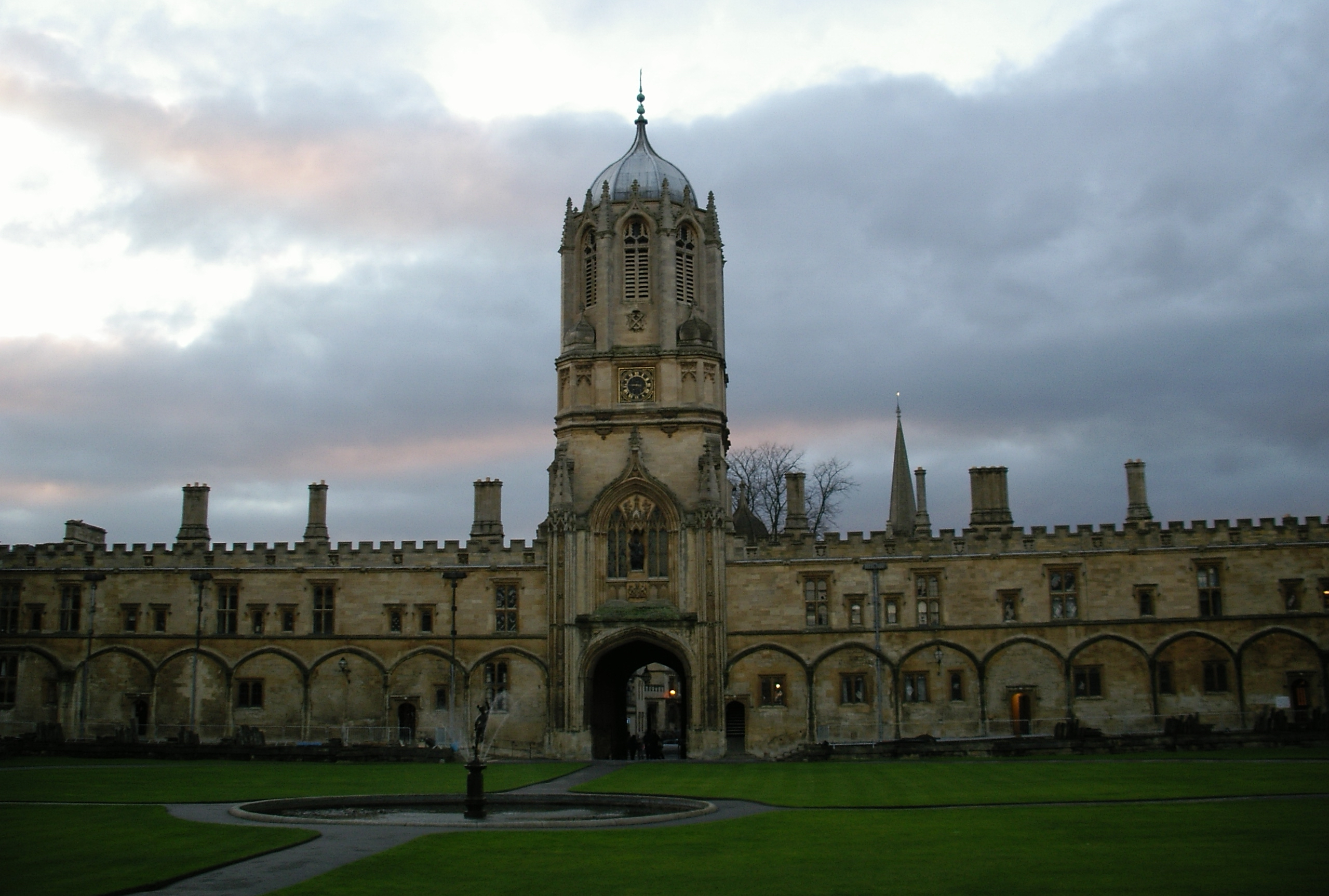
Tom Tower of Christ Church, Oxford; in 1920, the University of Oxford was the first in the UK to award degrees to women.

The best known university in the region is the University of Oxford, famous for its academic achievements, and also for its ornate colleges and its rowing crews on the Thames. It was ranked the fourth best university in the world by the Times Higher Education Supplement in 2013.

Other universities include:

- University of Brighton, Brighton and Eastbourne
- University of Buckingham, Buckingham
- Buckinghamshire New University, High Wycombe, Aylesbury, Uxbridge and Great Missenden
- Canterbury Christ Church University, Canterbury, Medway towns and Tunbridge Wells
- University of Chichester, Chichester and Bognor Regis
- University of Kent, Canterbury
- The University of Law, Guildford (as well as eight other UK campuses outside South East England)
- University of Reading, Reading, Henley-on-Thames
- The Open University, Milton Keynes
- Oxford Brookes University, Oxford
- University of Portsmouth, Portsmouth
- Royal Holloway, University of London, Egham
- Solent University, Southampton
- University of Southampton, Southampton
- University of Surrey, Guildford
- University of Sussex, Brighton
- University of Winchester, Winchester

By total HEFCE funding, the biggest university is the Open University, followed by Oxford University. The Open and Oxford each receive around three times as much funding as any other university in the region, and Oxford receives the largest research grant in England (as of 2009). The University of Southampton gets the third largest amount of funding, with the next largest research grant, one of the largest in England. Other universities with a large research grant are Reading, Sussex and Surrey. Oxford gets twice as much total income (around £700 million) as the next largest, Southampton. Surrey and Reading get the next largest total income.

Oxford and Southampton have the largest numbers of students, followed by Brighton. Of total students in the region, around 45% are from the region and 35% from other regions. Of full-time first degree students in the region, over 35% are from the region, 15% are from London, and 10% each are from the East of England and the South-West; in total, around 70% are from the south of England. Very few are from the North-East or Scotland. Around 35% of the region's native students stay in the region, with 15% going to London and over 10% going to the South-West. In general, for other regions of the UK, the South-East's students are more prepared to study in other regions than those regions' students are prepared to study in the South-East. Once they graduate, over 50% stay in the South-East, with 25% going to London, around 5% going to the East of England, and around 10% going to the South-West; around 90% stay in the south of England.

== Economy ==
Overall, the South East of England is a very prosperous area with the second largest regional economy in the UK (after London), valued at £177 billion in 2006. GDP per capita in 2007 was estimated at £22,624, compared with a UK average of £19,956, making South East England the second richest region per capita, behind London. However prosperity varies significantly across the region and despite its image of wealth there are large pockets of deprivation. GDP per capita in Berkshire and Milton Keynes is more than twice that of East Sussex and the Isle of Wight.

The region's Manufacturing Advisory Service is on the A30 in Hook, north Hampshire The UKTI service for the region is on Victory Park in Whiteley, off junction 9 of the M27, opposite the Solent Hotel.

The South East Coast Ambulance Service has three headquarters, one each for Kent, Surrey and Sussex. These are on the B2163 at Coxheath (for Kent), on the A217 at Banstead (for Surrey), and on the A277 in Lewes (for Sussex). The South Central Ambulance Service is headquartered on the B4100 next to Bicester Town railway station, with offices at Otterbourne, Hampshire and Wokingham. The charity-funded air ambulances are Kent Air Ambulance at Marden, Kent; Hampshire & Isle of Wight Air Ambulance at Thruxton, Hampshire; Surrey and Sussex Air Ambulance at Dunsfold Aerodrome, Surrey; and the Thames Valley Air Ambulance at RAF Benson.

Many high technology companies are located near the M3 in Surrey and the M4 in Berkshire. Sun Microsystems had their UK base in Blackwater near Camberley until 2009. Microsoft and Oracle have their UK headquarters next door to each other in Reading (Wokingham borough), as do the Yell Group and Logica (near junction 11 of the M4). The Gatwick Diamond is also a hub for hi-tech industry, centred at Gatwick Airport with Epsom to the north and Burgess Hill to the south. The largest company, by turnover, in the South East is Vodafone, followed by Ineos.

South-East Region	GDP €	GDP per capita € (2013)
Berkshire	€45.2 bn	€51,500 (includes Borough of Reading)
Buckinghamshire	€18.6 bn	€36,100 (excludes City of Milton Keynes UA)
Oxfordshire	€25.3 bn	€38,000
Milton Keynes	€12.8 bn	€50,300
Brighton & Hove	€8.4 bn	€30,400
East Sussex CC	€11.1 bn	€20,800
Surrey	€46.6 bn	€40,500
West Sussex	€24.6 bn	€32,000
Portsmouth	€6.8 bn	€33,000
Southampton	€7.4 bn	€30,700
Hampshire CC	€44.6 bn	€33,400 (excludes Portsmouth and Southampton)
Isle of Wight	€2.8 bn	€20,300
Medway	€5.6 bn	€20,900
Kent CC	€38.6 bn	€25,900
TOTAL	€300.5 bn	€34.200

== Transport ==
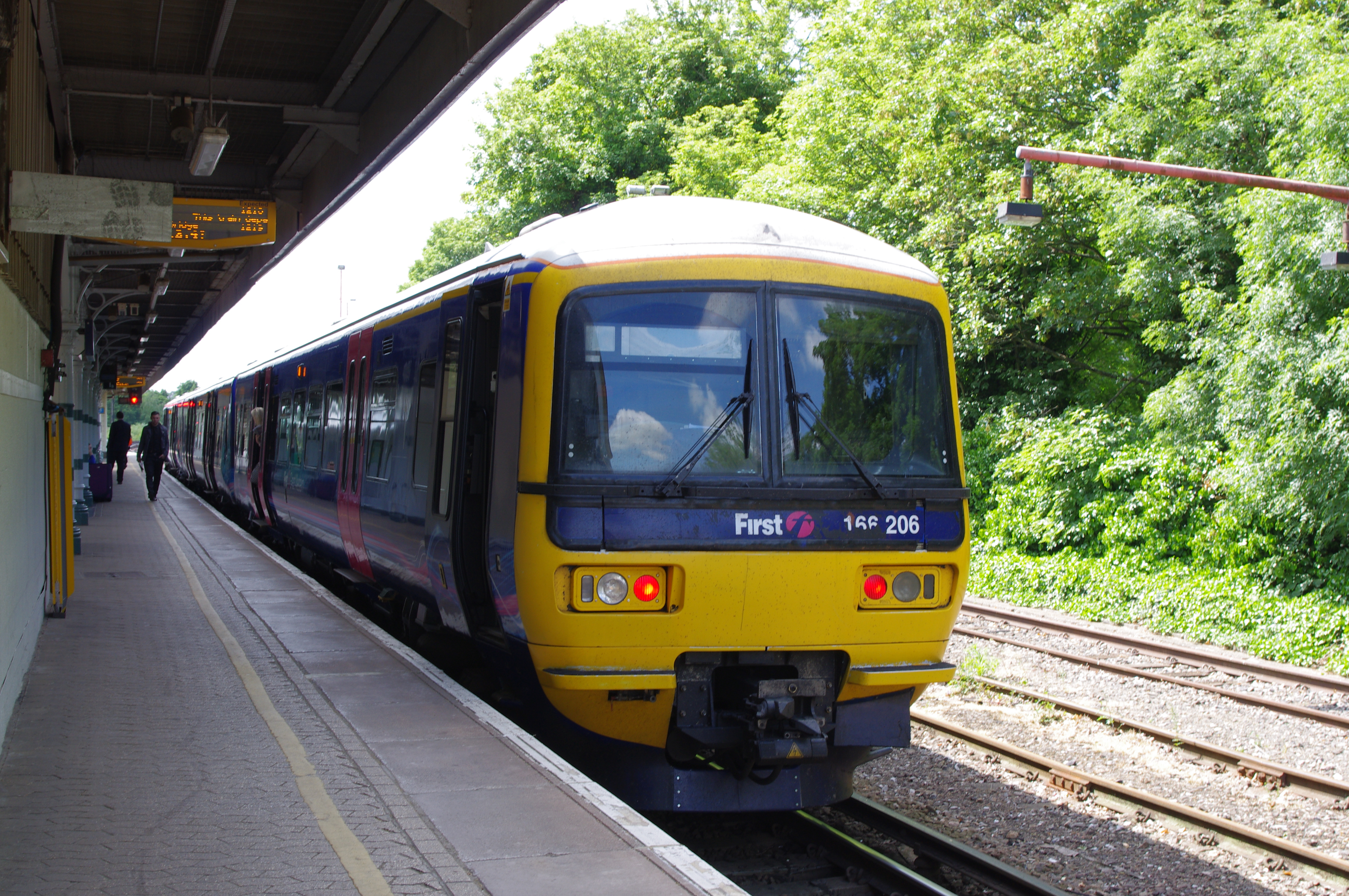
Redhill with the diesel Class 166 service run by First Great Western to Reading as the line has not got the Third rail electrification fully installed on the North Downs Line

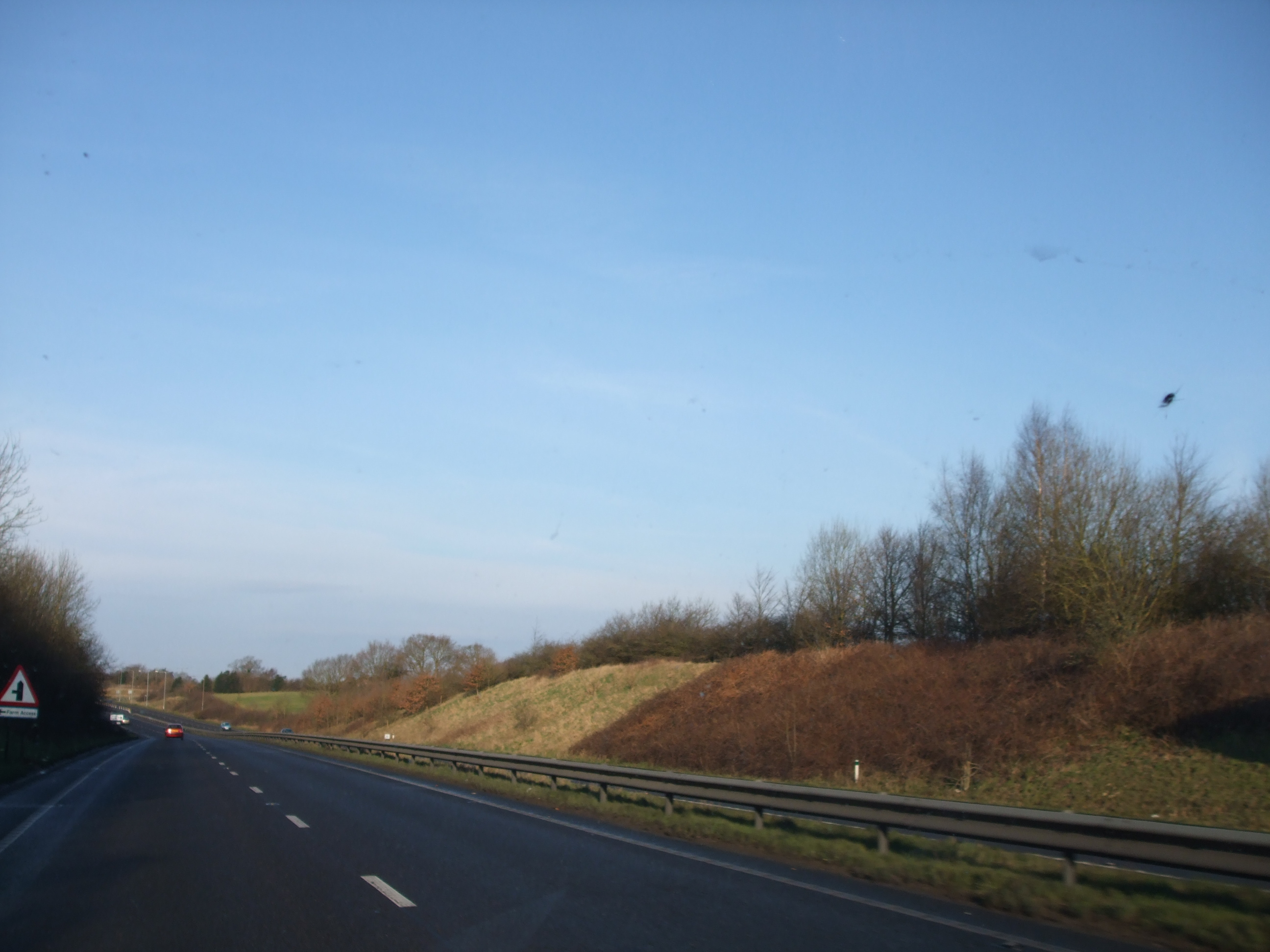
Most main routes in the region are radials from London. Shown here is the A21. It is one of the major north–south routes connecting London and commuter towns and the coast.

Rail transport infrastructure map - UK - South East England

The main road transport routes are along the M1 through Buckinghamshire; the M40 through Buckinghamshire and Oxfordshire; the M4 through Berkshire and Buckinghamshire; the M2 motorway/A2 and M20 through Kent; the M23 through Surrey and West Sussex; the M3 through Surrey and Hampshire. All these routes connect to the M25, which runs near to and occasionally through the region's border with Greater London.

The A34 provides a north–south road link through Oxfordshire, Berkshire and Hampshire. The east–west corridor through the south of the region is provided by the A27 and the M27.

The main intercontinental airport is Gatwick Airport, with regional airports at Kent International Airport (Ramsgate), Shoreham Airport and Southampton Airport. Heathrow Airport is in Greater London but also serves (and is serviced by) the South East region.

The Great Western Main Line passes through Berkshire, Oxfordshire and southern Buckinghamshire. The South Eastern Main Line and High Speed 1 pass through Kent; the latter connects to the Channel Tunnel. The Brighton Main Line passes through Surrey and West Sussex. The North Downs Line runs from Berkshire then through Surrey to connect with Sussex and Kent. The West Coast Main Line passes through northern Buckinghamshire. The Chiltern Main Line is a major commuter line between Birmingham and London passing through central Buckinghamshire and Oxfordshire. The Port of Dover and the port at Folkestone have many ferry services to France and though none currently run to Belgium.

As part of the transport planning system the Regional Assembly is under statutory requirement to produce a Regional Transport Strategy (RTS) to provide long term planning for transport in the region. This involves region wide transport schemes such as those carried out by the Highways Agency and Network Rail. Within the region the local transport authorities carry out transport planning through the use of a Local Transport Plan (LTP) which outlines their strategies, policies and implementation programme.

The most recent LTP is that for the period 2006–11. In the South East region the following transport authorities have published their LTP online: Bracknell Forest U.A., Brighton & Hove U.A., Buckinghamshire, East Sussex, Hampshire, Isle of Wight, Kent, Medway U.A., Milton Keynes U.A., Oxfordshire, Portsmouth U.A., Reading U.A., Slough U.A., Southampton U.A., Surrey, Windsor and Maidenhead U.A., Wokingham U.A. and West Sussex.

== Economic activity by county ==
=== Berkshire ===
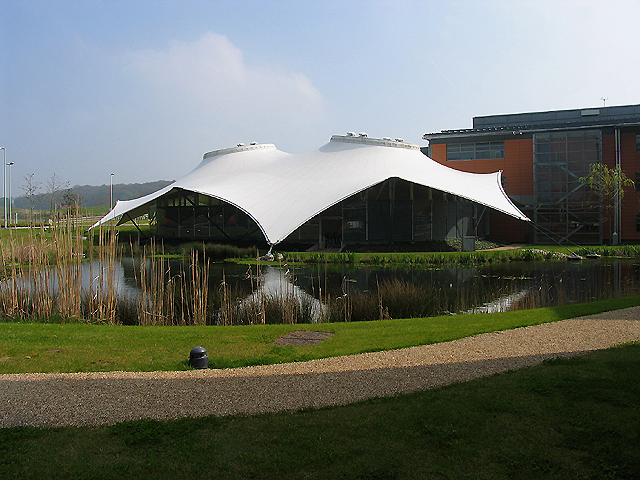
Vodafone HQ north of Newbury; it arrived as Racal-Vodafone in 1983, when Bayer also arrived; Vodafone is the world's second-biggest mobile phone company (the world's largest privately owned) with £40 billion of revenue and 464 million customers, and profits of £11bn; it has around 19M UK customers, and by value makes up about 5% of the FTSE 100.

Companies in Berkshire essentially follow the M4 corridor. In Theale are Nvidia UK (components for smartphones), The Range, Bathstore, and Plumb Center. SPP Pumps (owned by Kirloskar Group) is at the Arlington Business Park; on the same estate PepsiCo is next to the GWML railway. Porsche Cars Great Britain is in Calcot, Tilehurst, west of Reading near Theale Interchange. Harley-Davidson UK is in Pangbourne. Vodafone, and High and Mighty are based in Newbury; Bayer UK (Aspirin, Rennie and Alka-Seltzer) is to the west; National Instruments UK is to the east off the A4 on the Newbury Business Park, and Quantel was off the A4 and is now Snell (former Snell & Wilcox, previously in Lower Earley), an important video technology company, near Aricent UK.

The Atomic Weapons Establishment is in Aldermaston on the Hampshire boundary. The Motor Insurance Repair Research Centre and Xtrac Limited are at Thatcham. The Royal School of Military Survey is in Hermitage. East of the A34, north of the M4, at Compton since 1992 is the UK HQ of Baxter Healthcare, part of a global company which is working on a vaccine for H1N1, and next door is the Institute for Animal Health, which also researches H1N1.

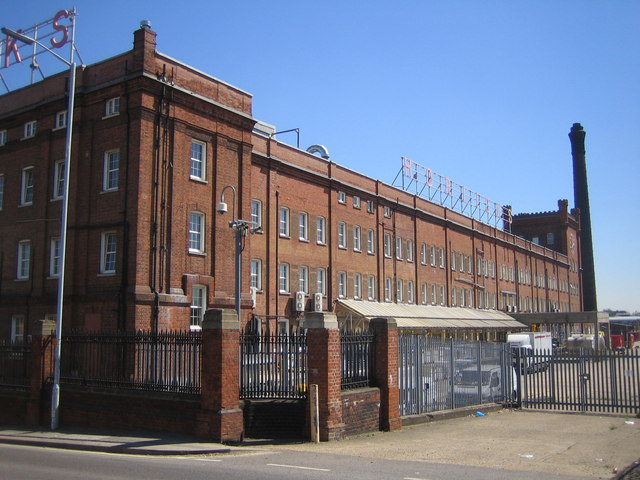
Horlicks factory in Slough; GSK Slough makes 14,000 tonnes a year.

Retriever Sports, on the Mill Street Ind Est near Slough railway station, is the world's largest manufacturer of darts equipment. Mars Limited has a large chocolate factory, run under the name of Effem Holdings Ltd, also in Slough on the enormous Slough Trading Estate which makes 3m Mars bars a day; nearby is Johnson Controls UK (car seats), and ICI Paints, Polyfilla, and Dulux. Horlicks is made by GSK there. Oki UK (desktop printers) are based next to Mars. Honda UK, Citroën UK, Fiat UK, Douwe Egberts UK (and its owner Sara Lee UK), BlackBerry UK, Black & Decker Europe, Amazon UK, Ingres UK, Telefónica O2 Europe UK and Reckitt Benckiser are also in Slough.

Toyota Material Handling UK (fork lifts) is next door to Slough Heat and Power station. Lonza UK makes biopharmaceuticals (monoclonal antibodies) on the A4. Honda Motor Europe is at the Langley Roundabout (A4/B470) of the M4 at Brands Hill, part of Colnbrook with Poyle, and near the Queen Mother Reservoir; on the opposite side of the M4 in Langley (Slough borough) is Royal Mail's Heathrow Worldwide Distribution Centre, and next door is Pentax Ricoh Imaging UK, next to Langley's leisure centre.

Hovis, Ben & Jerry's (Unilever), FM Global UK (insurance), and Morgan Crucible, are in Windsor; Nintendo UK is next to the Royal Mews Riding School. Centrica is in Dedworth, next to Windsor Racecourse. Groupe SEB UK (owner of Krups, Moulinex, Rowenta, and Tefal) is next to Windsor & Eton Riverside railway station and near the castle (previously next to Langley railway station until 2012). CA Technologies UK is at Ditton Park in Datchet, home of the former Radio Research Station until 1979, which discovered the ionosphere in the 1920s. Ledco, near B3020/A329 junction in Sunninghill and Ascot, is the UK distributor of LED Lenser torches, made by Zweibrüder Optoelectronics. Hitachi, Corel UK, NSK Europe (off the A308 to the north), Weight Watchers UK (next to Desborough School) and the Rank Group (leisure) are in Maidenhead.

Further east on the A404(M) is McGraw-Hill UK in Cox Green; other the side of the A404(M) at the Cox Green Interchange (9A), GSK makes Sensodyne, Corsodyl, Aquafresh, and Macleans; Volvo Cars UK are at Scandinavia House (in Marlow from 1986 to 2012) next to GSK; Nortel UK left in 2009. Sanofi Pasteur MSD UK (vaccines) is based next to the Maidenhead council offices. Initial Washrooms Solutions is next to the railway station and on the other side of A308 is Hutchison 3G UK; on the other side of the railway is the Rank Group at the A308 roundabout, in Braywick. Adobe Systems have their European HQ on the A4, south of the B4447 roundabout, next to a Sainsbury's. Hanson UK is based at the A4/A308 roundabout; Hitachi Europe (with Maxell Europe) is off the A4094 on the northern outskirts towards Cookham at Whitebrook Park, with DS Smith, at the former Formica Research Centre. Avery Dennison UK are based to the north off the A308 at Furze Platt.

Abbott Laboratories UK (pharmaceuticals) are based on the Vanwall Business Park; nearby is Costain, Pfizer Consumer Healthcare UK (Centrum multivitamins); Toys "R" Us UK and Mattel UK are opposite each other, with Compuware UK. McNeil Products (Benylin, Benadryl, Daktarin, Sudafed and Calpol) is at Foundation Park, next to the Great Western Main Line, in Cox Green, south of Maidenhead, with other Johnson & Johnson (beauty) brands, and Lexmark UK. Bisham Abbey, on the Thames, is a site of one of the National Sports Centres, at the A404/A308 Bisham Roundabout, to the west of Maidenhead. GEO Group UK (prisoner custody) is off the A4130 in Hurley, on the western edge of the district, with Hospira UK, owned by Pfizer.

BG Group, Prudential plc (the country's biggest life insurer with 7m customers), the Rural Payments Agency, and Guide Dogs for the Blind are in Reading. Primark UK, near Reading Civic Centre, was started by Arthur Ryan in Ireland; it arrived in the UK in 1973 and has bought many former sites of C&A and Littlewoods. North of the railway line is TP-Link UK (routers). Off the A33 towards the Three Mile Cross Interchange (M4) in south Reading is the Green Park Business Park, home of Symantec UK (previously in Whitley), many Cisco offices and Thames Water and to the south is the former Berkshire Brewery (closed in April 2010 by Heineken UK) and Verizon UK.

Borland UK, Interserve and Mabey Group, the bridge manufacturer, are in Twyford. Bang & Olufsen UK is in Winnersh. Rockwell Collins UK (avionics, flight control systems), is next to Jacobs Engineering UK, at the end of the A3290 near the A4 Sutton Seeds Roundabout, at Suttons Business Park in Earley; on the opposite side of the railway is Thames Valley Park, with Oracle next to ING Direct UK in Earley and Microsoft UK in Woodley; The University of Reading's Reading Scientific Services (RSSL) in Earley is Cadbury's main research centre.

Foster Wheeler UK is in Shinfield in the old headquarters of Berkshire County Council, next to the M4; next door is the European Centre for Medium-Range Weather Forecasts on the site of the former Met Office College. Auto Trader Group is in nearby Earley. The Royal Electrical and Mechanical Engineers (REME) are based at Arborfield Garrison, partly in Barkham, also home of the School of Electronic and Aeronautical Engineering. Pelco UK is at the Mulberry Business Park in south-west Wokingham. Christie Digital Systems (EMEA office) is in the centre. Off the B3430 in Wokingham Without, McNeil have a laboratory, south of district.

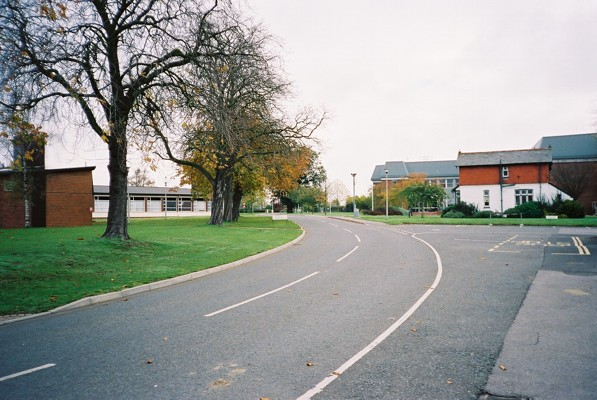
Jealott's Hill Research Station (pesticides), former ICI Plant Protection Division

Syngenta UK and Wincor Nixdorf UK (ATMs) are in Bracknell. Boehringer Ingelheim UK is off the A3095 in west Bracknell in Easthampstead; nearby to the north is Waitrose; to the east along the A3095 is Panasonic UK; next door to the south is IHS UK (owner of Jane's Information Group) and HHI Europe (construction equipment); further along the A3095 is BMW (GB); BMW sold their first model in the UK in 1966, the 2002, and sold 230,000 cars in the UK, a record amount. In 2017, German car imports to the UK were worth €20.8 billion. To the south on the Southern Ind Est is Daler-Rowney (known for its acrylic paint; Rowney was the first supplier in Europe in 1963.

On the other side of the A329, towards the B3408, is Cable & Wireless (the former overseas equivalent of BT); to the west on the Amen Corner Business Park in Farley Wood next to the A329 and the railway, is Dell UK; next door is HP UK (in Winnersh from the 1970s to 1990s) to the west; 3M UK is to the north-east, next to Bracknell Bees ice-hockey stadium. Novell UK is on the A329, north of the A322 roundabout at Arlington Square (former Sperry Gyroscope), and next door is Honeywell UK on the A329 at the Skimped Hill Roundabout near the Odeon cinema. Avis Europe (with Budget UK) is further north at the A322/A3095 Met Office Roundabout near Bracknell and Wokingham College; Imation UK is next door on the roundabout; south of the roundabout is Netgear UK next to the A3095. To the north, Syngenta have their main worldwide (pesticide) research centre at Jealott's Hill, formerly owned by ICI. The Transport Research Laboratory and Broadmoor Hospital are in Crowthorne near the Wokingham boundary.

=== Buckinghamshire ===
High Wycombe is known historically for its furniture industry, and has the Association of Master Upholsterers & Soft Furnishers. Hyundai UK and Tetra Pak UK are at Wycombe Marsh on the A40, and Dreams, the UK base of Ariston (now owned by Indesit), Wilkinson Sword, Merisant UK, and Staples are based in High Wycombe; Cofely (energy services) and Rank Hovis are off the M40 Handy Cross Interchange, with The Perfume Shop, the food technology centre of Premier Foods, and Instron Europe (tension testing machines), off the A4010. To the north of the town centre is Sennheiser UK (audio equipment). RAF High Wycombe (Air Command) is at Bradenham on Grim's Ditch (Chilterns) off the A4010. To the west of the town, United Biscuits have their group technical centre on Sands Ind Estate, off the A4010, near the rugby ground of London Wasps. Swedish Match UK (all their matches are made in Sweden) are in Totteridge. Johnson & Johnson UK have their base at Booker next to the M40 near Handy Cross, with Janssen-Cilag UK (Imodium); Taylor Wimpey is off the A4010, with Focusrite, a big industry player in consoles for sound recording, with Novation Digital Music Systems MIDI controllers and keyboards.

Pilot Pen UK is on the Wessex Road Industrial Estate in Wooburn and Bourne End; Psion Teklogix UK is in the middle of Bourne End, east of Marlow, on the A4155 (Symbian, found on most smartphones until 2010, was developed from Psion's EPOC); nearby are Kawasaki UK and Nuance Communications UK. In Wooburn Green, to the east off the A4094 is Menarini UK Takeda UK (both pharmaceuticals). Wyeth UK (pharmaceuticals) is in Burnham, next to the M4 Huntercombe Spur junction. Saclà Italia UK (pesto) is in Beaconsfield; Grünenthal UK (pharmaceuticals) is off the Stokenchurch Interchange of the M40.

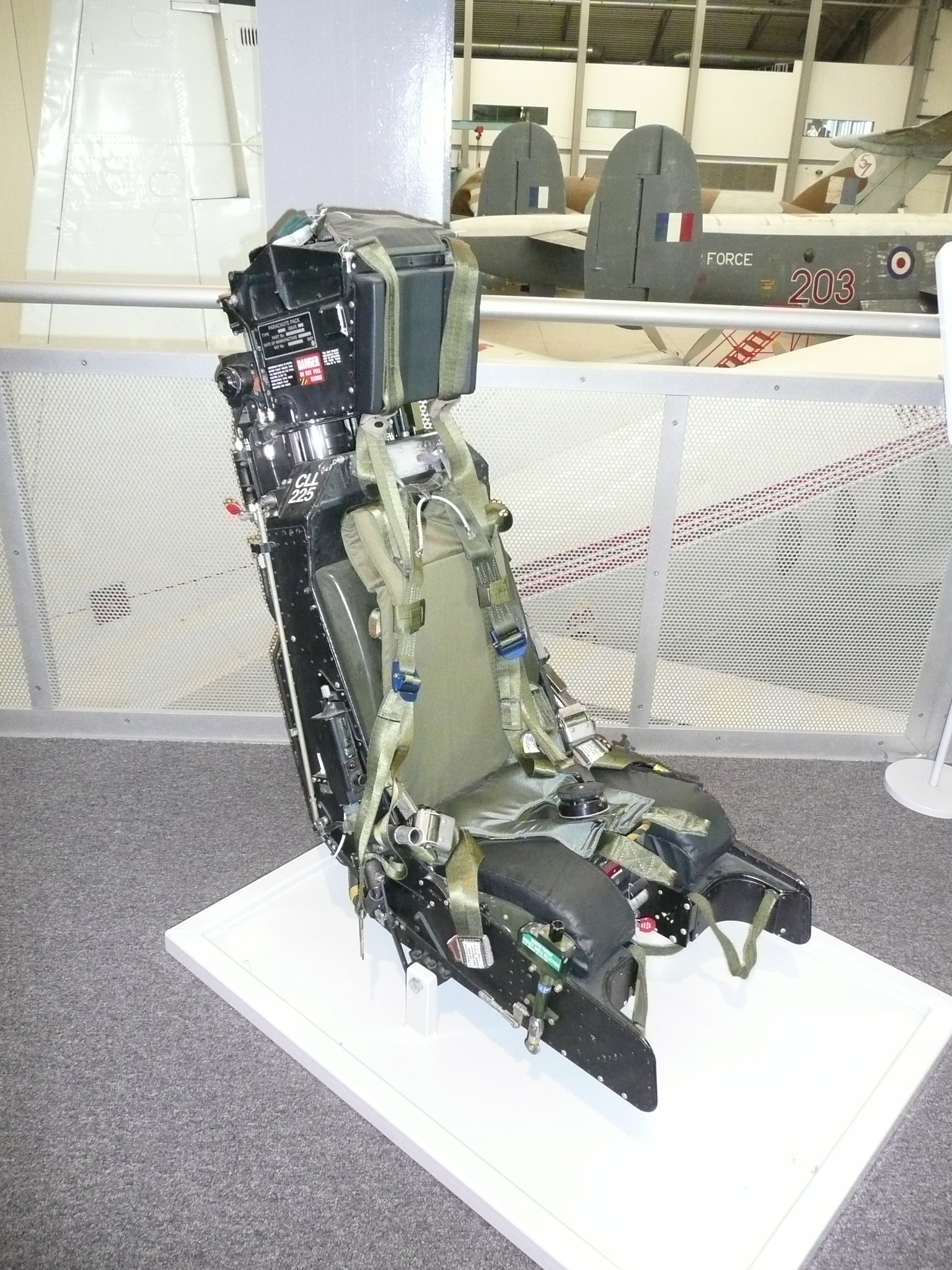
Martin-Baker Mk 9 ejection seat; Martin-Baker seats have saved around 950 RAF pilots, and around 7600 pilots around the world, and were developed by Sir James Martin (1893–1981) from Northern Ireland.

The UK base of Robert Bosch is in Denham. Martin-Baker is in Higher Denham, and InterContinental Hotels Group is in Denham Green (formerly in Windsor) at Broadwater Park on the A412. On the edge of Uxbridge, but on the Buckinghamshire side of Shire Ditch in (New) Denham is Amgen UK (biotechnology), Bristol Myers Squibbb UK (pharmaceuticals), and Mondelēz International UK (former Kraft); on the other side of the A4020 in the south of Denham next to River Colne, on the Great London boundary, is Medirest, Eurest, at the HQ of Compass Group UK. Pioneer UK is in Stoke Poges on the former site of the Fulmer Research Institute; Hitachi Data Systems EMEA is at Sefton Park (a former Glaxo research centre) on the B416, now home of Urenco Group (international uranium enrichment).

DX Group (couriers), are next to Muller Martini UK (binding), and Cummins have a design plant at Rideway Trading Est next to the M25 at Iver; Pinewood Studios is in Iver Heath; it takes its name as it is next to the adjacent pine trees in the 530 acres of Black Park. Avid Technology UK (industry-standard Pro Tools audio and Sibelius notation software) is also based at Pinewood. Timberland Europe is at Wexham Springs, in Wexham west of Pinewood Studios in the same place is Servier Laboratories UK and Sun Chemical Europe (the world's largest producer of printing inks). STMicroelectronics UK (French-Italian, based in Geneva), is based next to Trend Micro UK (Japanese) on Globeside Park at Marlow, next to the A404 and nearby are Expansys and Whistl (former TNT Post UK, part of PostNL), both north of Marlow railway station; Techtronic Industries UK (Ryobi power tools) is on the same estate. Dun & Bradstreet UK (credit references) is on the A404 bypass at the A4155 Westhorpe Interchange. GE Healthcare has its world HQ in Little Chalfont. Uniq plc (bought by Greencore in November 2011) was in Chalfont St Peter, next to the A413 and River Misbourne, off the B416 Kingsway Roundabout, next to Citrix UK; Doro UK (Swedish mobile phones) are off the A413. Bahlsen UK is in Gerrards Cross off the B416.

NT CADCAM in Haddenham is the UK distributor of the industry-standard SolidWorks CAD software package; Schwartz UK (spices) and McCormick UK, the parent company of Camp Coffee, is near Haddenham and Thame Parkway railway station off the A418 between Thame and Aylesbury. Acco UK (stationery), who own Rexel (stationery) and GBC (pouch laminators), are on the A418 in Aylesbury, opposite Aylesbury College; Askeys have made ice cream cones since 1965 next to the A4157 and Grand Union Canal. Demag Hamilton (owned by Sumitomo) who make plastic injection-moulding machines, is based on the Triangle Business Park on the A413 next to the railway in Stoke Mandeville. At Long Crendon is Terex Demag UK (cranes), and Unic UK (mini cranes). Arla opened its huge Aylesbury dairy in Aylesbury in 2014, on the A41 Aston Clinton bypass. Arla Aylesbury is a fresh milk processing facility with 34 acres; its plastic bottles are made on-site by Alpla.

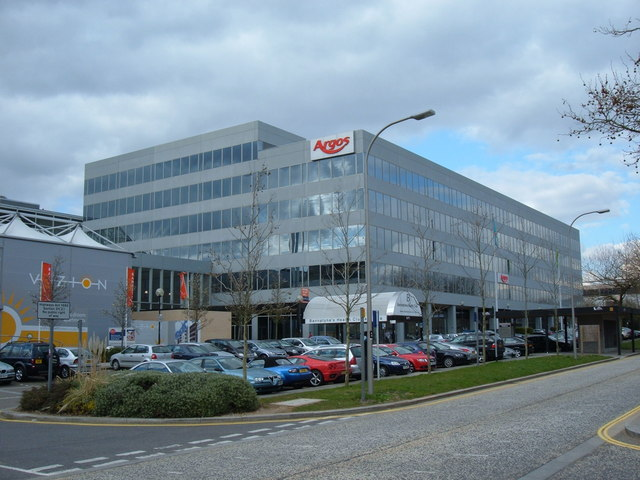
Argos head office on Avebury Boulevard in Milton Keynes; Argos was established in 1973 from what was the Green Shield Stamps company and shops, and since 2016 has been owned by Sainsbury's, formerly Home Retail Group.

Milton Keynes is home to many national companies such as Santander UK operations. The Home Retail Group (Argos and Homebase), Filtrona, Ingram Micro UK and BP Oil UK (retail) are in Central Milton Keynes, as is the Network Rail headquarters at Quadrant:MK. Rightmove is in Winterhill. Nearby, on the other side of A5, Loughton is the home of the National House Building Council (NHBC), the National Energy Foundation, and the former Atmosphere Bars and Clubs west of the A5, near Central MK; Leica Geosystems (owned by Hexagon AB, surveying equipment), on the same estate, is opposite the NHBC, and the Parcelforce HQ is nearby; to the south of Loughton is Korg UK (keyboards) and Vox (originally from Kent, makers of amplifiers), just north of the National Bowl, off Watling Street; to the west of Loughton at the Crownhill Ind Est in Shenley Church End, SMC Pneumatics have their European Technical Centre. The National Badminton Centre is in Loughon Lodge.

East of the A5, Luminar Leisure is headquartered in Rooksley (Bradwell CP). In the north-west, the European HQ of WD-40 and Rockwell Automation UK (former Allen-Bradley) are in Kiln Farm, Bradwell Abbey; near Sysmex UK (healthcare electronics) and Volkswagen Group's National Learning Centre. To the north, NEFF UK, Gaggenau UK, and BSH Home Appliances are in Wolverton and Greenleys; opposite is Mars Horsecare UK; Electrolux have their distribution centre next to the WCML and Wolverton station.

To the east, near the M1 and the A422 in Great Linford, Chrysler UK (Jeep and Dodge), Scania UK (part of VW), Rohan (clothing), Makita UK (power tools) and Mercedes-Benz UK (including Smart Cars) are in Tongwell; VAG UK (VW and Audi) is opposite in Blakelands on the north side of the A422 opposite Tongwell Lake. DRS mark exam papers by electronic data capture at Linford Wood, south of the A422 and Stantonbury, near Leica Microsystems; Mitsubishi Pencil Company UK (uni-ball) is off the A422 at the B4034 Redbridge Roundabout; H. Bronnley & Co. (soap) is on the site of a factory used to build the GEC-Marconi AI.24 Foxhunter radar in the 1980s.

The OU at Milton Keynes

In the south-east of Milton Keynes, The Open University is in Walton Hall, in Walton; BT Development & Training (management) is based at Kents Hill, next to the OU, after it moved from Bletchley Park in 1993; south of the OU is Walton Manor, home of MSD Animal Health (former Intervet, and previously a Hoechst laboratory). Red Bull Racing is off the A4146 in Tilbrook, south of the OU; nearby is Jungheinrich UK (forklifts) in Walton near Bow Brickhill railway station, and Yamaha Music Europe; north of Tilbrook on the A4146 is Walker Greenbank (upmarket furnishings). Fisher & Paykel UK (fridges) are in Kingston, Milton Keynes Village. Nearby is Duravit UK (bathroom plumbing); in Kingston off the A421 are Alpla UK (plastics), and Koyo UK (JTEKT). Just east of the A421, near Wavendon and M1 Junction 13, John Lewis, River Island and Amazon have large logistics warehouses in the Magna Park distribution centre.

In the south-west of Milton-Keynes, Chemetall, a chemical company, is in Denbigh West, Bletchley, near Marshall Amplification, near Denbigh Roundabout (B4034); Yokohama UK (tyres) is at Mount Farm (Bletchley and Fenny Stratford) north of Denbigh West, next to the A5 (Fenny Stratford bypass); to the east of Mount Farm, Kemble and Co. were Britain's last piano manufacturers, until the factory closed in 2009. Holophane Europe make floodlighting on the Mount Farm Ind Est, east of A4146/A5 Caldecotte Interchange; on the west of Mount Farm, on the B4034, Basell Polyolefins UK (part of the Dutch LyondellBasell) make polypropylene compounds. Domino's Pizza Group (arrived in the UK in 1985) is in West Ashland near the A5/A421 junction. Suzuki GB is on the A421 near B4034 roundabout at Tattenhoe in Shenley Brook End on the south-western edge.

Elsewhere in the borough, Welcome Break is at the M1 service station in Newport Pagnell, where Aston Martin had a factory until 2007 (The existing site is now home to the Aston Martin Works, which focuses on heritage sales, service, spares and restoration operations). The town is also home to a customer centre of car retailer Cazoo, located just off the A509/A422 junction at Tickford Roundabout. FCO Services and HMGCC is based at Hanslope Park, in a rural area 6 mi (9.7 km) north of Central Milton Keynes.

=== Hampshire ===
The Army have a large garrison in Aldershot, with Sandhurst being nearby. Elica also make extractor hoods in Aldershot, and the European HQ of the Computer Sciences Corporation consulting firm is based at the A323/A325 roundabout. Rentokil Initial have their head office and pest control division next to Blackwater railway station, north of the A30, towards Camberley. Farnborough has many international aerospace companies as well as Sofa Workshop. Nokia UK, which had also been a R&D base for Nokia Siemens Networks on the A327, left in 2012; further along the A327 is Autodesk UK.

DKB Household UK (Zyliss) is off the A327 in North Farnborough; at the A325/A327 roundabout is Parametric Technology Corporation UK (known for its industry-standard PTC Creo Elements/Pro (Pro/ENGINEER) CAD/CAM software) with Red Hat UK. Thomson Local directory is on the A325 next to Farnborough railway station, next to the Catholic National Library; opposite is the design centre for Qualcomm UK (W-CDMA UMTS mobile technology) with Hogg Robinson Group UK (its worldwide headquarters are in Basingstoke). BAE Systems with CORDA is south of the airfield at the Farnborough Aerospace Centre, off the A325/A3011 Queen's Roundabout. Sun Microsystems had their UK headquarters at Guillemont Park (former Guillemont Barracks until 1997) north of the M3 Minley Interchange at Blackwater and Hawley, until 2009.

The Ford Southampton plant of Ford, near Southampton Airport and Stoneham Interchange (A335) of the M27, closed in July with production of the Transit moving to the Ford Otosan plant in Gölcük, Kocaeli (Turkey). Skandia Insurance have their UK base there. Carnival Corporation & plc, the world's largest cruise ship operator, has one of its two headquarters at Carnival House. The Maritime and Coastguard Agency is in the town centre near the A3057. Swatch UK (and Omega UK) are based near Millbrook Flyover (A33).

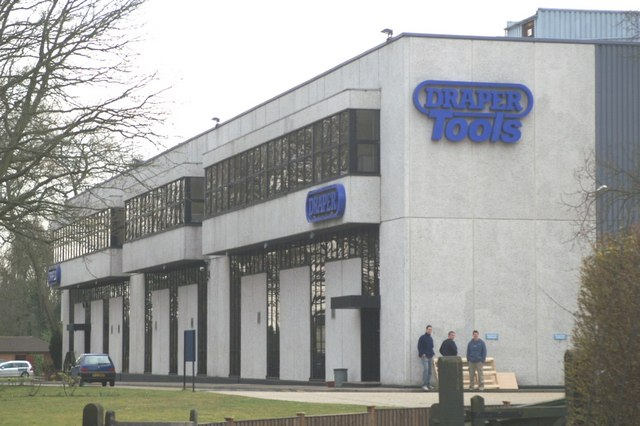
HQ of Draper Tools

B&Q and Draper Tools are based in Chandler's Ford. Prysmian Cables & Systems, who make high-tension electric cables (for offshore windfarms), communication cables and fire-resistant cable, are off the B3037 in Eastleigh, next to a rail servicing plant and the River Itchen. Bacardi-Martini and London Camera Exchange are in Winchester and four miles (6.4 km) north-west, Arqiva (broadcasting infrastructure, at the former technical division of the IBA) are based in Crawley, Hampshire. The Adjutant General's Corps HQ (former Royal Army Pay Corps) is at Worthy Down Camp off the A34 north of Winchester at Kings Worthy, since 2012 the home of the Defence School of Personnel Administration. To the north-west, the Leckford Estate, with Longstock Park, next door provides much of the milk, mushrooms, fruit, honey and free-range chicken for Waitrose; John Spedan Lewis, founder of John Lewis, lived there until his death in 1963.

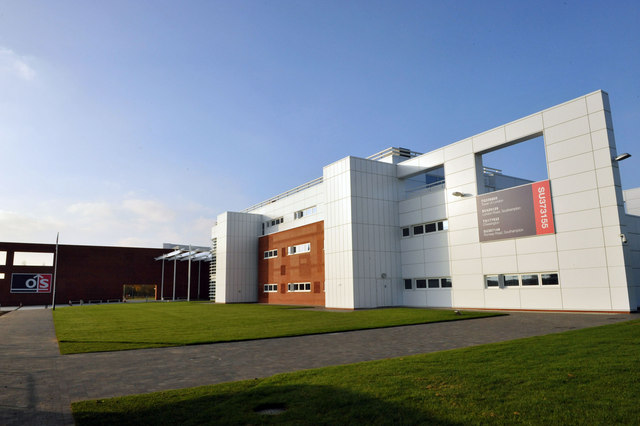
Ordnance Survey headquarters at Adanac Park

Garmin Europe is in Hounsdown just west of Southampton. Esso has its main UK refinery at Fawley (the largest refinery, by production, in the UK); north of Fawley is Polimeri Europa UK (former International Synthetic Rubber, now owned by Eni) off the A326, which makes elastomers. Ineos, the third largest chemicals company in the world, is in Lyndhurst in the New Forest (A35). Roke Manor Research (founded by Plessey in 1956, and owned since 2010 by Chemring) at Roke Manor at Romsey Extra developed the Hawk-Eye system in 2001. The Ordnance Survey have a new headquarters (previously further east in Southampton before 2011) at Nursling and Rownhams, off the M271 Nursling Interchange. On the A337 in Mudeford in the east of Christchurch is a large BAE Systems radar site (the former Signals Research and Development Establishment).

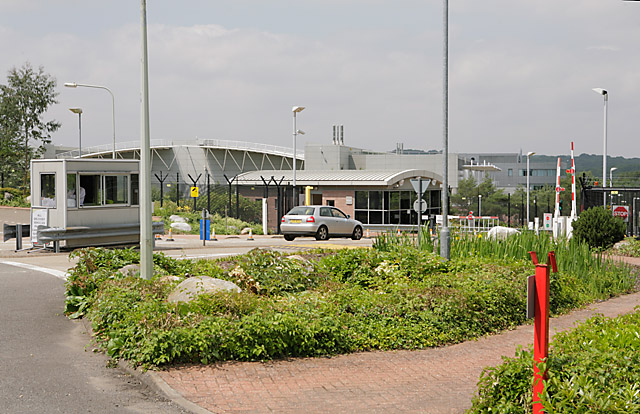
National Air Traffic Service headquarters at Swanwick

Best Buy Europe is in Hedge End; SPI Lasers make fibre lasers for optical fibres; Glen Dimplex have an HQ north of the A334. Chemring Group, Boskalis Westminster (dredging) and the National Air Traffic Services (NATS) are in Fareham (Swanwick) near Zurich Insurance UK. At Locks Heath off the A27 further south at Kite's Croft Business Park is Estée Lauder UK and the scrapped South East Regional Control Centre (FiReControl). On the opposite side of the A27 on Funtley Ind Est is Eaton Aerospace, who have their Fuel & Motion Control Systems Division (aerial refuelling, making fuel valves for aircraft), which is the former Abbey Works site of Plessey Dynamics (Mechanical Systems) and Plessey Aerospace.

Raymarine Marine Electronics (owned by FLIR Systems) off the A27 (near Estée Lauder) at Titchfield is the world's leading leisure marine electronics company. TÜV SÜD UK (product certification) are next to Gemalto UK, who make chip and PIN cards, at Segensworth between the railway and the M27; further along is CooperVision, who make contact lenses, and next door is Turbomeca UK (part of Safran). GE Aviation, on a site which was formerly Folland Aircraft then BAe Aerostructures, has a factory at Hamble-le-Rice which makes composites for airframes and racing cars, using products such as Bismaleimide resin. Crewsaver (owned by Survitec), Covidien UK (owned by VNUS), and Wickham Laboratories are off the A32 at Fleetlands, (north of Gosport), south of Fareham, and north of DM Gosport, which handles the Navy's armaments including Sea Skua, Sea Wolf, the Eurosam Aster, Sea Dart (surface-to-air), and GEC-Marconi Sting Ray (torpedo).

Kenwood, owned by De'Longhi since 2001, have a factory at West Leigh, Havant; next-door, Sumika Polymer Compounds (owned by Sumitomo Chemical), and Pfizer (former Wyeth Biotech before 2009) have plants on New Lane Ind Est next to the railway. Lockheed Martin U.K. is at the Langstone Technology Park off the A3023, near the A27, at Brockhampton, near to Apollo Fire Detectors, Jobsite (owned by dmg::media), and Pains Wessex (a leading manufacturer of maritime distress flares); SSE plc have their main southern HQ on the Southmoor Lane Ind Est next door. Paradigm Secure Communications (Airbus Defence and Space) control the UK's Ariane-launched Skynet military satellites from former the RAF Oakhanger off the A325 west of Bordon.

Southwick House, off the B2177 in Southwick and Widley, is the home of the Defence School of Policing and Guarding and the Regimental Headquarters of the Royal Military Police. VT Group is based in Hedge End, with VT Education & Skills and VT Flagship based in North Harbour, Portsmouth. Near the A2030/A27 Farlington Roundabout in east Portsmouth, Airbus Defence and Space (former Astrium before 2014, and earlier Marconi Space and Defence Systems) at Anchorage Park near Hilsea railway station, make payloads for the Galileo navigation system, at its Broad Oak Works, with SELEX Elsag and BAE Systems on the former Portsmouth Airport; GKN Aerospace (former FPT Industries) situated at the former make aviation self-sealing fuel tanks; Atmosphere Control International (former Wellman Defence before 2012, and part of TPG Engineering) in Portsmouth make the air purifiers for the British and French nuclear submarines. PALL Europe (fluid filtration) is based on the Harbourgate Business Park, on the opposite side of the M27 from Port Solent. Much of the Royal Navy is based at HMNB Portsmouth with BAE Systems Surface Ships; Navy Command Headquarters is at Whale Island, next to the M275. IBM is headquartered in Cosham, North Portsmouth, with large laboratories in Hursley House.

Lenovo UK and Serco are at Bartley Wood Business Park, off the B3349 (M3 Hook Interchange), with Virgin Media (13,600 staff in the UK, with 1,200 at the head office); next door is First Drinks, a whisky distributor owned by William Grant & Sons, Trimble Navigation UK (GPS systems) and HP Enterprise Services Defence & Security UK (former EDS Defence). The Police Staff College, Bramshill, the Police's main training centre, is nearby to the north; the European Police College (CEPOL, run by Europol) was at Bramshill until 2014 when it moved to Budapest. Festo GB (industrial automation, based at Esslingen am Neckar) is next to the M3 on Ancells Business Park, next to Rohde & Schwarz UK (electronic testing). Vertu, division of Nokia makes luxury phones at Church Crookham. CV-Library is in Fleet; Conair Group (BaByliss hair dryers) are at the nearby Waterfront Business Park.

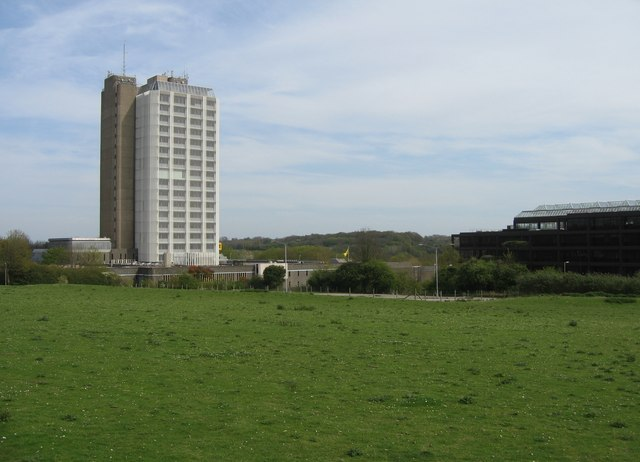
The AA's headquarters at Fanum House in Basingstoke

The AA, Scott Wilson, Genus plc, and Winterthur Life are based in Basingstoke. The pharmaceuticals group Eli Lilly UK, with Elanco UK (animal health), is in Norfolk House in Houndmills east of the North Hampshire Hospital, the main home for Hampshire Hospitals NHS Foundation Trust; also in Houndmills are Fyffes UK (next to the railway), and GAME Group, with Gamestation (formerly in York), which it bought in 2007; Palgrave Macmillan, a leading worldwide trade publisher with the Pharmaceutical Press, is south of A339 and hospital. Thales Missile Electronics (former Thorn EMI) is in central Basingstoke near the A3010/A339 junction, which makes parts for the Brimstone missile. Alberto-Culver UK and Shire Pharmaceuticals Group plc left the Hampshire International Business Park near Chineham in 2011 and 2017 respectively.

On the Chineham Business Park is the Gas Safe Register (predecessor CORGI was also in Basingstoke), and Hama UK (photography equipment); Peek Traffic, south of Shire, is one of two companies in the UK that make traffic signals. Motorola UK, next-door to Meggitt Sensing Systems, and De La Rue are on the Viables industrial estate next to the M3 and Cranbourne; BD UK (former CareFusion UK before 2014) makes Alaris infusion pumps, medical ventilators and automated dispensing cabinets. De La Rue have a main banknote printing works at Overton Mill in Overton, to the west towards the A34, and a holographics factory on the Daneshill industrial estate, in the west of the town; De Dietrich UK (kitchen appliances) are near a plant of Thermo Fisher Scientific UK, and Boeing Defence UK. Mars Drinks (Flavia Beverage Systems and Klix) is north of the railway, south of Daneshill.

Gale Cengage UK are in the east of Andover, off the A3093 on Walworth Industrial Estate; further south are Twinings (who also own Ovaltine) and to east of the estate is Stannah Lifts (owned by SSI Schaefer), next to Petty Wood, owner of the Epicure food brand, with Le Creuset UK (cookware); Euronics UK is further west. The Army Air Corps trains at Middle Wallop Flying Station, off the A343. Britten-Norman (B-N Group) make turboprop aeroplanes on the Isle of Wight. The Danish Vestas (former NEG Micon before 2004) closed the UK's only wind turbine factory on the Isle of Wight in 2010, and Vestas Technology have a research site in Northwood; Stainless Games developed Carmageddon. GKN Aerospace at East Cowes make engine nacelles, with its Composites Research Centre, in the former main plant of Saunders-Roe. Ratsey and Lapthorn make sails at Cowes.

=== Kent ===
BAE Systems Electronics, Intelligence & Support, next to Rochester Airport, manufacture helmet mounted displays and head-up displays; it was GEC Avionics, previously Marconi Avionics and Elliott Flight Automation, and Kent's biggest employer in the 1980s; the display technology originated from acquiring Cintel in 1963; the site was a Shorts factory in the war, and built many Short Sunderlands. The Royal Engineers and the Royal School of Military Engineering are based in Chatham at Brompton Barracks. London Thamesport is on the Isle of Grain. Metsä Board UK (paper) is off the A289 near Medway Tunnel, and next to the Universities at Medway, Chatham. Sleepeezee (owned by the Simmons Bedding Company) is at Conquest Ind Est in Strood on the A228 next to the River Medway. Bose UK are on the Gillingham Business Park, off the A278 near the A2 Bowaters Roundabout; on other side of A278 is Delphi Diesel Systems.

Bovis Homes is near Gravesend and in Northfleet on the B2175, Kimberly-Clark (formerly Bowater-Scott until 1996) makes Andrex toilet rolls. Caterham Cars manufacturers of British sports cars including the Caterham 7 have their manufacturing facilities in Dartford. Laing O'Rourke is off the A206 in Stone, east of the Dartford Tunnel on Crossways Business Park, where Mazda UK are; in the same building is Forest Laboratories UK (bought by Actavis in 2014), who make Veno's (cough mixture, the brand was bought from Beechams-GSK in 2011), Sudocrem, Otomize (Dexamethasone) and Bisodol (indigestion), made in Dartford; Crosswater (taps and showers) is in Stone, further along the A206 near the Thames Europort.

Bluewater in Greenhithe is the third-largest shopping centre in the UK; it was built on the former Blue Circle Swanscombe Cement Works, which closed in 1990. South East Water is in Snodland. H+H UK (aerated concrete) is based at the A25/A227 roundabout at Ightham, south of Wrotham; to the east is Geographers' A-Z Map Company off the A227 near the railway station, near the M26. Aylesford Newsprint (owned by Svenska Cellulosa Aktiebolaget and Mondi Group), between the M20 and River Medway, makes newsprint and is Europe's largest recycler of paper.

Rolex since 2010 has had its European headquarters (it moved from Bexley) at Kings Hill near West Malling on the A228; Kimberly-Clark have their UK HQ there, on the former RAF West Malling wartime airfield, near FLIR Systems UK (thermal imaging); opposite is the Charities Aid Foundation and to the east is Voyages-sncf.com (former Rail Europe before 2013, who operate InterRail) near the Tonbridge and Malling council offices. Readers in Teston, to the south on the A26, are the UK's leading manufacturer of cricket balls. DS Smith Paper (former Bowater-Scott), Britain's largest paper manufacturer is at Kemsley, north of Sittingbourne, off the A249/B2005 Grovehurst Road Junction. Shepherd Neame Brewery in Faversham is Britain's oldest brewer. Brake Bros is on the Eureka Business Park, off the A251 north of M20 junction 9 in Boughton Aluph; nearby is Coty Rimmel UK (perfumes) and Houchin (owned by ITW), who make ground power units for airport aprons.

Further south along the M20, Givaudan UK (flavourings, former Quest International, and previously Proprietary Perfume and Flavours, or PPF International) has a 10-acre large plant in Kennington; next-door is Premier Foods (former RHM before 2007, and opened as Batchelors in 1957) on the A2070 next to the River Great Stour and the railway, east of the M20; the 16-acre site makes Paxo stuffing, Savoury Rice, Pasta n Sauce, Bisto, Cup-a-Soup (introduced in 1972), Vesta curries (launched by Batchelors in 1961), and claims to be the largest dry food manufacturing site in Europe; it now makes Bird's Custard and Angel Delight. Chartham Papers (owned by Arjo Wiggins) is the UK's only manufacturer of tracing paper at Chartham. Kent grows three-quarters of the UK's Bramley apples.

Cummins Power Generation is in Acol, near Manston Airport on the A299, and Pfizer, the largest pharmaceutical company in the world and manufacturer of Anadin, had its European R&D site in Sandwich until 2012, next to the River Stour and A256. Hornby, with Airfix and Humbrol, is on the A254 on Westwood Ind Est on the southern edge of Margate; the site started out as Tri-ang Railways in 1954, becoming Hornby in 1972 when the parent company collapsed, and the last model train sets were made there in 1999; these are now made by a company owned by Kader. Delfinware (owned by WPP plc) makes dish drainers off the A259 on the Pennypot Ind Estate in Hythe. Megger make electrical test equipment in Dover on the A20; nearby P&O Ferries is on the A20 below the Dover Western Heights. Saga plc, founded in 1959, has a large headquarters in Sandgate, next to Folkestone School for Girls, at the A259/B2963 junction.

Axa Personal pension scheme is in Tunbridge Wells, and Lamberts Healthcare (part of Merck), based at High Brooms, are a leading manufacturer of vitamin supplements. J.H. Dewhurst (founded in 1919) was last based in Tunbridge Wells, until it closed in 2006 (it had in the early 1990s over 1,100 stores nationwide and was Britain's largest butcher). Panini UK are on the A264 in the west of Tunbridge Wells. Rotosound on the A22 near Sevenoaks railway station makes guitar strings. Salter Housewares (weighing equipment) is in the east of Tonbridge at the A26/B2017 roundabout in Tudeley, Capel; Adrian Scripps produce apples off the B2017 near the A228 east of Tonbridge.

=== Oxfordshire ===
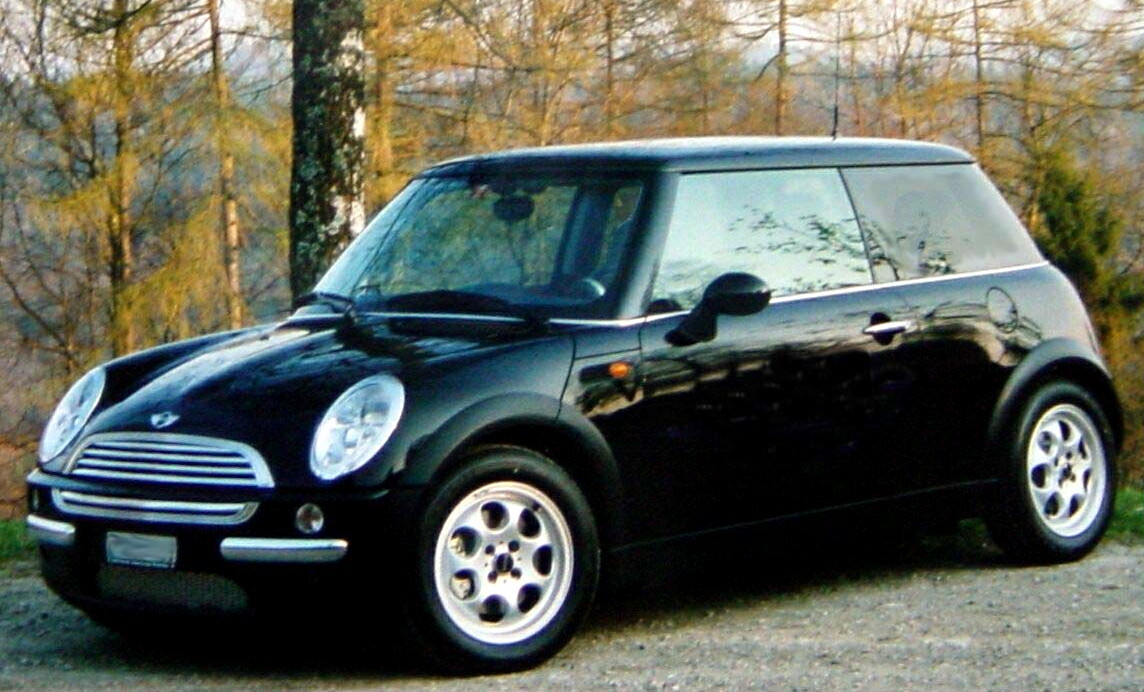
Around 1,000 Minis are made each day in Cowley; BMW bought the plant in 1994 and has made around 3m since 2001; there are 4,500 staff and around ten miles of conveyors; the engines are made at Hams Hall in North Warwickshire.

Oxford University Press, Blackwell UK, Electrocomponents and Amey plc are in Oxford as is the BMW plant that builds the Mini. BMW assemble the MINI at Cowley; in the south of Oxford is Unipart and TI Automotive UK. South of Oxford in Littlemore, off the A4074 at the Oxford Science Park is Nominet UK (UK domain names). SAE Institute has its world HQ on Littlemore Park off the A4074. Grafton Merchanting GB (Buildbase, and Hirebase) are on Oxford Business Park in Cowley, with Electrocomponents next to Publishing Technology, Blackwell UK and Harley Davidson UK; to the south on the side of the B480 is Oxfam GB at Oxfam House, BT iNet, and TI Automotive; further north along the B480 at the B4495 junction is Macmillan Education, a leading worldwide publisher of school textbooks, with Genzyme UK (owned since 2011 by Sanofi).

Ascari are in Banbury. Kenco coffee is made at Kraft Foods Banbury owned by Mondelēz International (former Kraft before October 2010) with Café HAG and Carte Noir off A422/A423 roundabout opposite a Tesco; the site was built to make Bird's Custard in 1964, by General Foods who were bought by Kraft in 1990, and claims to be the biggest coffee-production site in Europe; Nestle make much of their coffee in South Derbyshire. On other side of A422 to Kraft is a manufacturing site of Dematic UK, with Terex MHPS (former Demag Cranes), and Kannegiesser UK (industrial clothes washers). On north-east side of Banbury is the large site of Norbar Torque, who are a main international manufacturer of torque wrenchs. Next door is a large factory of Barry Callebaut UK, a Swiss manufacturer of cocoa (for Nestle and Cadbury), on the Wildmere Road Ind Est, north of the A422 near the M40 junction 11. Prodrive are on the north of the estate, and iSOFT are on the east near the M40. Further north was a main site of Alcan Extrusions (former British Aluminium, bought by Alcan in 1982), which closed in 2008.

Yaskawa UK (Motoman robotic welding equipment) is on the Wildmere Ind Est, off the A422 near junction 11; Kärcher UK (pressure washers) are nearby off the A423. Marussia F1 are in the east of Banbury. Hook Norton Brewery is to the south-west. Travelodge UK is at the A418/B4445 roundabout in Thame next to CPM Group (the UK's largest field marketing company), with Lucy Electric (switchgear) in the east of Thame off the B4012, with the UK site of UMC (branded televisions from Slovakia). Kubota UK, the tractor manufacturer, on the B4445, is the UK market leader of ride-on (diesel) lawn mowers; Kidde Products UK (fire protection) is off the B4012. Renault F1 is in Enstone; off B4030 at Enstone Airfield Complex, Airbus Helicopters UK (Eurocopter before 2014) is at London Oxford Airport. Agilent Technologies (former Magnex Scientific) make superconducting magnets for NMR applications on the A44 next to the railway at Yarnton. Solid State Logic (mixing consoles) is at Begbroke on the A44, which has the Begbroke Science Park.

The Joint European Torus is developing fusion power at Culham on a former airfield. Also on the Culham Science Centre at Clifton Hampden is the United Kingdom Atomic Energy Authority, and the re-usable Skylon spacecraft is being developed by Reaction Engines Limited; ABSL Space Products Culham (owned by EnerSys) made batteries for Philae. The Rutherford Appleton Laboratory and Diamond Light Source (built by the Wellcome Trust) are on the Harwell Science and Innovation Campus in Chilton and East Hendred. Harwell has an office of Telespazio VEGA UK (satellites) and the UK's base of the European Space Agency (ESA), with the European Centre for Space Applications and Telecommunications and the UK's Satellite Applications Catapult; Rutherford Appleton also has the Central Laser Facility, the UK's site of research into inertial confinement fusion power from the HiPER project. The science cluster is known as Science Vale UK.

In Rotherfield Peppard, near Sonning Common, is the Johnson Matthey Technology Centre, which research fuel cells (with platinum supplied by Anglo American Platinum, the world's largest producer). Stuart Turner (pumps) is at Henley-on-Thames, with Ella's Kitchen. Countax UK, off the A329 at Great Haseley (nearer to Great Milton), manufactures Britain's best-selling garden tractors, and distributes ECHO (Japanese) power tools; to the south off the B480, Martin-Baker test ejector seats at Martin Baker Aerospace Chalgrove. Castrol Technology Centre is towards the Thames. South of RAF Benson off the A4074 at Howbery Park, Crowmarsh is HR Wallingford (former Hydraulics Research Station) and further south along the Thames is CAB International (agricultural research).

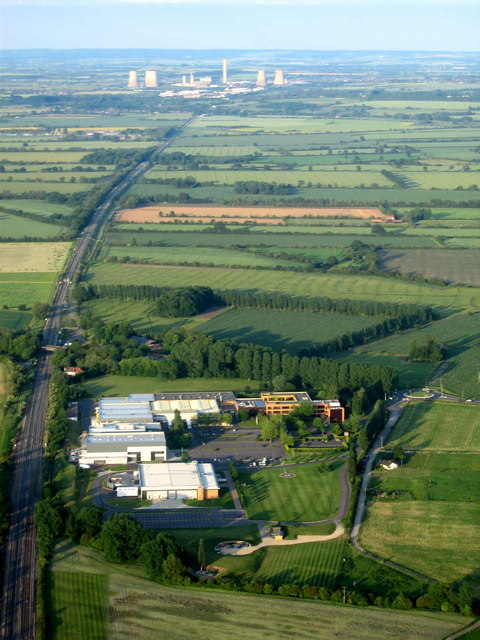
Williams F1 at Grove, next to the Great Western Main Line and A338, north of Wantage

RM Education, Kaspersky Lab UK, Achilles (supply chain risk management, international HQ), Routledge (publisher), Chroma Therapeutics, and Smeg UK are at Milton Park. The former Esso Research Centre at Milton Hill is now the headquarters of Infineum, a division of Esso and Shell which researches oil additives. Rowse Honey is in Wallingford. All parachute training for the RAF and Army takes place at RAF Brize Norton; the RAF 's refuelling force (10 Sqn and 101 Sqn) operate the Voyager, the RAF's largest aircraft, a converted Airbus A330 which carries 111 tonnes of fuel; they also operate the twice-weekly air-bridge to RAF Mount Pleasant; Brize Norton has 24 C-130 Hercules, 8 C-17 Globemasters (99 Sqn), 8 Voyagers (the replacement for the VC-10), and one A400M Atlas (the future replacement for the Hercules). The Blue Cross animal charity are further north on the B4020.

Siemens Magnet Technology (former Oxford Magnet Technology), the main provider of superconducting magnets (30% of the world's market) for MRI scanners, is in Eynsham; in Witney is Wychwood Brewery (owned by Marstons) which makes Hobgoblin, and brews Brakspear Brewery (formerly of Henley until 2002). Oxford Products, off the B4047 west of Witney, make cycle and motorcycle safety products, with Abbott Diabetes Care and Corndell Furniture at Windrush Park. JSP are market leaders in industrial head protection, based next to the River Windrush at Worsham in Asthall west of Witney.

Williams Grand Prix Engineering is based at Grove on the A338 north of Wantage. Towards Wiltshire, the Defence Academy of the United Kingdom is in Shrivenham, with the Defence School of Languages (previously at Wilton Park north of the M40 Beaconsfield Interchange), and the Joint Services Command and Staff College is in Watchfield.

=== Surrey ===
Allianz Insurance has its UK headquarters in Guildford as do Ericsson, Colgate-Palmolive, Constellation Brands, Electronic Arts (formerly in Chertsey before 2008), Sanofi, the CTC, Surrey Satellite Technology, Avaya and Philips. Alexander Dennis is off the A320 at Worplesdon on the north of Guildford on the Slyfield Industrial Estate, towards Jacobs Well. Lionhead Studios and BAE Systems Digital Intelligence are near the Royal Surrey County Hospital. BOC are also in Guildford. UCL's Mullard Space Science Laboratory is high in the Surrey Hills.

Mövenpick Ice Cream is off the A248 at St Martha, to the east of Guildford; Vivid Imaginations, in Artington to the south, own the UK rights to Crayola. The former company, now owned by the Linde Group, was based in Windlesham. British Car Auctions is on the A325 in Farnham. Motor company McLaren and McLaren Automotive are based at the McLaren Technology Centre in Woking as are the UK base of Yum Restaurants (owner of KFC), SABMiller, BIW Technologies, SPSS, and Capgemini. ISS is next to the railway on the Sheerwater Ind Est. In the south of Woodham, next to the Basingstoke Canal, is Playtex, and to the east is Fernox (water treatment, owned by Alent) Towards Woking along the railway is Pirbright (home of the Pirbright Institute), where Merial Animal Health also make vaccines. Tupperware is in Knaphill.

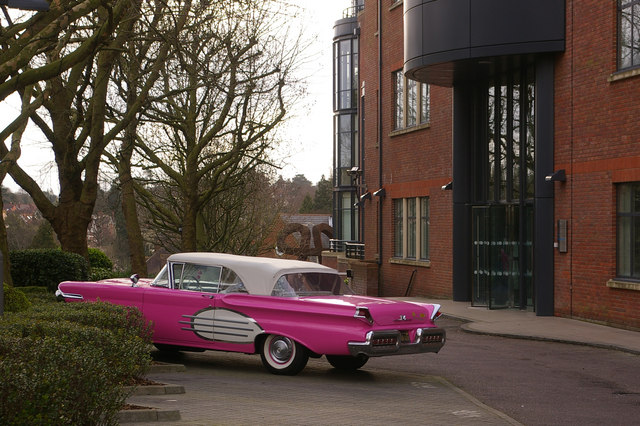
Sheilas' Wheels outside the head office of esure in Reigate; esure was started by Peter Wood.

Friends Life have an office in the north of Dorking in the former HQ of Friends Provident and Kuoni Travel are on the former Deepdene estate. Kimberly-Clark is in the north of Reigate; Esure and Sheilas' Wheels is on the A25 south of Reigate College; Canon is to the south in Woodhatch. SGN is in Horley. Bristow Helicopters is at Redhill and the food research centre Campden-BRI is at Nutfield. Cubic is on the Perrywood Business Park south of Redhill, next door is Rapiscan Systems.

In the area straddling the M25, the huge Compass Group is based in Chertsey as is Samsung, Siemon, Crest Nicholson, Kone, IWG, and Britax. Papa John's Pizza is off the A320 near the M25; Ubisoft is on the B375. Juniper Networks is off the B3121), Pandrol and Royal Caribbean Group are in Addlestone; at Hamm Moor (in the east of Addlestone) on the A317 and Weybridge Business Park is Thales Group and the UK corporate headquarters of Toshiba, who have another base in Camberley; further west along the A317 is Aviator Park, on the B3121, a former main research site of Plessey Radar, later GEC Marconi.

Near Weybridge are the UK headquarters of Sony with SSP Group (situated in Byfleet) and Procter & Gamble (next door to each other on The Heights Business Park near the former Brooklands racing circuit) with Kia and Petroleum Geo-Services, and Gallaher Group to the north, next to the Brooklands Museum; to the east is Verint Systems on the B374. In Weybridge are the local newspaper group Newsquest, Yamaha; BAE Systems Regional Aircraft is on the Brooklands Ind Park off the A318 (since 2001 it has no longer manufactured). On Sprint Ind Est in Byfleet, west of Weybridge, off the A318, AIM Altitude (former Henshalls) make cabin galleys for airliners. The Central Veterinary Laboratory, which is run by the Veterinary Laboratories Agency, with the Animal and Plant Health Agency, is in New Haw to the west on the other side of the M25. Mouchel is in West Byfleet.

Air Products is in Walton-on-Thames. Atkins, the civil engineering company, and are in Epsom; Sartorius is to the north off the B284 next to the railway; Toyota (towards Banstead) is on the A240 at the B284 junction at Great Burgh, Tattenham Corner, at the site of the former R&D HQ of SmithKline Beecham (Beecham Pharmaceuticals) from 1979 until the mid-1990s before their research centre moved to Harlow; Toyota arrived in the UK in 1965 with its Corona, and have made 3m cars in the UK. Legal & General have their largest office near Kingswood railway station. Dairy Crest is in Esher. Ian Allan Publishing is at Hersham. SHL Group (former Saville & Holdsworth) is just to the north-east at Thames Ditton. Samaritans is in Ewell. Ann Summers is in Whyteleafe near Caterham. Caterham Cars sales and marketing offices are in Caterham. Swiftcover (owned by Axa) is on the A307 in the west of Cobham; further to west on the A245 is Berkeley Group Holdings, and Europa Technologies (digital mapping data) is on the A245 opposite Waitrose; Cargill Europe is on the eastern edge. Pfizer is at Walton Oaks (the former R&D HQ of Beecham Pharmaceuticals until 1979) next to the B2032 bridge over the M25 at Walton-on-the-Hill.

BAM Nuttall (opposite Camberley Theatre) and Krispy Kreme (south of the M3 near junction 4 on Albany Park) are in Camberley; Alfa Laval is on the Yorktown Ind Est, in York Town off the A331 near Stihl with a technical centre of Toshiba on the other side of the A331; to the south on Watchmoor Park off the A331 are Adaptec and Fluor and Zodiac Aerospace. Further south in Frimley Green, home to the Lakeside Leisure Complex, between the B3411 and the railway is SC Johnson and its Glade air freshener factory. Opposite Albany Park over the A331 is Frimley Business Park, with Advanced Micro Devices, off M3 junction 4 next to the A331; nearby is Novartis Pharmaceuticals UK (Sandoz) and Alcon. Further along the A325 towards Frimley at the B311 roundabout is Siemens (the former site of Marconi Command & Control Systems, then BAE Systems Insyte). Frimley has Amer Sports (the world's largest sporting equipment manufacturer) on the B3411 Lyon Way Ind Estate, with VMware. Zoggs is in Lightwater, near the M3 Bagshot Interchange.

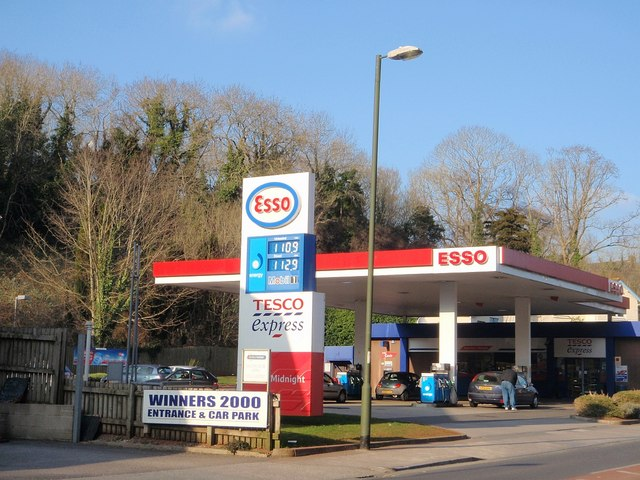
Esso is based in Leatherhead; Esso have around 1,100 petrol stations in the UK - 14% of all stations, and pays around £7bn in UK tax, and own the Brent oil field; the site is also the worldwide base of ExxonMobil Aviation Fuels and Marine.

ExxonMobil (Esso), part of the largest oil company in the world, is in the east of Leatherhead, next to the M25 towards Ashtead at ExxonMobil House, off the A24. In the town the Wates Group nearby, Unilever Bestfoods (in Crawley before 2008), and to the south is Robert Dyas; Puma is east of Unilever near the M25 and A243. Harsco is off the B2430. On the B2122 in Fetcham, to the west of Leatherhead, is the UK division of Carrier, the world leaders (and originators) of air conditioning. Rowlett Rutland in Bookham is Britain's only manufacturer of (commercial-size) toasters, next to Bookham railway station and Photo-Me International. Leatherhead Food International moved to Epsom in the mid-2010s.

Although BP has its international headquarters in central London, most of its UK division (chemicals and energy) with Air BP (aviation fuel) is headquartered at Sunbury-on-Thames, and the UK's third largest company by stock market value; nearby is Kingston Technology Europe (the world's second largest producer of flash memory), just inside the Surrey boundary; ADT is at the end of the M3 in Sunbury, and Chubb is on the other side of the roundabout, and M3. Enterprise Rent-a-Car is near Thorpe, near to Cemex and Thorpe Park (situated on a series of former gravel pits). Shepperton Studios is next to Littleton.

Del Monte company is in Staines-upon-Thames on the side of the A30 and Dalkia is on the A308; British Gas is on the A308 in Pooley Green nearby to the west, with Salesforce at Lotus Park, next to Dow Chemical. Kerry Foods are based on the B388, east of the M25, in the south end of Pooley Green at Thorpe Lea. Cisco Videoscape, on the A308 in Birch Green.

=== Sussex ===
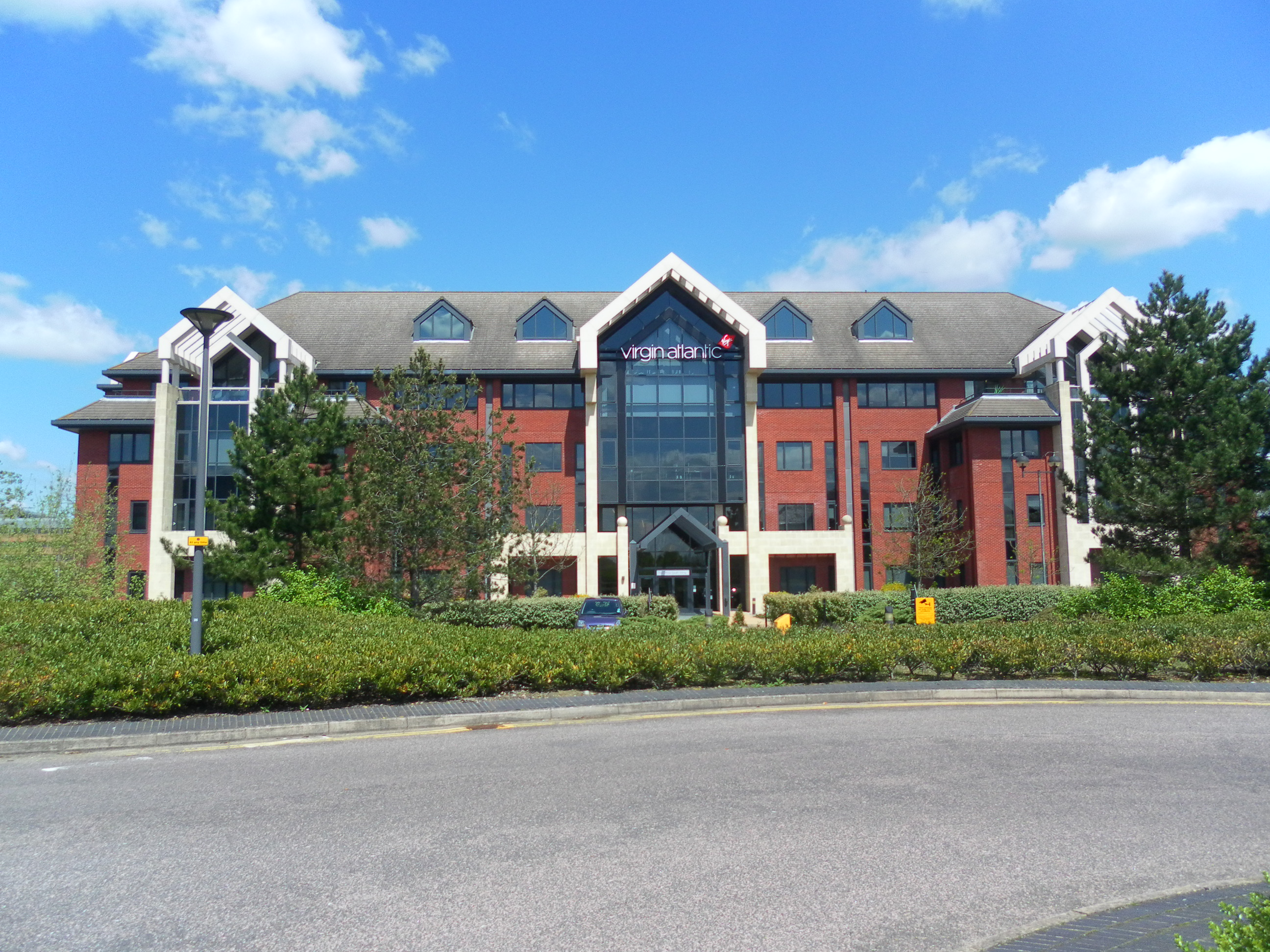
Virgin Atlantic on Manor Royal in Crawley; Virgin has 12 747s compared to BA's 56, but both have around 18 of the new Airbus 380; Gatwick now flies 40 million passengers a year, a world record for a single-runway airport.

The RSPCA is on the A24 in Southwater, south of Horsham. Campina UK is in Horsham. Dunkin' Donuts UK on the B2237 in the south of Horsham centre at the Prewett's Mill Roundabout in the same building as Beam Global UK (Bourbon whisky), and its subsidiary Thomas Lowndes & Co (formerly owned by Allied Domecq, and the UK's leading supplier of culinary alcohol). RSA Insurance Group (former Royal and Sun Alliance, and the UK's largest commercial insurer) has its main office in Horsham.

The Caravan Club is in East Grinstead, with Rentokil Specialist Hygiene, and Initial Medical Services. Roche Diagnostics UK headquarters and CAE Inc. UK are in the Victoria Business Park off the A273 in the west of Burgess Hill near Tesco; further to east is the HQ of Filofax, and Heidenhain GB, who make linear encoders for CNC machines.

Southern Water is on the A2032 in Durrington, Worthing; Durrington Bridge House on the Barrington Road Ind Estate, next to Durrington-on-Sea railway station, in Goring-by-Sea has HMRC's national office for its Voluntary Arrangement Service (former Enforcement & Insolvency Service, for IVAs) and members voluntary liquidation, company administrations, and voluntary arrangements. GSK in east Worthing is the former Beecham Pharmaceuticals, on the western edge of Sompting, which makes antibiotics such as Augmentin; to the south of GSK on the same estate is Electronic Temperature Instruments, a worldwide manufacturer of thermometers, and the UK's largest manufacturer of digital thermometers. B & W is an important loudspeaker company in the north of Worthing at the A2032/A24 junction in West Tarring. Eurotherm make temperature controllers.

Virgin Atlantic is off the A23, with Paslode UK (nail guns) next-door, on the Manor Royal Ind Estate in the north of Crawley, as is Edwards (former BOC Edwards), an international engineering company that makes vacuum pumps, with another plant on the A259 in Kingston by Sea, Shoreham. Also on Manor Royal are the headquarters of Spirent, G4S, Doosan Babcock Energy, Pilz UK and TUI Travel PLC with TUI Airline Management (the fifth largest European air carrier). Air Miles (now called Avios since November 2011) is on Fleming Way Roundabout of the A23 north of Crawley in the former headquarters of British Caledonian, at County Oak retail park, and to the west is the British Dualit brand of catering electrical equipment (iconic toasters).

Nestlé UK is moving its headquarters from City Place Gatwick to Manor Royal Business District in Crawley from September 2023. To the south, on the east of Manor Royal, is Monier Redland (roof tiles) and ARINC UK (avionics), and a large site of Thales, with its civilian aircraft simulation TTS division (former Redifon) now owned since 2012 by L-3 Communications); much of Thales in Crawley is the former Mullard, who made radars, and Thomson Racal Defence Electronics (and Thorn EMI); Thales in Crawley make much of the Royal Navy's electronic (mission) systems. UK Power Networks (electrical operator for region) is south of Manor Royal in Three Bridges; SEEBOARD was based on the A23 in Broadfield. Invensys have many sites in Crawley. WesternGeco (geophysical services) is at the end of the Gatwick Interchange M23 spur.

Colas Ltd (road engineering) is in Worth, east of Crawley. The former ICI Agrochemicals research department was at the Fernhurst Research Station (later part of Zeneca) at Fernhurst. Wiley UK (reference books) is in Chichester (off the A286) next door to Shippam's Foods. Rolls-Royce Motor Cars make vehicles at Westhampnett off the A27. Vie at Home is at Tangmere; Philips Respironics UK is at Tangmere airfield. Hayes UK make plumbing supplies on the Huffwood Trading Est on the other side of the railway.

MTU UK (diesel engine generators, owned by Rolls-Royce Power Systems) are on the Birches Ind Est at the A22/A264 junction in Felbridge; nearby are Thermo Fisher Scientific UK and Jencons UK (owned by VWR International). Cats Protection is at the National Cat Centre on the A275 in Danehill in the Ashdown Forest. The Body Shop is at the A259/B2187 Body Shop Roundabout in Toddington, Littlehampton. Palmer and Harvey is in Hove and Hosiden Besson, near Aldrington railway station, makes telephone equipment; a Legal & General main office is on the A2023 next to Hove Park. C Dugard (CNC machines) is at the A2023/A270 junction. American Express UK is in Brighton. EDO MBM near Moulsecoomb railway station makes electrical equipment for the Brimstone missile. Elektromotive is at Falmer (electric vehicle charging).

Jones Bootmaker head office is based in Eastbourne; Alfa Laval UK have a manufacturing plant at Birch Road Ind Est, off the A2290 near the A259 roundabout. Ricardo plc, the engineering consultancy, is on the A27 next to Shoreham Airport and River Adur. Merrydown cider was formerly made in Horam until 2004, when it was bought by SHS Group of Belfast. Páramo Directional Clothing and Nikwax are on the B2099 in Durgates, in Wadhurst, East Sussex, towards the Kent boundary. Notifier UK (fire alarms, owned by Honeywell) is in South Malling in Lewes, also the HQ of Morley-IAS UK, who make fire alarm control panels.

== Culture ==
The culture of South East England has been influenced a number of factors: by its part of contributing to the "idealised English identity", due to the region's historic idyllic rural landscape; its serving for Greater London as commuting hinterland, and, in recent times, the concentration of the UK's creative industry across the South East as well as London.

=== Literature, TV puppetry and animation, cinema, music and cuisine ===
Ashdown Forest in East Sussex was the inspiration for the Hundred Acre Wood in the Winnie-the-Pooh stories by A.A. Milne who also lived in the nearby village of Hartfield and visited the forest with his son Christopher Robin. Alice Liddell, also known as Alice Hargreaves, the inspiration for Alice in Lewis Carroll's Alice's Adventures in Wonderland, spent the majority of her childhood living in Oxford, and in her later years lived in and around Lyndhurst, Hampshire after her marriage to Reginald Hargreaves. She is buried in the graveyard of St Michael and All Angels Church in the town. Roger Hargreaves lived in Lower Sunbury on the River Thames on the next to Richmond upon Thames borough boundary, and wrote his Mr. Men books. Mary Tourtel from Canterbury created Rupert Bear. Frank Hampson, of Dan Dare, drew all his pictures when he lived in the east of Epsom, off the A2022. Buckinghamshire's E. L. James, author of the erotic romance Fifty Shades Trilogy, has the UK record for the fastest-selling paperback of all time.

Trumpton (1967) was based on Plumpton, East Sussex, with other titles in the series based on nearby villages; Trumpton was actually shot by Gordon Murray's company in Crouch End, London. Gerry Anderson's AP Films filmed Thunderbirds on the Slough Trading Estate near to the site's cooling towers, being first broadcast in 1965. The Native American woman Pocahontas is buried at St George's Church, Gravesend in Kent and was the inspiration for the popular Disney animated film of the same name.

The first multiplex cinema in the UK was in Milton Keynes, in the mid-1980s.

Elgar wrote his Cello Concerto at Fittleworth, West Sussex, in 1919. Isaac Watts, a hymn writer from Southampton, wrote When I Survey the Wondrous Cross and O God, Our Help in Ages Past. John Goss, who wrote the hymn tune for Praise, My Soul, the King of Heaven, came from Fareham. At Chalfont St Giles, Milton finished Paradise Lost. Olney in Buckinghamshire is known for the Olney Hymns - Amazing Grace, and for Henry Gauntlett, the composer of the tune of Once in Royal David's City. The Christian non-profit music festival Big Church Day Out takes place annually on the last Saturday and Sunday of May at Wiston House, Wiston in West Sussex.

Pimm's was invented by James Pimm of Kent in the 1820s. Banoffee pie was invented in 1972 in Jevington in East Sussex. Maria Ann Smith from Sussex emigrated to Australia and created the Granny Smith apple. Horticulturist Richard Cox lived in Colnbrook, where he bred his Cox's Orange Pippin, a popular apple. Elizabeth David, a cookery writer who revolutionised the nation's home cooking in the 1950s, came from Sussex.

=== Media ===
==== Television ====
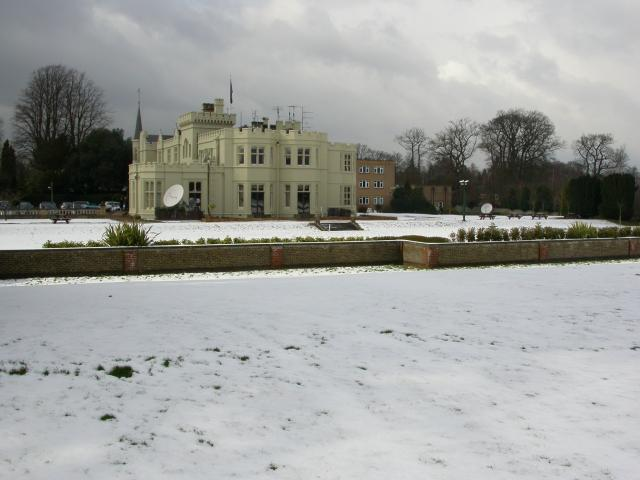
BBC Research was based until 2010 in Kingswood Warren near Reigate in Surrey on the A217, which was responsible for developing stereo and HD TV broadcasts and teletext.

The BBC operate South Today (BBC South) out of Havelock Road, Southampton and South East Today (BBC South East) from Tunbridge Wells, Kent. ITV News Meridian (ITV Meridian) which has sub-regions for the South and South East based in Whiteley, near Fareham.

  - Television coverage for Buckinghamshire is complex and is split three ways depending on location. The western part of the county is in the BBC South and ITV Meridian (Thames Valley sub-region). Much of Milton Keynes UA is covered by BBC East based in Norwich, with the Look East programme; similarly the ITV region for most of Milton Keynes is ITV Anglia with the ITV News Anglia programme, also from Norwich. South of the county is covered by BBC London News and ITV London News which both broadcast from London.
- That's Solent TV, a subsidiary TV station from That's TV based in Portsmouth, covers Portsmouth, Isle of Wight, Southampton and Winchester.

==== Radio ====
- BBC Local Radio services in the region include Berkshire, Surrey, Sussex, Solent, Oxford, and Kent, with Buckinghamshire & Milton Keynes served by BBC Three Counties Radio (which also covers Hertfordshire and Bedfordshire, and falls under the BBC East region).
- Commercial radio stations include:
  - Heart South serves much of the region, created in 2019 by the combination of Heart Sussex and Surrey (formerly Heart Sussex of Brighton and Mercury FM in Crawley), Heart Thames Valley (Heart Berkshire and Heart Oxfordshire), Heart South Coast (Heart Dorset and New Forest and Heart Hampshire), and Heart Kent. Milton Keynes is served by - and is the studio base of - Heart East (via the former Heart 103.3/Horizon Radio)
  - Capital South (previously known as Galaxy South Coast/Power FM based in Segensworth and Juice 107.2 in Brighton)
  - Greatest Hits Radio South operates on the former frequencies of The Breeze (previously Andover Sound, Newbury Sound (former Kick FM), Reading 107 FM, and Kestrel FM (Basingstoke)), Spirit FM (Chichester), and 96.4 Eagle Radio (Guildford). In Buckinghamshire, Greatest Hits Radio East took the place of Mix 96 (Aylesbury) on FM and this was added to the Herts/Beds/Bucks DAB multiplex.
  - Greatest Hits Radio South Coast, formerly regional adult contemporary station Wave 105 in South Hampshire and East Dorset, and following its transition to GHR (with its own dedicated breakfast and afternoon shows separate from those on the other stations in the South) also broadcasts on the former Wessex FM and Vale FM frequencies in Dorset, which previously carried GHR South and GHR West respectively. Broadcast from the same studio complex as GHR South, the former Wave 105 base at Fareham
  - Nation Broadcasting operates two services based in Southampton: Nation Radio South Coast (a regional station, previously broadcasting as Greatest Hits Radio South Coast, Sam FM, JACK FM and Original 106), and Easy Radio South Coast (former Hits Radio South Coast, 107.4 The Quay, Portsmouth; The Saint, Southampton; and Dream 107.2, Winchester).
  - More Radio is broadcast on four frequencies in Sussex, previously Arrow FM (Hastings), Bright 106.4 FM (Burgess Hill), Sovereign FM (Hailsham), and Splash FM (Worthing). A countywide service broadcasts on DAB, alongside from 2021 a digital-first sibling station, More Radio Retro.
  - Isle of Wight Radio
  - KMFM, a network of seven stations in Kent, and a countywide DAB output, since 2012 sharing all programmes from the premises of KMFM Medway
  - Milton Keynes is served by BBC Three Counties Radio, Heart FM and MKFM.

==== Newspapers ====
The region is served by Southern Daily Echo (Southampton), Portsmouth News, Hampshire Chronicle Oxford Times, Oxford Journal, Oxford Mail, Argus (Brighton), Reading Evening Post, the KM Group titles (Kent), Surrey Advertiser, Reading Chronicle, Medway News, KOS Media titles (Kent), Basingstoke Gazette (Basingstoke). and the Milton Keynes Citizen.

=== Sport ===
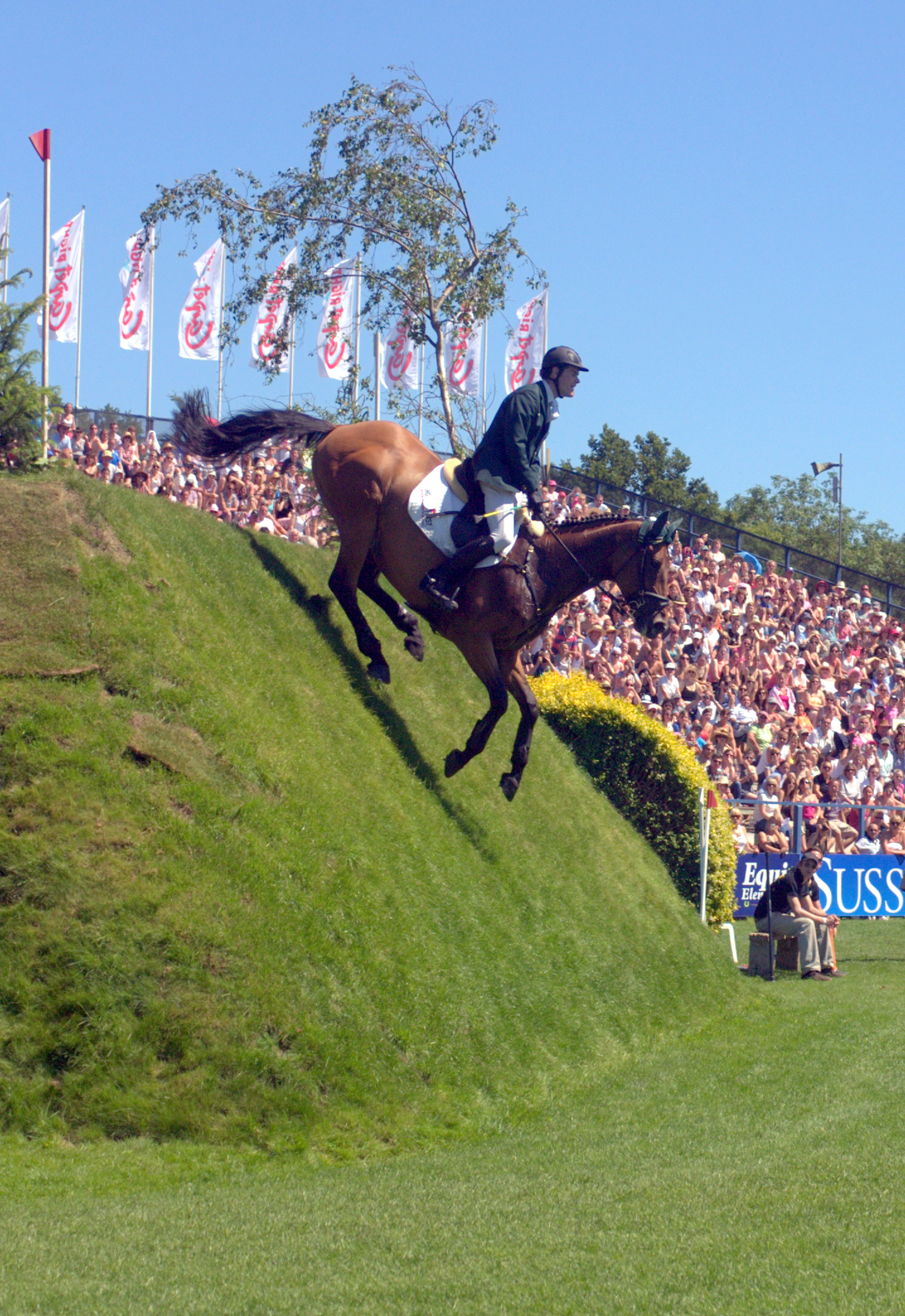
Michael Whyte on Highpark Lad at the British Jumping Derby at Hickstead in June 2011

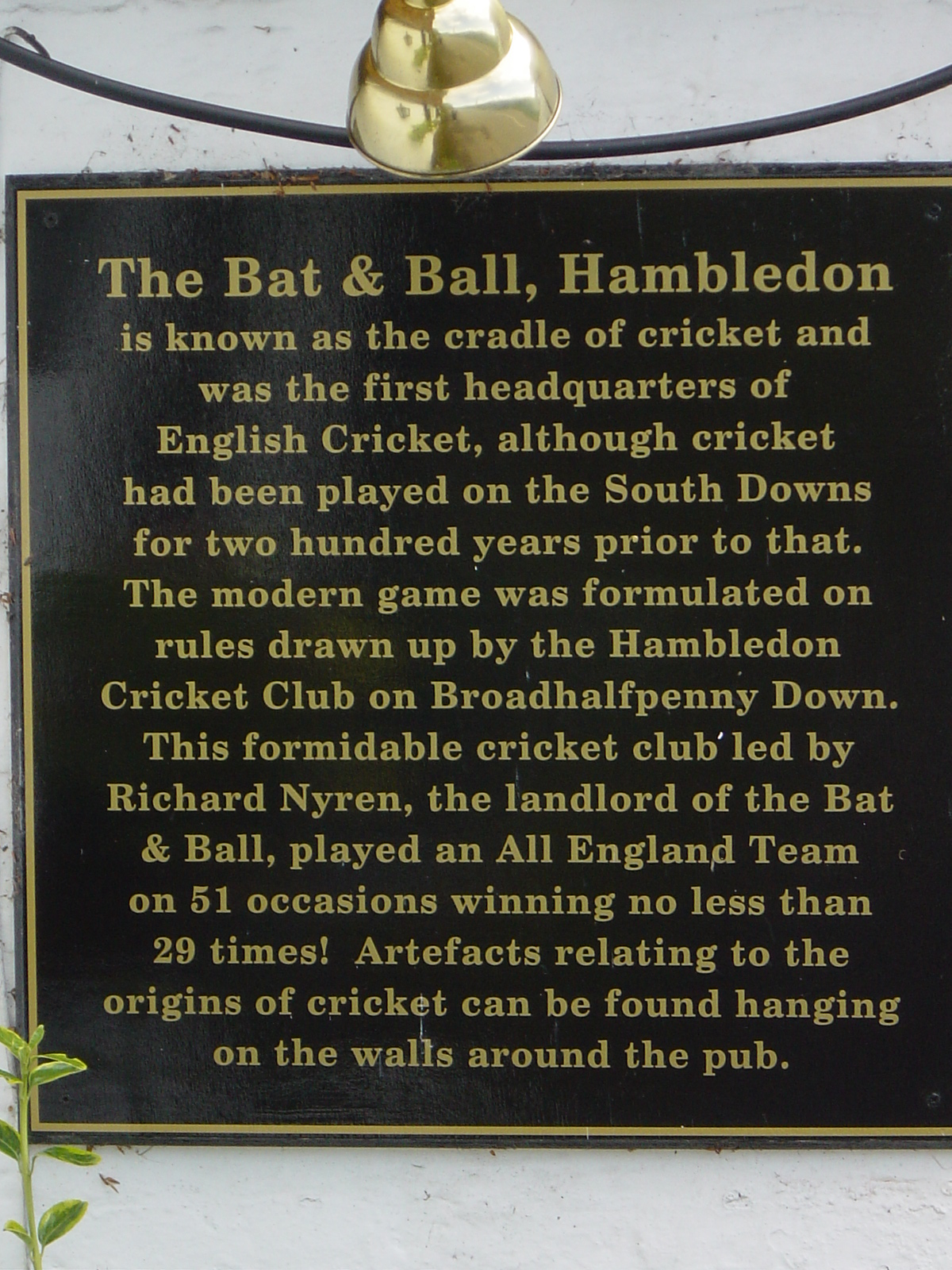
The Bat & Ball Inn, Clanfield, the birthplace of cricket

Badminton England is at Milton Keynes. The Royal Yachting Association (RYA) is headquartered at Hamble in Hampshire. The World Squash Federation is headquartered in Hastings. England Hockey is headquartered at Bisham Abbey on the south side of the Thames. The first World Transplant Games were held in Portsmouth in 1978.

The All England Jumping Course at Hickstead (Royal International Horse Show) is held (usually) at the A2300 Hickstead Interchange on the side of the A23, west of Burgess Hill, next to the River Adur in Hurstpierpoint and Sayers Common. There are many horse-racing stables on the Lambourn Downs. The Epsom Derby is held in early June. In the mid 18th century, the Hambledon Cricket Club, in south-east Hampshire, was the focal point of modern cricket. It was here where a number of innovations were made to the game until the formation of Marylebone Cricket Club and the opening of Lord's Cricket Ground in 1787.

The BDO World Darts Championship are held in early January at Lakeside Leisure Complex.

Wentworth Golf Club in Surrey is the home of the BMW PGA Championship.

Charles William Miller, who went to school in Southampton, was responsible for taking football to Brazil. He had a Scottish father and a Brazilian mother; around the same time, Alexander Watson Hutton, a Scottish teacher, had taken football to Argentina; Dresden English Football Club, founded by British workers, would bring football to Germany.

== See also ==
- Outline of England
- List of schools in the South East of England
