= BeSeatSmart Child Passenger Safety Program =

Vermont child passenger safety program

The BeSeatSmart Program is Vermont's child passenger safety program, administered by the Vermont Department of Health. The program provides information and assistance to parents and caregivers on the selection, installation and use of child safety seats and booster seats. Certified child passenger safety technicians provide free assistance through car-seat assistance stations and public car-seat check events across Vermont.

== Mission ==
BeSeatSmart is intended to improve the correct use of child restraints and seat belts and to help caregivers understand the stages of child passenger safety. The program provides education, seat-installation assistance, child passenger safety events, fitting stations and information concerning child-restraint recalls.

The program also works through a statewide network of car-seat assistance stations, where certified technicians inspect child restraints and advise caregivers on installation and use.

== History ==
BeSeatSmart began in 1994 as the KISS (Kids in Safety Seats) program. The program developed through a partnership involving the Vermont Department of Health and Grand Union Supermarkets.

In 2001, Vermont received a $35,000 grant from the Ford Motor Company to support child passenger safety activities.

The program subsequently expanded into a statewide network providing child-restraint education, seat checks and assistance to Vermont families. It continues to operate through the Vermont Department of Health.

== Vermont child passenger safety law ==
Vermont's child passenger restraint requirements are set out in 23 V.S.A. § 1258.

Under the current law:

- A child under two years of age must be properly secured in a federally approved rear-facing child restraint system with a harness.
- A child under five years of age who is not secured in a rear-facing restraint must be properly secured in a federally approved forward-facing child restraint system with a harness until reaching the manufacturer's height or weight limit.
- A child under eight years of age who is not secured in a rear-facing or forward-facing child restraint must be properly secured in a booster seat.
- A child under 18 years of age who is not using one of the child-restraint systems above must use a safety belt.
- A child under 13 years of age must, where practical, ride in a rear seat.
- A rear-facing restraint may not be used in front of an active passenger-side airbag unless the airbag has been deactivated.

The statute provides exceptions for certain vehicles used to transport passengers for hire, vehicles manufactured without safety belts and emergency evacuations ordered by an authorized official.

Civil penalties are $25 for a first violation, $50 for a second violation, and $100 for a third or subsequent violation.

== Seat safety guidance ==
BeSeatSmart organizes its guidance around stages of child passenger safety. The program advises caregivers to select a restraint appropriate for the child's age, size and developmental stage and to follow both the child-restraint manufacturer's instructions and the vehicle owner's manual.

For rear-facing seats, BeSeatSmart advises that the restraint be installed using the correct belt path and secured with either the vehicle seat belt or the LATCH system, unless otherwise permitted by the manufacturer. The harness should be snug and the shoulder straps positioned at or below the child's shoulders.

Caregivers who are unsure about installation can obtain free assistance from certified technicians at car-seat assistance stations.

== Programs and services ==
BeSeatSmart provides several forms of child passenger safety assistance, including:

- free car-seat inspections and installation assistance;
- child passenger safety check events;
- car-seat recall information;
- access to certified child passenger safety technicians;
- education for parents and caregivers; and
- referrals to car-seat assistance stations throughout Vermont.

The program also maintains a statewide schedule of child passenger safety events. Its 2026 calendar includes recurring and special car-seat check events in Vermont communities.

Certain Vermont families may also qualify for assistance obtaining a child restraint. For example, the Vermont Department of Health states that participants enrolled in WIC can receive a free car seat or booster seat after completing a child passenger safety seat inspection appointment.

== See also ==
- Child safety seat
- Infant car seat
- Injury prevention
- National Child Passenger Safety Board
- Safe Kids Worldwide
- Vermont State Police
