= Britax =

British manufacturer

Britax Childcare
- Industry: Childcare
- Genre: Child safety equipment
- Predecessor: Britax-Excelsior, BSG International
- Founded: 1938; 88 years ago
- Headquarters: 3000 Hillswood Drive, Hillswood Business Park, Chertsey, KT16 0RS, United Kingdom
- Area served: Worldwide
- Products: Child safety seats
- Owner: Nordic Capital
- Website: www.britax.com

Britax (/ˈbrɪtæks/) is a British manufacturer of childcare products including car seats, pushchairs and high chairs.

== History ==
The company began making automotive safety equipment and accessories in 1938, as well as importing car and motorcycle accessories. During the 1970s, Britax began making childcare safety products, primarily child safety seats and strollers.

=== Excelsior Motor Company ===
Excelsior Motor Company, a former motorcycle company, bought Britax Group for £880,000 in March 1963. It diversified into aircraft interiors and seating, car mirrors and car seating. Its main competitor in the 1960s was Irvin Air Chute, which had been Britain's main manufacturer and designer of parachutes.

In 1960, the BSI introduced a kite-mark BS 3254 for car seats, and Britax was one of the first to comply to the standard. In 1960, one of their seatbelts saved Donald Campbell when he crashed at 400 mph. Its belts were made from Terylene (now known as PET) made by ICI. Also in 1960 it bought the Cyclemaster motorcycle company in Byfleet.

In June 1963, it introduced a new type of seat belt that allowed the belt to move but locked in rapid deceleration, as all belts are now today, known as inertia reel, and which it called an 'automatic belt'. In the mid-1960s, Britax was based on Chertsey Road in Byfleet. In June 1966, the parent company, Excelsior Motor, bought Notek, a car light manufacturer.

=== Britax-Excelsior ===
In January 1968, due to the prominence of the Britax brand, the parent company became known as Britax-Excelsior. At this time, its main competitor was Kangol Magnet, although Britax had over 80% of the UK market. From July 1968, all new cars were required to have front passenger seat belts fitted. However, their usage was not legally required until 1983.

In January 1970, it bought Hans Kolb of Munich, Germany. The chairman was Oscar Proctor. In December 1971, it was bought by Griffiths Bentley of Staffordshire for £4.27 million. Stephen Proctor became managing director of Griffiths Bentley.

In 1973, the company acquired Römer in Germany, the year in which that company manufactured their first child seats.

=== BSG International ===
Griffiths Bentley was bought by the Bristol Street Group to become BSG International. In February 1978, this company bought Weathershields, a Birmingham sunroof manufacturer. On 3 December 1982, the Duke of Edinburgh visited Britax's factory in Chichester. The Britax brand also applied to sun-roofs. In March 1995, L.A. Rumbold the Surrey-based aircraft interiors company owned by BSG International, won a contract to manufacture all toilet modules for Boeing 737s.

==== 1980s acquisitions ====
In 1987, Britax acquired Steelcraft in Australia, a manufacturer of nursery goods. In 1988 it acquired the child safety seat business in New Zealand.

Rainsford Metal Products was an Australian company founded in 1954 in Adelaide, South Australia. Its business centred on the manufacture and distribution of industrial and automotive products, including seatbelts. At some point, Rainsfords acquired Safe-n-Sound (a South Australian company founded in 1969), after the invention and patenting of a baby safety capsule in 1984. The capsule was designed by Bob Botell, working with Rainsfords' chief engineer Bob Heath and financed by Eric Rainsford, part of the family Rainsfords.

=== Britax International ===
It was known as BSG International until May 1997, becoming Britax International. The chief executive was Richard Marton from the 1990s until November 2000, replaced by Bernard Brogan. In May 1996, it set up a joint venture with Koito Industries to make car lights for the European car market. In the late 1990s it was world leader in car safety seats and aircraft interiors.

It bought Buderus Sell, a German aircraft seat manufacturer in June 1997 for £73 million. In June 1998 it bought Public Safety Equipment of America, which made fire engine sirens, for £75 million later in August 1998, it sold its Autolease vehicle leasing company to Standard Chartered for £83 million. In April 2000, it bought Bellingham, an American aircraft interiors company, from Hexcel for £73 million. It sold its car mirrors division to Reitter & Schefenacker of Germany for £200 million.

=== Britax patents ===
Britax is the patent holder for over 180 United States granted patents.

The Isofix (known as LATCH in the US) system was developed jointly by child safety seat maker Britax-Römer and Volkswagen, with the first compatible products released in 1997. However at the US DOT's request, Britax filed a series of "Terminal Disclaimers" to waive all its ISOFIX patent rights and dedicate the patents to the public good, so the US LATCH regulations could be established in 1998.

=== Management buyout ===
In July 2001, it underwent a £441 million management buyout. In September 2005, Britax International sold its Britax Childcare division for £230 million to Carlyle Group, a private equity company. In November 2010, Carlyle sold Britax Childcare, to Nordic Capital, for a reported £450 million.

=== BOB Gear ===
In 2011, Britax acquired BOB Gear, a brand of jogging pushchairs and accessories.

==== Investigation by the Consumer Product Safety Commission ====
According to the Consumer Product Safety Commission, which relied on consumer-submitted reports, nearly 100 adults and children had been injured by the BOB jogging pushchairs from 2012 to 2018. The common problem appeared to be that the front wheel of the three-wheel pushchair fell off. According to a Consumer Product Safety Commission lawsuit, Britax had failed to disclose these accidents to regulators. The Consumer Product Safety Commission asked Britax to voluntarily recall the product, saying it was unsafe. Britax refused to do so, asserting that the product was safe. During the course of the investigation, Republicans gained a majority on the Consumer Product Safety Commission. Subsequently, Republicans on the agency kept Democratic members of the agency in the dark about the investigation into the BOB pushchairs and helped to end the case against the company in court.

== Structure ==
In addition to its headquarters in the UK, Britax has divisions based in:

- Australia – Britax Childcare, Melbourne
- Finland – Britax Pohjolan Lapset, Helsinki
- France – Britax Puériculture, Paris
- (Germany) – Britax Römer, Leipheim
- Hong Kong – Britax Childcare, Kowloon Bay
- New Zealand – Britax Childcare, Glenfield
- Sweden – Britax Nordiska Barn, Upplands Väsby
- United States – Britax Child Safety, Fort Mill, South Carolina

The European headquarters of Britax Römer Kindersicherheit GmbH is in Leipheim in southern Germany. The British headquarters are near junction 11 of the M25 near the A320 roundabout in Longcross near Chertsey, having been situated in Andover, when it was known as Britax Excelsior.

== See also ==
- Transport Research Laboratory
