= Six Point Harness =

Six Point Harness may refer to:

- six-point harness, a safety device similar to a five-point harness safety belt, but with a second belt for the legs
- 6 Point Harness, an American animation studio
