= Five-point harness =

Form of seat belt

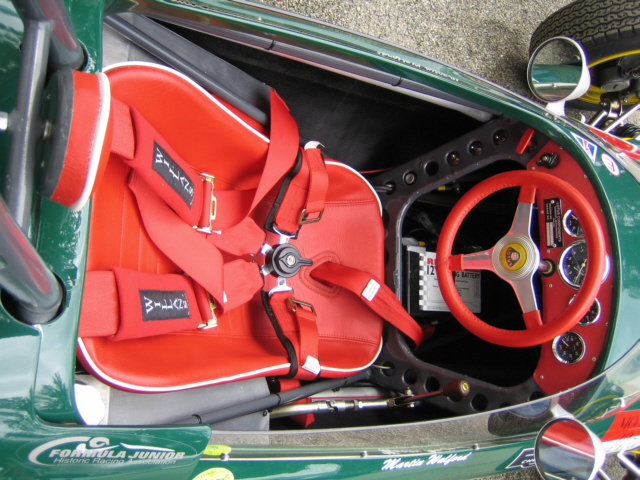
A 5-point harness in a racing car.

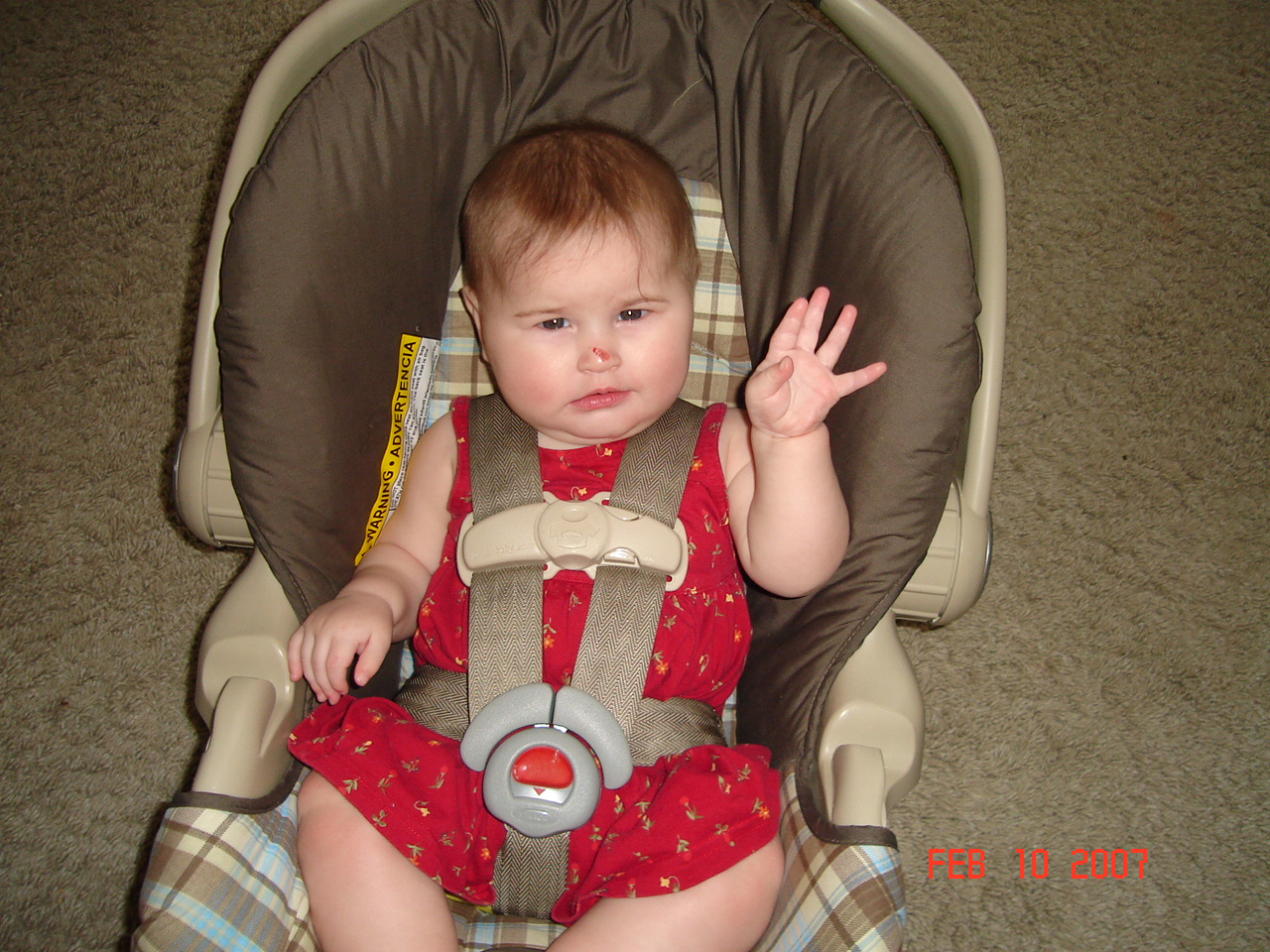
Child held in a car seat by a five-point harness

A five-point driver's harness is a form of seat belt that contains five straps that are mounted to the car frame. It has been engineered for an increase of safety in the occurrence of an automobile accident. As a result, this form of seat belt has been mandated in the race car competition of NASCAR. This was an invention made mandatory to have due to the high velocities involved in the sport. Along with the design of the seat belt, helmet straps have been designed to increase the safety of the driver. This invention has also been used to secure infants and young children in child safety seats.

== Structure ==
The five-point driver's harness is preferred as a safety mechanism for its high amount of safety compared to other designs. The five-point driver's harness consists of five straps. Two are located at the shoulders, two at the hips, and one at the crotch that all come to connect to a buckle release mechanism. This way of buckling up holds the driver's body tight in the seat, which in turn protects the upper body from injury. The only downside to this seat belt mechanism is the insecurity of the driver's head.

=== Helmet ===
There have been different models of helmets designed to hold the drivers head in place. A helmet restraint is equipped in some five-point harness seats to prevent brain and neck injury. For example, in NASCAR, it protects the driver in case of a car crash or an immediate change of velocity where the driver has limited control of his momentum. The apparatus consists of a strap that runs from both of the sides of the helmet to the vehicle; or a strap connected to the vehicle from both sides of the driver that runs across the front of the helmet, instead of two independent straps on each side attached to the helmet. The mechanism is called a HANS (head and neck support) device

=== Helmet straps ===
To prevent the helmet straps from impairing the drivers vision, there is a design where the straps are held horizontal to prevent the straps from sagging. There are also designs in which no apparatus is needed to keep straps out of the drivers sight. Helmet straps are made up of shock absorbing material used while climbing or for security when working at high elevations. The straps include a woven nylon that requires up to 475 lbs. of force to cause the straps to tear. Straps that are stretchable allow the drivers brain to slow down to avoid brain damage caused from the brain slamming into the skull; but the straps do not let the head move too far forward to cause neck injuries.

== Child seats ==
The five-point harness is also used to buckle up children in forward-facing and rear-facing seats. It is designed with the same concept of tightly holding the passenger to the seat with the use of five different straps but built for the young children. This form of seat harness for young children "should be a default standard" when children are present in a motor vehicle according to Phil Wilson. The reason there have been a number of injured young children and infants in survivable accidents is due to incorrect use of the Child Safety Seat (CSS).

To assist caregivers in the safe transportation of children, the USA National Child Passenger Safety Board maintains the quality and integrity of the National Child Passenger Safety Certification Training Program. The program is used to train and certify child passenger safety technicians and instructors. Three of the most common issues that put children at risk: improperly used or installed safety seats, children left in hot cars, and teen drivers.
