= Child Passenger Safety Week =

Child Passenger Safety Week is observed the third week of September as part of Baby Safety Month in the United States. The goal of Child Passenger Safety Week is to make sure every child is in the correct child safety seat, that the seats are properly installed and used, and that seats are registered with their manufacturers to ensure parents and caregivers receive important safety updates.

Child Passenger Safety Week begins with Child Passenger Safety Technician (CPST) Appreciation Day and concludes with National Seat Check Saturday. During the week, CPSTs, child safety seat manufacturers, and nonprofit and governmental organizations share safety advice, conduct seat checks, offer community educational opportunities, and generally collaborate to reduce preventable child injury or death.

== See also ==
- Child safety seat
- Safe Kids Worldwide
- National Highway Traffic Safety Administration (NHTSA)
- Transport Canada
- National Safety Council
