= Herta Feely =

Herta Burbach Feely is a writer, editor, and child safety activist. She co-founded Safe Kids Worldwide.

== Early life ==
Feely was born to German immigrants in Yugoslavia, and grew up in Germany and the United States in the 1960s and 1970s. She attended Brentwood High School in Brentwood, Missouri, and graduated from Parkway High School in Chesterfield, Missouri, then earned a B.A. in Latin American history and completed all coursework toward a master's degree in journalism from the University of California-Berkeley, and a M.A. in writing from Johns Hopkins University in Baltimore. Feely is married and has two sons and has lived and worked in the Washington, D.C., area since 1982.

== Safe Kids ==
In 1986, Feely was working as a public relations consultant for the television documentary The Children's War, about the work of the Children's National Medical Center; a New York Times review called it "a plea for children's accident prevention". Feely and surgeon Dr. Martin R. Eichelberger collaborated on multiple projects for the hospital's trauma center, including the National Children's Accident Prevention Campaign, before developing the concept of a dedicated national nonprofit. They launched the National Safe Kids Campaign in September 1987 with five years of funding from Johnson & Johnson. United States Surgeon General C. Everett Koop served as its chairman for its first thirteen years (honorary during his Surgeon General tenure).

Feely served as the Safe Kids executive director for its first six years. She appeared before the United States Congress and was extensively quoted in national media about the Safe Kids efforts to prevent children's accidental injuries, from campaigns for bicycle helmets, to prevention of burns, to safe playground equipment, to child safety seats to many other issues.

In 2005, the National Safe Kids Campaign officially became Safe Kids Worldwide, with 21 affiliates in different countries. Feely returned to work for Safe Kids Worldwide from 2006 to 2007.

== Editing ==
In 2007 Feely launched Chrysalis Editorial Services as a sole proprietorship offering manuscript critique, writing coaching, ghostwriting, book proposal advice and support, and agent/publisher support and services. She has ghostwritten three memoirs. Authors she has helped include Lee DiPietro, Marian Wernicke, Roger Marum, Anna Koczak, Jan Cigliano, Tobias Lanz, and Cynthia Tocci.

== Writing ==
Feely's novel, Saving Phoebe Murrow, was released in the U.S. in September 2016 (Upper Hand Press), and in October 2016 in the U.K. (Twenty7 Books).

Feely's memoirs and short stories have been published in literary magazines including The Sun, Lullwater Review, Provincetown Magazine, Potomac Review, and The Griffin, and the anthology Enhanced Gravity.

In 2006, Feely received an Artist Fellowship from the D.C. Commission on the Arts and Humanities for her novel in progress, The Trials of Serra Blue. Later that year the completed novel won the annual James Jones Literary Society First Novel Fellowship of $10,000, out of 594 applicants.

Feely's The Wall: A Memoir, won the 2010 American Independent Writers Award for Best Personal Essay.

In 2010, she co-edited Confessions: Fact or Fiction? (ISBN 978-1609106096), an anthology mixing memoirs with short fiction, and published it via Chrysalis Editorial. Confessions made a St. Louis best-sellers list, and was a finalist for USA Book News best anthology of 2011.
