= Brentwood High School (Missouri) =

Public high school in Brentwood, Missouri, US

Brentwood Middle and High School
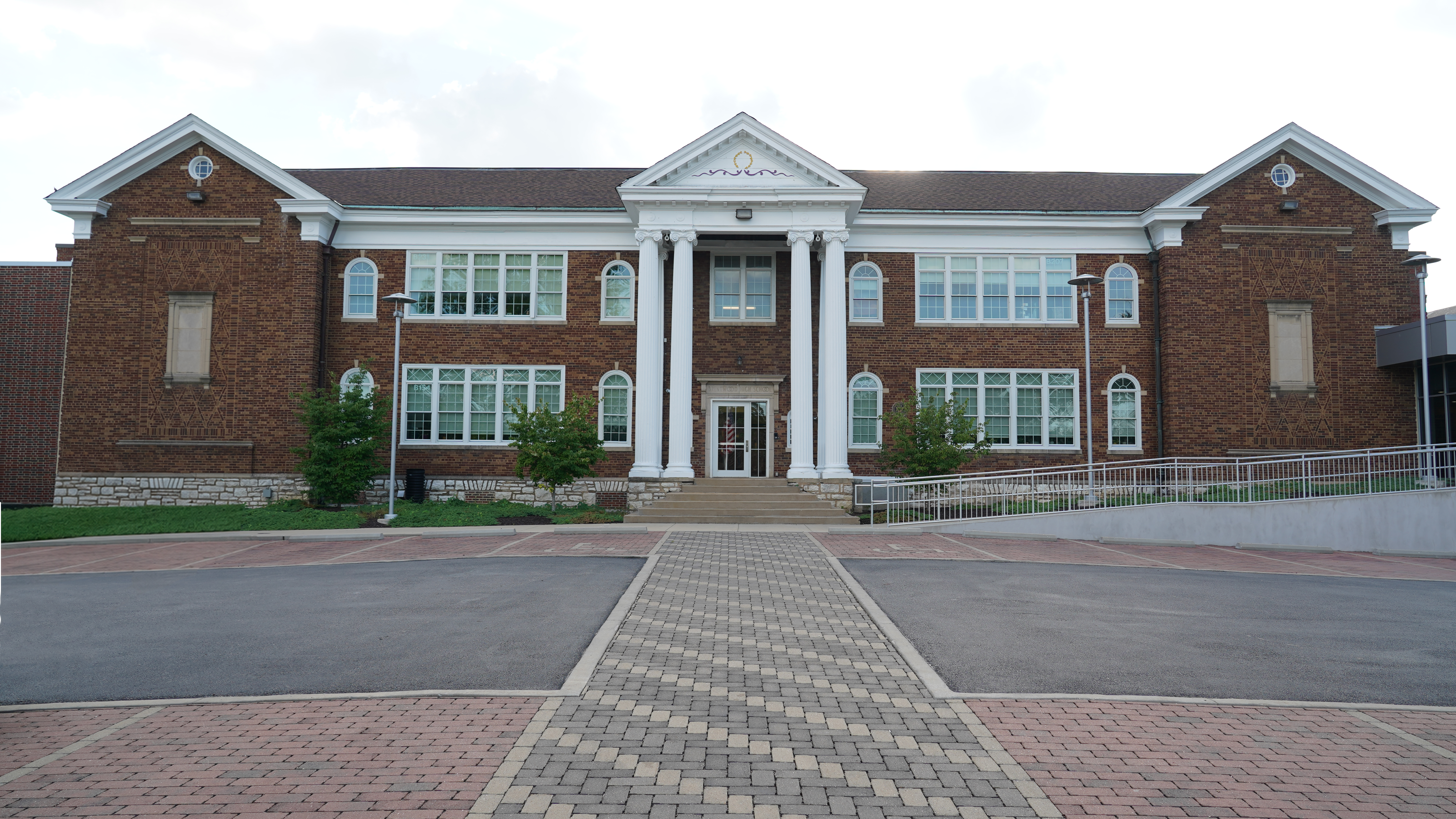

Location
- 2221 High School Drive; Brentwood, Missouri 63144; United States; 38.621°N 90.354°W

Information
- Type: Public secondary school
- Established: 1927; 99 years ago
- School district: Brentwood School District
- Principal: Gregory Fick
- Teaching staff: 22.93 (on an FTE basis)
- Grades: 9–12
- Gender: Coeducational
- Enrollment: 191 (2023–2024)
- Student to teacher ratio: 8.33
- Colors: Purple and gold
- Nickname: Eagles
- Newspaper: The Nest
- Yearbook: Eagle
- Website: bhs.brentwoodmoschools.org

Brentwood Middle and High School is a public high school in Brentwood, St. Louis County, Missouri that is part of the Brentwood School District. Brentwood High School was selected as a National Blue Ribbon School in 2006. Brentwood High School opened in 1927, and in 1961, the school district added a junior high school addition to the building.

== Activities ==
For the 2013–2014 school year, the school offered 15 activities approved by the Missouri State High School Activities Association (MSHSAA): baseball, boys and girls basketball, sideline cheerleading, field hockey, 11-man football, music activities, boys and girls soccer, softball, speech and debate, boys and girls track and field, girls volleyball, and wrestling In addition to its current activities, Brentwood students have won several state championships, including:

- Football: Runner up 2009
- Baseball: 1978, 1986
- Girls basketball: 1985
- Boys track and field: 1963, 1964, 1965, 1966, 1967, 1968, 1987, 1991
- Winter Color Guard: 2012

The school has had one state individual champions in women's cross country: Kensington Curd

The school has had 14 state individual champions in women's track and field: Kensington Curd (3200m), Sophia Rivera (Javelin, Discus, Shotput), Anietie Ekong (Long Jump), Becky Dahm (3200m), Julie Katsaras (800m, 1600m)

The school has had two state individual champions in wrestling, Rodney Carr (1973) and Greg Carr (1983).

== Alumni ==
- Ivory Crockett, world-record-setting sprinter
- Herta Feely, co-founder of Safe Kids Worldwide
- Sylk Smoov, rapper and entertainer
