= General Motors Foundation =

- Abbreviation: GM Foundation
- Formation: 1976; 50 years ago
- Defunct: 2017; 9 years ago
- Type: 501(c)(3) organization
- Affiliations: General Motors; Safe Kids Worldwide; College for Creative Studies

General Motors Foundation, Inc. was a 501(c)(3) organization and the philanthropic vehicle of General Motors from its establishment in 1976 until its termination in 2017.

Charities funded by the foundation included Safe Kids Worldwide, College for Creative Studies, and the Belle Isle Conservancy.

In 2017, General Motors eliminated the General Motors Foundation and now funds its charitable giving directly from the corporation. Jackie Parker, head of the organization, resigned in July 2017.
