= Brentwood School District =

School district in Missouri, USA

Location
- 1201 Hanley Industrial Court Brentwood, MO 63144 United States

District information
- Motto: Home of the Eagles
- Established: March 3, 1920
- Superintendent: Brian Lane
- Schools: 5
- NCES District ID: 2905880

Students and staff
- Students: 768
- Teachers: 79

Other information
- Website: http://www.brentwoodmoschools.org/

Brentwood School District serves Brentwood, Missouri and is home to a national blue ribbon winning High School, Brentwood High School.

== About ==
Founded in 1920, BSD serves all of Brentwood. BSD has 768 students with 79 teachers over 5 schools. The student demographics are 60% Caucasian, 20% African American, 6% Asian, 5% Latino and 9% Other/Multiracial. The graduation rate is 95%. Missouri Department of Elementary and Secondary Education reported Brentwood School District as the only school district in the St. Louis Area to get 100% on academic health

== List of Schools ==
Pre-K

- Brentwood Early Childhood Center

Elementary

- McGrath Elementary
- Mark Twain Elementary

Middle

- Brentwood Middle

High School

- Brentwood High School
