= Vermont State Police =

American law enforcement agency

- Patch of Vermont State Police

- Flag of the State of Vermont
- Abbreviation: VSP

Agency overview
- Formed: July 1, 1947; 79 years ago
- Preceding agency: Department of Motor Vehicles Highway Patrol
- Employees: 444 (2026)

Jurisdictional structure
- Operations jurisdiction: Vermont, USA
- Vermont State Police Stations
- Area: 9,620 square miles (24,900 km^{2})
- Population: 626,242 (2015 est)
- General nature: Civilian police

Operational structure
- Headquarters: Waterbury, Vermont
- Troopers: 334
- Agency executive: Colonel Shawn Loan, Director
- Parent agency: Vermont Department of Public Safety

Website
- vsp.vermont.gov

The Vermont State Police (VSP) is the state police agency for the U.S. state of Vermont. The force has jurisdiction throughout the entire state. The Vermont Public Safety Commission directs policy and selects the commander. The commander is Colonel Matthew Birmingham. The Commissioner of the Vermont Department of Public Safety is Michael Schirling. There are 332 sworn state troopers.

== History ==
Prior to 1947, Vermont law enforcement was county based. Each of the state's fourteen counties had an elected sheriff responsible for providing all law enforcement services to towns in the county without their own police departments. Opposition to establishing a state police force existed, partly based on the state's low crime statistics, a reluctance to add new state spending, and a suspicion of unelected centralized authority.

On the state level, only the Department of Motor Vehicles Highway Patrol provided centralized, statewide law enforcement services. Members of that department patrolled the state's roadways on motorcycles enforcing motor vehicle law and investigating accidents. Infractions not related to use of a highway or the safe operation of a motor vehicle had to be referred to a county authority.

Communication with Highway Patrol members prior to the use of police radios was accomplished through posting of signs in public places. This method of communicating required a strong relationship with the public that was being served. Highway Patrol Officers would call their stations for messages about accidents or the status of motor vehicle complaints when signs were posted. Today this close association with the public would be considered community policing.

The seed of the movement that would become a Department of Public Safety was first planted in 1935 when a special committee was formed to study the feasibility of a statewide police system. The results of this study were positive and support began to grow. The Vermont State Grange, at the time a powerful group, and many farmers were among the early supporters of a statewide law enforcement agency. The first bill to establish a Department of Public Safety was introduced in the 1937 biennial session of the Vermont General Assembly. It was defeated. The defeat of the original proposal has been attributed to lobbying by the sheriffs who perceived a loss of power and a conservative legislature with a tight hold on the purse strings.

The disappearance in 1946 of Paula Jean Welden, an eighteen-year-old Bennington College student, resulted in changes to the attitudes of many opponents of the formation of a Department of Public Safety. Bennington county officials were unsuccessful in locating the student and were forced to call on state police investigators from Connecticut and New York for assistance. Local investigators and the state police forces from Connecticut and New York were at a loss for clues in the case so the Governor of Vermont called the Federal Bureau of Investigation (FBI). The case was never solved. This case, plus Governor Ernest W. Gibson's efforts ended a decade-long struggle with the Vermont General Assembly passing Act No. 163. The agency authority was constituted on July 1, 1947, and styled "the Vermont Department of Public Safety."

=== Establishing the department ===
Major General Merritt A. Edson, a former U.S. Marine and Medal of Honor recipient in World War II, formed the Department of Public Safety and became the first commissioner. The original strength authorized for the department was 169, with 37 civilians and 125 troopers. This class of troopers tallied a total of 606 years of service to the people of Vermont before retiring.

=== Establishing uniforms ===
The Vermont State Police uniform was modeled on the U.S. Marine Corps uniform of the mid-twentieth century, but adopted Vermont's state colors of green and gold, and remains a lasting legacy of Major General Edson.

Twenty-seven officers from the Department of Motor Vehicles Highway Patrol were incorporated into the new department. Troopers were outfitted with khaki shirts with contrasting shoulder passant, cuffs, and pocket lapels on Fern green and trimmed in Old Gold galloon. A Fern green necktie is worn. A cloisonné coat of arms of Vermont in gold and enamel is worn on the shirt collars. Most members of the force wore Fern green breeches with a single or double Old Gold colored leg stripe, wool tunics of the same colors, a black Sam Browne belt and jackboot. The uniform remains with little modification. The Second World War association of breeches and jackboots with Nazism caused many U.S. state and municipal forces to curtail use of breeches and jackboots except for mounted horse and motor patrols. In Vermont both troopers and game wardens of the state's Department of Fish and Game switched from the breeches and high polished black boots to tailored trousers, retaining the Old Gold leg stripes.

The stripes of senior officers, that rank below lieutenant, are sewn onto the uniform pointing down, or similar to the British military forces and British police forces. This makes the VSP one of few American police departments that do so.

=== Initial headquarters ===
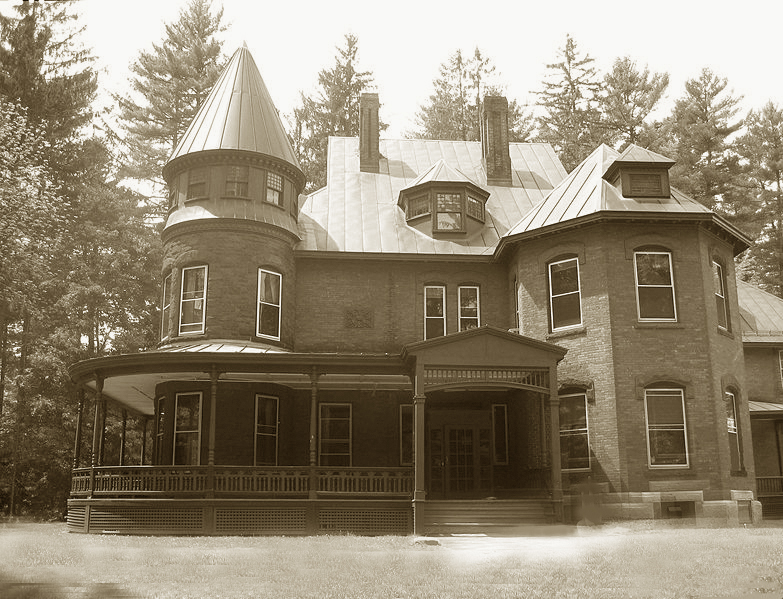
Redstone, the first headquarters of the Vermont Department of Public Safety

The first headquarters was established February 9, 1948, at Redstone in the state capital of Montpelier. For the price of $25,000, the State bought the building and 10 acres (40,000 m^{2}) of land. The photo lab was housed in the basement and equipped with state-of-the-art equipment. Housing the photo laboratory in the basement had a number of unanticipated consequences. Spring thaw and heavy rains flooded the cellar and personnel had to wear rubber boots and wade through the runoff.

=== Growth and development ===
The first State Police radio system was completed September 28, 1948. For the first time, a three-way radio system allowed stations to talk to each other and to patrol cars. The radio system did eliminate the need to post signs in public places. The year 1949 saw the creation of the Fire Prevention Division and the Identification and Records Division. The fleet was enlarged in 1948. The department purchased 25 Ford sedans, two Pontiac sedans, and one Pontiac coupe for a total price of $14,742.41.

The State Police improved police services through training, public relations and safety education. The department became visible through appearances at fairs, in schools and civic gatherings. School safety patrols were started. For many years, end of the year school patrol picnics were a well-earned treat for the volunteers. Troopers joined these picnics serving hot dogs and ice cream to the students. General Edson resigned in mid-1951 after four years of valuable service.

A number of changes came to the growing department in the mid-1950s.

The Field Force Division started using radar as a speed enforcement tool in 1954. Two bloodhounds joined the force and made contributions in searches and rescues. The Crime Lab began to use color photography as an identification tool. A new radio microwave installation was completed between Headquarters and the Rutland District Office.

The department expanded into the polygraph field at about the same time. The first polygraph instrument was purchased and Trooper Glenn Davis became the state's first licensed polygrapher. Before this the department had to use facilities and examiners in neighboring states. The first year of polygraph operation 115 examinations were requested by law enforcement agencies.

In the 1960s socio-economic changes took place with long-term effects on the capacities of law enforcement. The four season recreation industry created economic growth, and resulted in increased out-of-state visitors. Labor Day in the 1940s and 50s meant the end of heavy traffic, but during the early 1960s that changed as Vermont became the destination for fall foliage, hunting, skiing and snowmobiling. The departmental strength was 118 State Police and 60 civilians at the beginning of 1960. The state's population was 389,881. There were 41.4 miles (66.6 km) of Interstate highway compared with 320 miles (510 km) in 1998.

Between 1960 and 1970 licensed drivers increased by 35%, the number of registered vehicles increased by 51%, and the interstate system was completed with 320 miles (510 km) of divided highway.

The drug culture evolved in the 1960s. The department handled an increased number of complaints involving illegal drugs. By the late 1960s drugs had become a significant Vermont problem. The department and the legislature recognized the growing problem. The Legislature approved a Drug Abuse Control Program. The goal of the program was education, inspection and enforcement. The department conducted 56 drug investigations in 1968. That number had grown to 374 by 1970.

Also in 1970, the department went on line with the FBI National Crime Information Center. NCIC messages increased from 430 in 1968 to 1,036 in 1970.

Events of the 1960s led to the creation of a number of special teams and programs to meet the diverse needs of the population. A Marine Division was formed and became active in 1960. By 1966 it had five outboard motor patrol boats and a 35-foot (11 m) cruiser to patrol the State's waterways. A Search and Rescue Team was organized to look for lost persons and conduct rescues in our mountainous terrain.

The department grew to 193 State Police and 85 civilians by June 30, 1970. The early 1970s saw the Crime Lab expanded to offer forensic chemistry. The first civilian, a chemist toxicologist, began to replace sworn police officers in the crime lab. A mobile crime laboratory was constructed to provide forensic services in the field.

The department had six undercover officers in the 1970s. Long hair, dirty jeans, and thong sandals provided cover while they worked in narcotic interdiction.

Executive Order Number 35 issued in May, 1971, turned the Pittsford Sanatorium over to the department for use as a law enforcement training facility. A Canine Unit was established to provide patrol dogs. The department had only tracking bloodhounds before this. The Identification and Records Division changed its name to the Vermont Criminal Information Center and became the official state repository for all criminal records, photographs, descriptions, and fingerprints. Capturing of this data was all done manually; not until 1976 was computer equipment purchased which allowed statewide access to the information. Data requests averaged 40 a day in the 70s compared to the current 271,000.

The department hired the first two women troopers in 1977. In 2012 there were a 20 female Vermont State Troopers, encompassing various positions to include BCI, Child Abuse and Neglect investigators, training and recruitment, arson investigator, patrol commander, and patrol Troopers in 1998.

Federal funds allowed for the creation of an Interstate Troop in 1977 to provide the speed enforcement of the 55 mph (89 km/h) program. A fraud unit was established in the 70s to investigate white collar crime. A newly constituted scuba dive team recovered drowning victims or evidence.

The Fire Prevention Division was abolished and its functions transferred to the Department of Labor and Industry. An Arson Unit was formed with the responsibility for investigation of all suspicious fires in the State.

By the end of the decade the Vermont's population had grown to 477,427. There were 383,108 registered vehicles and 352,715 licensed drivers. Department strength grew to 259 State Police and 120 civilians.

Headquarters moved to the Vermont State Office Complex at Waterbury from Montpelier in the Spring of 1983.

The Communications Division had designed and installed a statewide microwave and telecommunications system. These services were provided by the department in support of all state agencies.

In late 1987 the department was selected to administer a drug control and systems improvement grant from the federal government. This grant funded the first multi-jurisdictional drug task force in Vermont. The State Police transferred the Special Investigations Unit drug investigators into a new task force with a number of local departments supplying full-time investigators.

In the 1990s the Department of Public Safety reorganized. Reorganization resulted in updating of rank of trooper, consolidation and reduction in the number of positions, sworn positions being replaced by civilians and the creation of the Criminal Justice Services Division to replace the State Police Support Services Division. The Vermont Criminal Information Center started the automation of criminal records in 1995. Records were automated and included all information on file for a person, eliminating the need for manually searching the files.

Technological advances incorporated by the department allowed conversion to infrared driving while intoxicated (DWI) processing equipment, establish a DNA analysis capability in the forensic laboratory and install a computer aided dispatch (CAD) records management system.

=== Commissioners ===
1. Merritt A. Edson 1947–1951, a retired Marine Major General
2. William H. Baumann 1951–1965. At thirty-one years old, he became the youngest State Police Commissioner in the nation.
3. E.A. Alexander 1965–1970. He held the rank of colonel. Alexander was the only appointed Commissioner who had been a Trooper promoted to Commissioner, having begun his career with the Motor Vehicle Highway Patrol in 1929.
4. E.W. Corcoran 1970–1977
5. Francis E. Lynch (1977–1979)
6. Warren Cone (1979–1980) and, for a short period of time, former Commissioner Baumann returned to the ranks.
7. Paul R. Philbrook 1980–1984
8. Charles A. Bristow 1984–1985
9. A. James Walton, Jr. 1985–2003
10. Kerry L. Sleeper 2003–2008
11. Thomas R. Tremblay 2008–2011
12. Keith W. Flynn 2011–2017
13. Thomas Anderson 2017–2019
14. Michael Schirling 2019 – 2022
15. Jennifer Morrison 2022 - Current

=== Commanders ===
1. Colonel Robert Horton
2. Colonel Lane Marshall
3. Colonel John Sinclair
4. Colonel Thomas Powlovich
5. Colonel James W. Baker 2006–2009
6. Colonel Thomas L'Esperance 2009–2015
7. Colonel Matthew Birmingham 2015 – 2026
8. Colonel Shawn Loan 2026 - Current

== Marine Division ==
The Vermont State Police has a Marine Division to patrol Lake Champlain, support the SCUBA team, and help the Search and Rescue team. In addition to policing and patrolling the Lake, they hold classes on Boater Safety to ensure the waterways are safe. They also work closely with the Coast Guard unit stationed in Burlington, Vermont.

It was formed in 1960 alongside several other "Special Teams", such as the SCUBA team, and by the Mid-60s they had 5 out-board motor boats, and a 35-foot cruiser for use on Vermont's waterways.

== Rank structure ==
As a paramilitary organization, the Vermont State Police uses a formal rank structure to reflect members' positions and levels of responsibility. The State Police uniform and rank structure is modeled after that of the United States Marine Corps.

The department has three divisions: Field Force, Support Services, and Criminal Division.

Field Force is divided into two troops, A (north) and B (south). A captain commands each troop. Within each troop are five barracks. A lieutenant commands each barracks, and each barracks has several sergeants. Barracks have a varying number of assigned troops based on patrol area size, call volume, and other police coverage. These troopers are the front-line uniform troopers that form the backbone of the State Police. They handle a variety of calls, ranging from traffic hazards, disturbances, domestics, traffic stops, 911 emergencies, crashes, assaults, etc. They are typically first on scene for many major incidents and support surrounding police agencies with cases outside of their scope of capabilities. Field Force members are often referred to as the "Tip of the Spear" and are the model law enforcement officers in the State.

The Criminal Division is divided into North and South, then into four areas across the state: NE, SE, SW, and NW. One captain commands the North and South, and each quadrant is assigned a Lieutenant. Within each area, a varying number of Detective Sergeants and Troopers handle assigned cases. These cases include missing persons, assaults against children, dead bodies, sex assaults, crimes in detention centers, large fraud and misconduct, etc. Within the criminal division are other specialty units such as Major Crimes, which handles homicides and police-involved shootings, the Narcotics Unit, the Technology Unit, and many others.

The Support Services Division oversees recruitment, hiring, standards, and trooper training. This division is headquartered at the Office of Professional Development attached to the Vermont Police Academy in Pittsford, commanded by a Major/Captain/Lt/5 Sgts and several troopers. The individuals assigned to this unit work a Monday – Friday schedule.

To be eligible to participate in the promotional process for any rank a member must have received a rating of "meets or exceeds" in overall performance on his/her two most recent performance evaluations; and must have achieved an overall average in the most recent physical fitness evaluation to the extent contractually required unless excused by a medical certificate.

All members begin their service with the state police as probationary Troopers. After one year of service they reach the rank of Trooper and earn their single stripe. Listed below are the various ranks and the insignia that each rank wears.

Rank	Insignia	
Colonel		The Director of the Vermont State Police may be promoted to full colonel at the discretion of the Commissioner.
Lieutenant colonel		The Director of the Vermont State Police is a lieutenant colonel. The Commissioner of Public Safety makes this appointment for a term of three years. The director may be reappointed at the commissioner's discretion. This rank can also be issued to a deputy director, though actual use of such a position varies and is not always used.
Major		Captains may be promoted to major on a case-by-case basis when the need arises. Currently the State Police has three majors, each overseeing one of the major divisions of the State Police i.e., Support Services, Field Force and Bureau of Criminal Investigation (BCI).
Captain		Lieutenants with 6 months of experience at that rank may be considered for promotion to captain. Each troop area is overseen by a captain. There are also a number of captains in staff positions.
Lieutenant		Sergeants with three years of experience at that level may be considered for promotion to lieutenant. Lieutenants are commissioned officers and the rank generally includes station commanders as well as commanders of other specialized divisions within the State Police. All members hired after January 1, 1998, must possess a bachelor's degree from an accredited college or university to be eligible for a promotion to lieutenant.
Senior Sergeant		Sergeants with 15 years of service are promoted to the rank of Senior Sergeant.
Sergeant		Troopers are eligible for consideration for promotion to sergeant after a minimum of five years with the department. Sergeants in the State Police are the first-line supervisors, typically referred to as patrol commanders. Many of the department's detectives also hold the rank of sergeant. All members hired after January 1, 1998, must possess an associate degree from an accredited college or university to be eligible for a promotion to sergeant.
Corporal		Troopers are promoted to corporal upon completion of fifteen years of service.
Trooper		Probationary troopers are promoted to the rank of trooper first class after one year of service with the department.
Trooper Probationary		Trooper Probationary No rank insignia. This is the entry level rank of all members of the State Police.

== Fallen officers ==
Since the establishment of the Vermont State Police, six officers have died in the line of duty.

Name	Date of death	Age	Tenure	Cause of death
Trooper Kyle David Young	09-17-2015	28	1 year, 9 months	Heat exertion during tryout
Sergeant Michael Walter Johnson	06-15-2003	39	16 years	Run down by vehicle officers were attempting to stop
Sergeant Gary Allen Gaboury	05-12-1992	35	N/A	Drowned during body recovery
Detective Sergeant William J. Chenard	06-14-1987	43	18 years	Heart attack
Sergeant Arthur L. Yeaw	05-13-1983	53	32 years	Accidentally shot self while cleaning gun
Inspector Robert Daniel Rossier	09-09-1935	23	3 months	Motorcycle crash

== Equipment ==
=== Firearms ===
Name	Type	Caliber	Origin	Notes
Smith & Wesson M&P40	Pistol	.40 S&W	United States	390 M&P40 pistols ordered in 2011
SIG Sauer SIGM400	Rifle	5.56×45mm NATO	United States	221 rifles purchased in 2019

== In popular culture ==
- In the 2001 comedy film, Super Troopers, and its 2018 sequel, Super Troopers 2, the protagonists are Vermont state troopers.
- Lieutenant Joe Gunther, the protagonist of Archer Mayor's long-running mystery novel series set largely in Brattleboro, Vermont, eventually takes an assignment with the VSP.
- In 2012, it was discovered that an inmate (or inmates) at a print shop within a Vermont state correctional facility had altered the decals being printed for use on the cruisers operated by the VSP. The original decal featured an image of a cow grazing, and the alteration involved changing one of the spots on the cow to the outline of a pig. "Pig" is a derogatory term for police officers.

== See also ==
- List of law enforcement agencies in Vermont
- State police
- State patrol
- Highway patrol
- Super Troopers
- BeSeatSmart Child Passenger Safety Program
