= L.A. Rumbold =

British aircraft interiors manufacturer

L.A. Rumbold was an important British aircraft interiors manufacturer, now a part of a larger company.

== History ==
The company was formed on 31 July 1933 to make seats for de Havilland aircraft, in north-west London.

The company made seats for military aircraft as well, such as Handley Page. The company was bought by Spurling Motor Bodies on 23 November 1959, which made Spurling Stairways, of Edgware Road, for aircraft.

The company moved again in 1963. Spurling was bought in December 1964, for £2.2m.

The company made aircraft galleys as well, and culinary water boilers.

By the 1970s the company had supplied to over one hundred airlines, including BOAC.

The company was bought in 2012.

=== Awards ===
- Queens Award for Export Achievement in 1991
- Queens Award for Export Achievement in 1992 for the Camberley site

== Structure ==
The company, under new ownership, has a main manufacturing site in Camberley in Surrey.

== Products ==
It made the aircraft seats for Concorde in the 1970s.

== See also ==
- AIM Altitude
