= Isofix =

International standard for attachment points for child safety seats in passenger cars

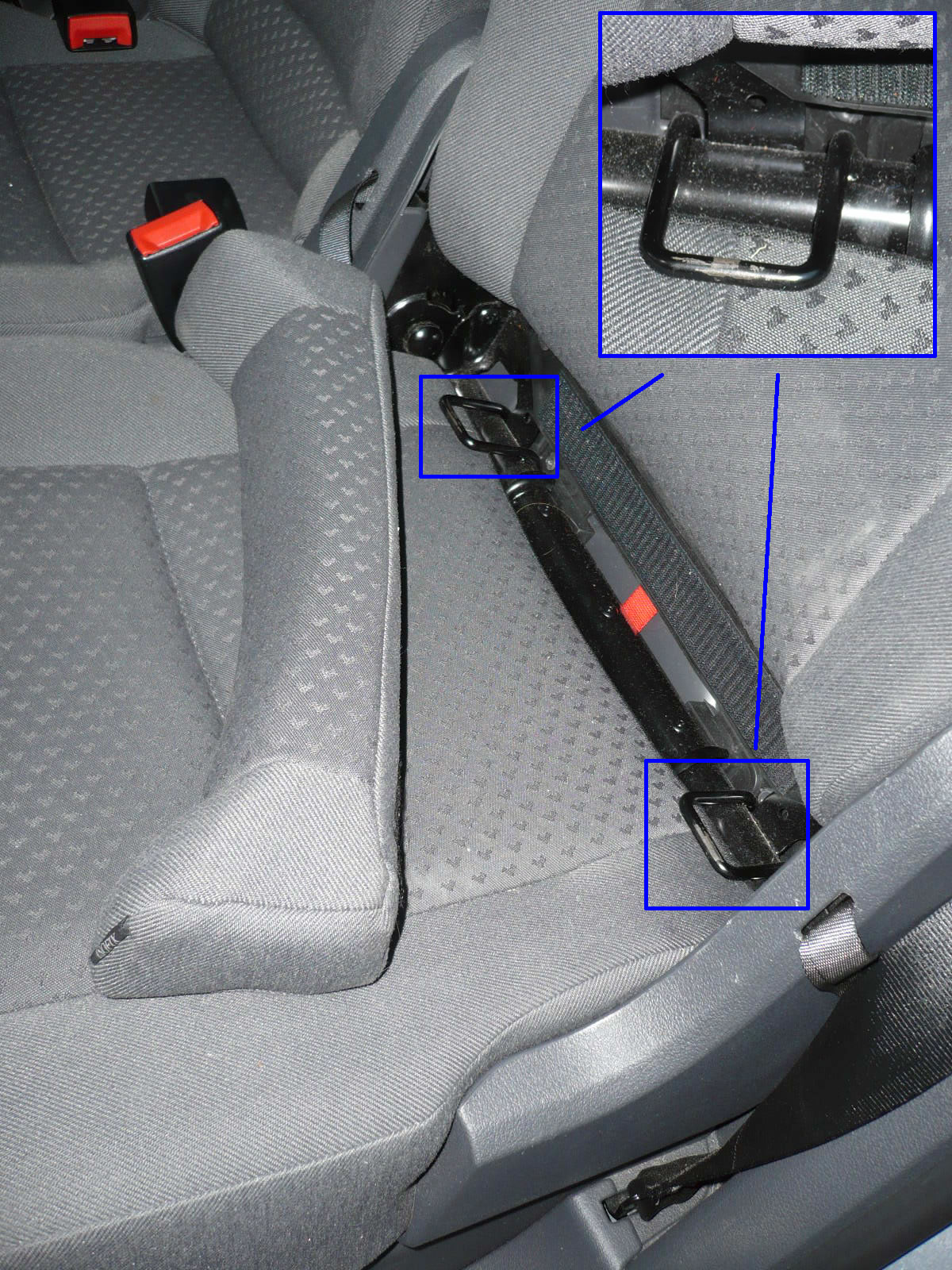
Isofix anchor points under a removable cover

Isofix (styled ISOFIX) is the international standard for attachment points for child safety seats in passenger cars. The system has other regional names including LATCH ("Lower Anchors and Tethers for CHildren") in the United States, and LUAS ("Lower Universal Anchorage System") or Canfix in Canada. It has also been called the "Universal Child Safety Seat System" or UCSSS.

Isofix is International Organization for Standardization (ISO) standard ISO 13216, which specifies the anchoring system for Group 1 child safety seats. It defines standard attachment points to be manufactured into cars, enabling compliant child safety seats to be quickly and safely secured. Isofix is an alternative to securing the seat with seat belts. Seats are secured with a single attachment at the top (top tether) and two attachments at the base of each side of the seat. The full set of anchor points for this system were required in new cars in the United States starting in September 2002.

In the EU the system is known as Isofix and covers both Group 0/0+ and Group 1 child safety seats. The mechanism for attaching the seat to the lower anchors is quite different from that in the United States. In the EU two "alligator-like" clips connect the seat to the lower anchors rather than the open clip style connectors commonly used in the United States. However, some child seat manufacturers are beginning to offer true Isofix type attachments in the United States. In the European standard, there are also various installation categories: "universal", "vehicle-specific" and "semi-universal". The main difference is that "universal" represents use of a top tether strap with the Isofix anchorage, "vehicle-specific" represents the usage of the Isofix anchorage without the top tether in specified vehicles only, while "semi-universal" represents usage of the Isofix anchorage together with a "foot-prop".

Isofix is designed to secure a maximum combined weight (comprising both seat and child) of 33 kilograms (73 lb).

The center-to-center distance between the anchors of Isofix (and also LATCH) systems is 280 mm (11 in).

== History ==
ISO 13216 part 1 (covering lower anchorage points) was published in 1999. Part 2, covering top tether anchorages was published in December 2004.

Amendments to include Isofix in United Nations Economic Commission for Europe (UNECE) vehicle regulations 14 and 44, which specify uniform provisions for the design of vehicle seat anchorages and child safety seats, came into force for signatory countries in February 2004.

Under the current UN/ECE R14, all new vehicles produced since February 2013 are required to have Isofix lower anchorages and top tether attachments.

=== Australia ===
On September 19, 2014, the Australian government legalized the use of Isofix child seats. Prior to this date, their sale (and use) in Australia was illegal.
