= AIM Altitude =

AIM Altitude (Aircraft Interiors Manufacturers) was a main British manufacturer of aircraft cabins, and their components, for airliners.

== History ==
The original company was registered on 24 June 1940. It became known as AIM Aviation in 1990.

W.Henshall & Sons Ltd made components for aircraft interiors. By the 1970s, the company was known as Henshall Group, which also contained Fliteform of Heathrow.

In 1978 the Aircraft Interiors Manufacturers Group was formed from four companies. By the 1980s the group was called AIM Group plc, and contained Jecco Aviation of Dorset. AIM Group was listed on the London Stock Exchange in March 1982, valuing the group at £14.7m

In the 1960s, British European Airways (BEA) carried their equipment. In the 1990s it sponsored the Air League Flying Scholarship competition.

AIM Aviation became AIM Altitude in 2014.

== Structure ==
It is situated to the west of the A318 in Byfleet in Surrey, between the M25 and A318, and close to the River Wey. Byfleet & New Haw railway station is around 300 metres to the north.

=== Divisions ===
- AIM Research & Development was in West Sussex
- Henshall Bonded Assemblies of Cambridge became AIM Composites, and made fire-proof fabrics with Nomex; AIM Composites is now off the A10 on the Denny End Industrial Estate in Denny End in South Cambridgeshire
- Jecco Aviation of Dorset made aircraft seating; Jecco was founded in 1926.

== Products ==
In the 1980s, the company was experienced with fitting interiors for the British Aerospace 146, Boeing 737 and BAC One-Eleven. It also makes interiors for helicopters.

== See also ==
- Aerolux of Lancashire
- B/E Aerospace of the USA
- Bucher Group of Switzerland
- Diehl Stiftung of Germany
- JAMCO of Japan
