= Child safety seat =

Seat designed to protect children during traffic collisions

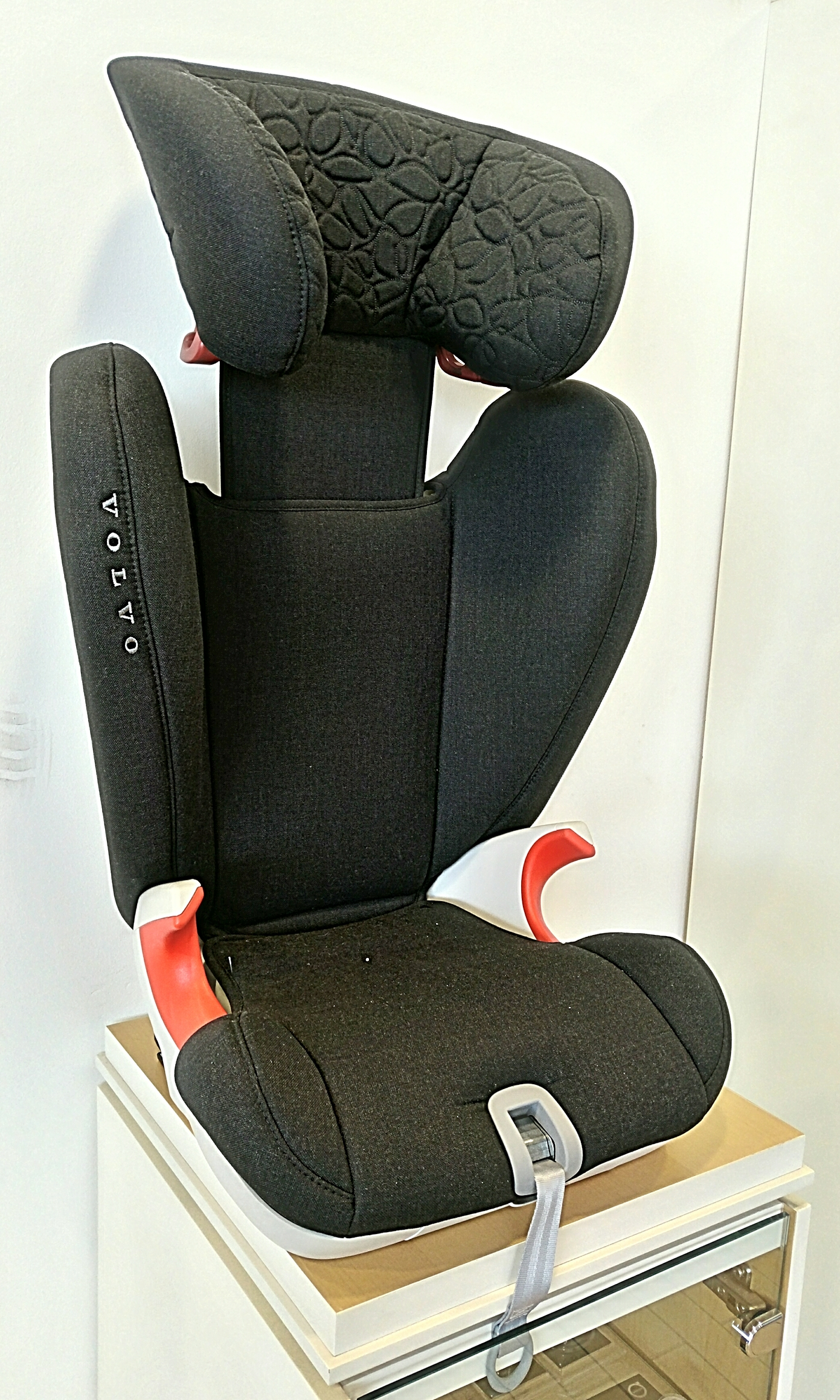
Child safety seat, produced for Volvo

A child safety seat, sometimes called an infant safety seat, infant car seat, child restraint system, child seat, baby seat, car seat, or a booster seat, is a seat designed specifically to protect children from injury or death during vehicle collisions. Most commonly these seats are purchased and installed by car owners, but car manufacturers may integrate them directly into their vehicle's design and generally are required to provide anchors and ensure seat belt compatibility. Many jurisdictions require children defined by age, weight, or height to use a government-approved child safety seat when riding in a vehicle. Child safety seats provide passive restraints and must be properly used to be effective. However, research indicates that many child safety restraints are often not installed or used properly. To tackle this negative trend, health officials and child safety experts produce child safety videos to teach proper car seat installation to parents and caregivers.

== History ==
Since the first car was manufactured and put on the market in the early 1900s, many modifications and adjustments have been implemented to protect those that drive and ride in motorized vehicles. Most restraints were put into place to protect adults without regard for young children. Though child seats were beginning to be manufactured in the early 1930s, their purpose was not the safety of children, but rather to act as booster seats to bring the child to a height easier for the driving parent to see them.

It was not until 1962 that two designs with the purpose of protecting a child were developed independently. In that year, British inventor Jean Ames created a rear-facing child seat with a Y-shaped strap similar to today's models; and American Leonard Rivkin, of Denver, Colorado, designed a forward-facing seat with a metal frame to protect the child.

Seat belts for adults were not standard equipment in automobiles until the 1960s. Child safety seats first became available in the late 1960s, but few parents used them.

==== Baby capsules ====
Slightly different accounts are recorded of the origin of an infant carrier known as a baby safety capsule, invented in Australia and marketed from around 1984. Sydney's Powerhouse Museum reports that it was designed by Robert Pataki and Phillip Slattery at P A Design (later known as Invetech) with Rainsfords Safe-n-Sound designer William (Bill) Bowtell and chief engineer Bob Heath. Other accounts suggest that it was co-created by three men in Adelaide, Australia, Bill Bowtell and Bob Heath of Rainsford Metal Products (now Britax), and Colin Nagel. According to a 1985 study on the safety of the capsule, "The capsule is the culmination of 3 years of research and development by South Australian-based Safe-N-Sound Pty Ltd from a concept first devised 4 years ago by the company's chief design engineer, Bob Heath. The capsule has been patented in 14 countries and is being produced at Safe-N-Sound's NSW plant". Safe-n-Sound was a South Australian company founded in 1969. The development of the capsule was financed by Eric Rainsford, part of the family that founded the firm, and the capsule was marketed by Safe-n-Sound.

Baby safety capsule patented by Safe-n-Sound in Australia in 1984

The capsule, designed specifically for car travel, is rearward-facing and secured to the back seat of the car, and a separate bassinet fits inside the capsule. The outer shell is made of toughened brown plastic. A seat belt extends from the rear of the capsule to secure the capsule in place. There is a cream-coloured plastic bassinet, lined with woollen underblanket, that fits inside the capsule. A belt, fastened by velcro tabs, keeps the baby secure within the bassinet. The velcro body belts were phased out from 1993 to 1996, owing to the introduction of a stricter Australian Standard in 1991, requiring a full body harness to protect babies better in case of a vehicle rollover. It has a release mechanism that enables the bassinet to rotate in the event of a collision, which distributes the forces more uniformly over the body of the infant, and keeps it more upright. There is also an "impact-absorbing bubble" in the base for the bassinet to push against. The bassinet is removable so that it can be removed from the car, and the baby can be carried around in it.

In October 2026, the invention was commemorated when the Royal Australian Mint issued a five-coin set commemorating various inventions, including the baby capsule.

The old design is no longer in use, but Britax and other brands continue to manufacture restraints marketed as "capsules", some of which have handles to lift the whole unit out of the car.

== Regulation ==
In 1990, the ISO standard ISOFIX was launched in an attempt to provide a standard for fixing car seats into different makes of car. The standard now includes a top tether; the U.S. version of this system is called LATCH. Generally, the ISOFIX system can be used with Groups 0, 0+ and 1.

In 2013, a new car seat regulation was introduced: "i-Size" is the name of a new European safety regulation that affects car seats for children under 15 months of age. It came into effect in July 2013 and provides extra protection in several ways, most notably by providing rearward facing travel for children up to 15 months instead of 9 to 12 months, which the previous EU regulation advised.

== Classifications (Europe) ==
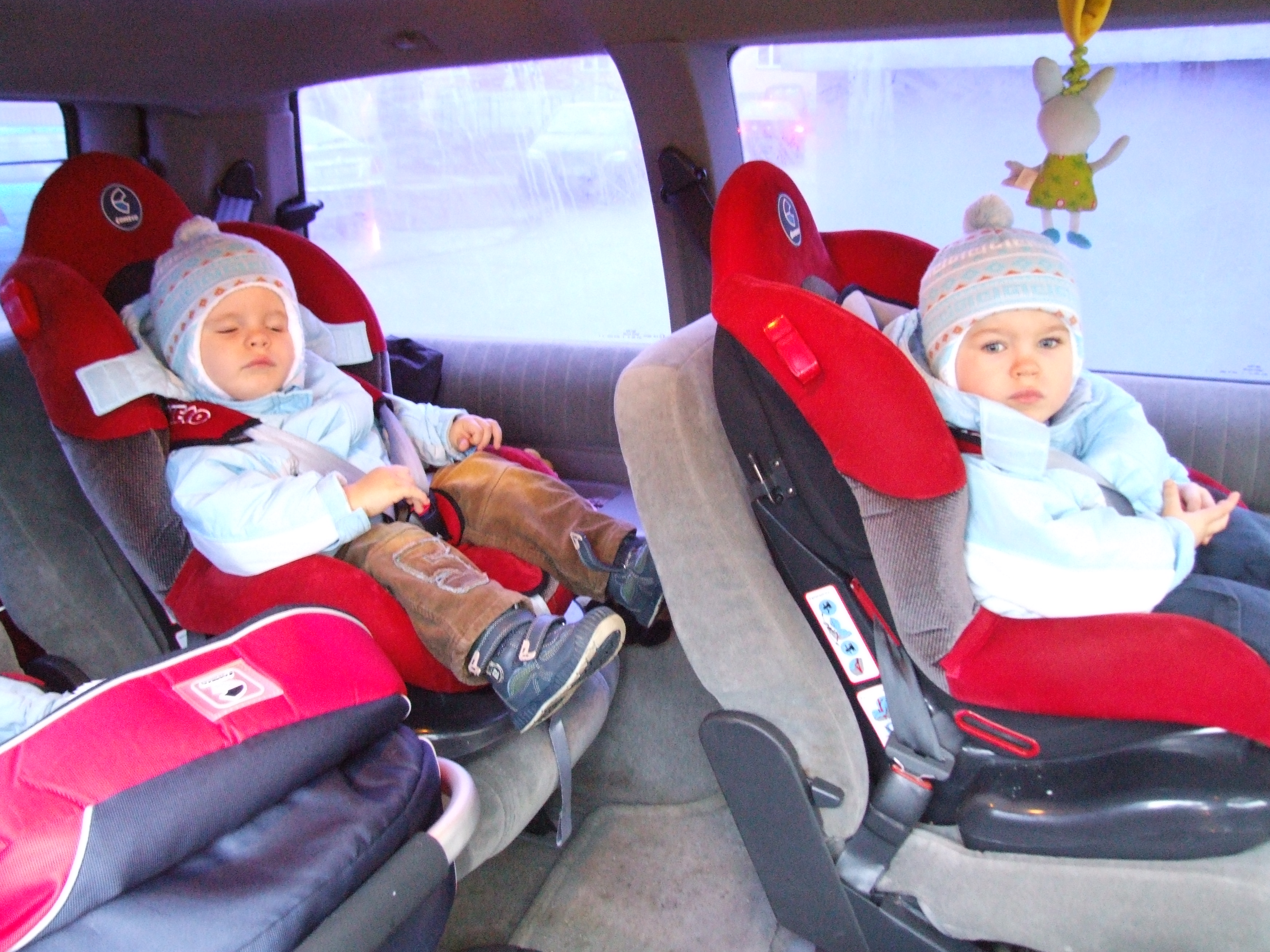
Child safety seats

There are several types of car seats, which vary in the position of the child and size of the seat. The United Nations European Regional standard ECE R44/04 categorizes these into 4 groups: 0–3. Many car seats combine the larger groups 1, 2 and 3. Some new car models include stock restraint seats by default.

=== Group 0 ===
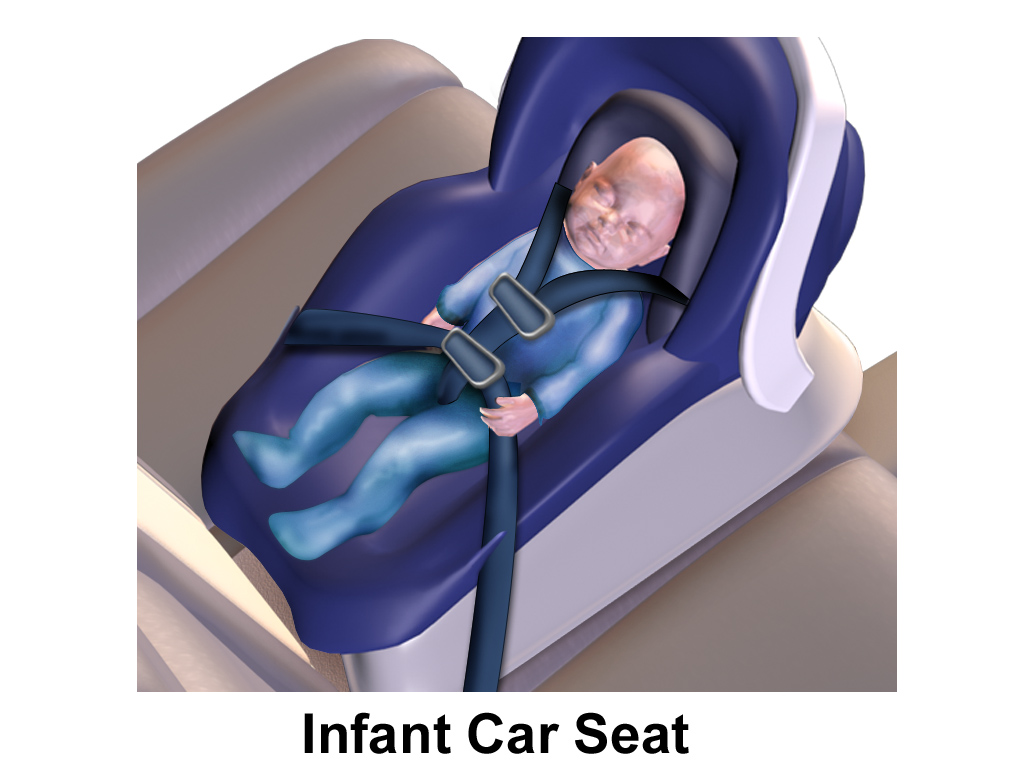
Infant Car Seat

Group 0 baby seats, or infant carriers, keep the baby locked up in a rear-facing position and are secured in place by a standard adult seat belt and/or an ISOFIX fitting. Group 0 carrycots hold the baby lying on its back. Carrycots are secured by both seat belts in the rear seat of the car. Both types have handles to allow them to be easily moved into and out of the car.

- Position: Lying (in carrycots), rear-facing (in infant carriers), no airbags (with the exception of curtain airbags).
- Recommended weight: Birth to 10 kg (22 lb)
- Approximate age: Birth to 15 months
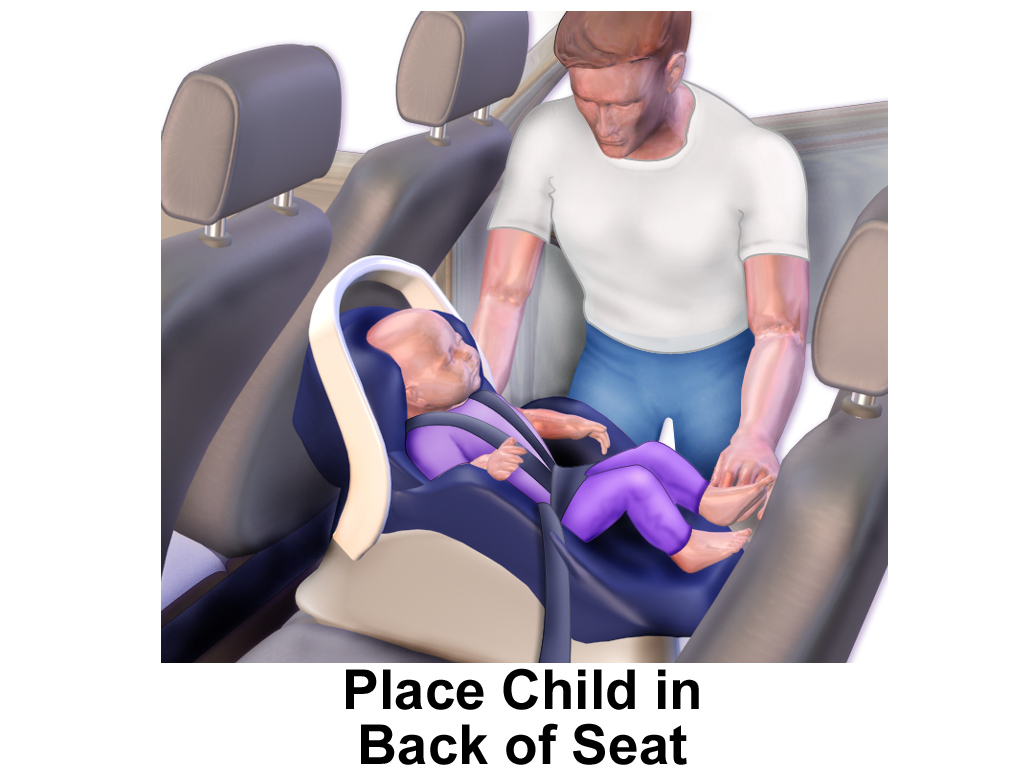
Car Seat - Middle Back Seat

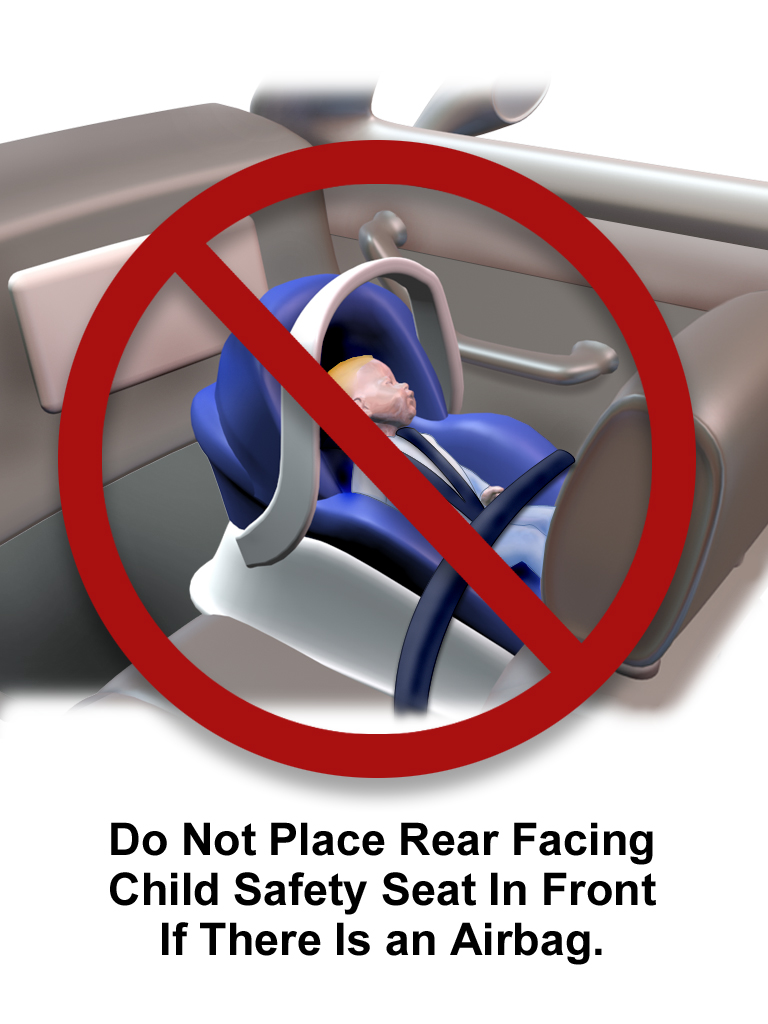
Car Seat - Not in Front Seat

==== Fastened carrycots ====
Carrycots or infant car beds are used for infants that cannot sit in a regular baby seat, such as premature infants or infants that suffer from apnea. A carrycot is a restraint system intended to accommodate and restrain the child in a supine or prone position with the child's spine perpendicular to the median longitudinal plane of the vehicle. Carrycots are designed to distribute the restraining forces over the child's head and body, excluding its limbs, in the event of a big crash. It must be put on the rear seat of the car. Some models can be changed to face forward after the baby has reached the weight limit which is normally about 15–20 kg (33–44 lb).

Carrycots generally include a stomach belt and a connection to the (three points) safety belt.

==== Infant carriers ====
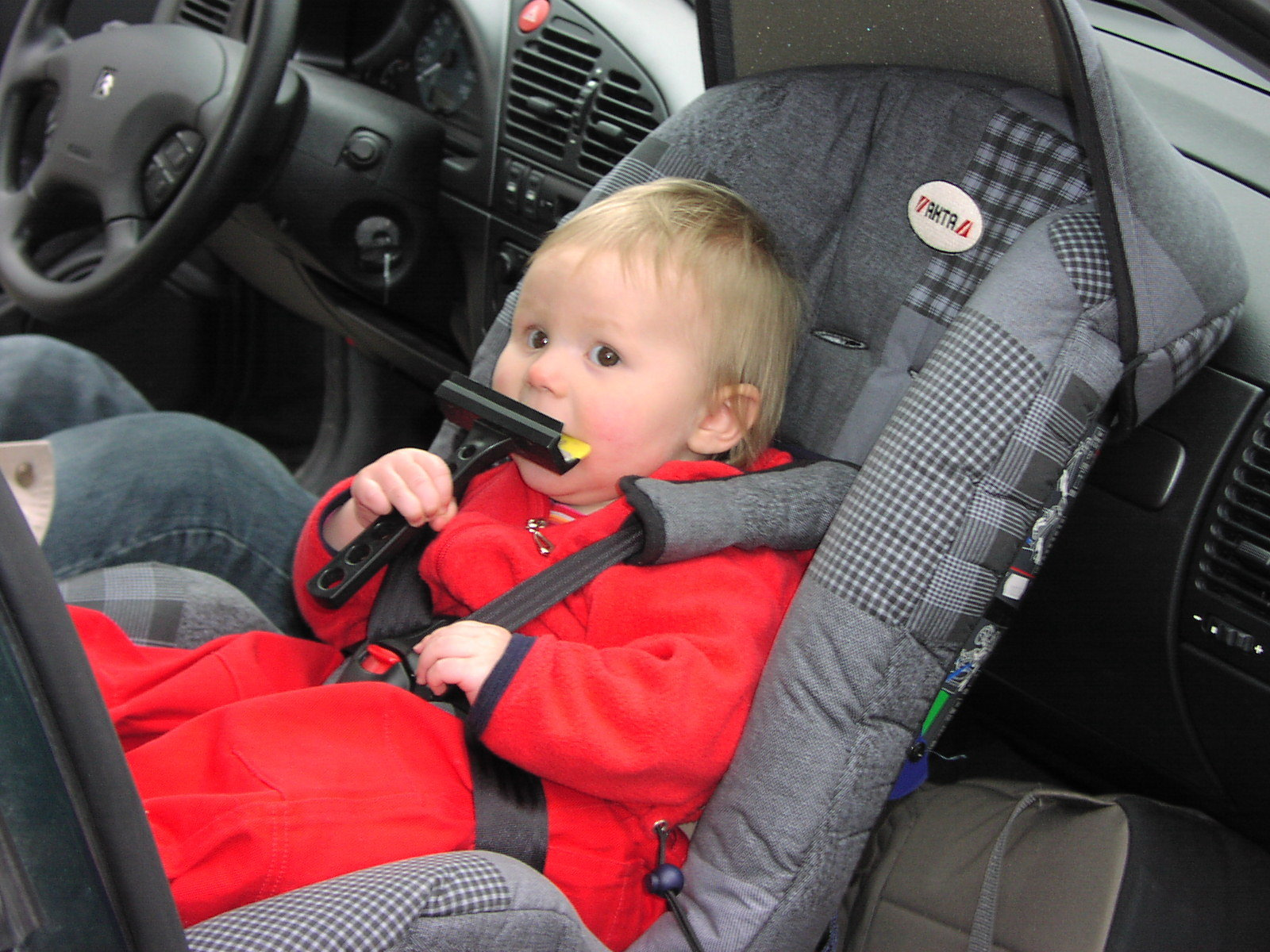
Rear-facing infant car seat

Infant carrier means a restraint system intended to accommodate the child in a rearward-facing semi-recumbent position. This design distributes the restraining forces over the child's head and body, excluding its limbs, in the event of the frontal collision.

For young infants, the seat used is an infant carrier with typical recommended weight range from 4 pounds (1.8 kg) to 35 pounds (16 kg). Most infant seats made in the US can now be used up to at least 30 pounds (14 kg) and 30 inches (76 cm), with some going up to 35 pounds (16 kg). In the past, most infant seats in the US went to 20 pounds (9.1 kg) and 26 inches (66 cm). Infant carriers are often also called "Bucket Seats" as they resemble a bucket with a handle. Some (but not all) seats can be used with the base secured, or with the carrier strapped in alone. Some seats do not have bases. Infant carriers are mounted rear-facing and are designed to "cocoon" against the back of the vehicle seat in the event of a collision, with the impact being absorbed in the outer shell of the restraint. Rear-facing seats are deemed the safest, and in the US, laws vary and children must remain in this position until they are at least 1 year of age in most states and at least 2 years of age in many states. More states are implementing a 2-year minimum. It is always recommended to keep them rear-facing until at least 2 years old or until they outgrow the rear-facing car seat height and weight, whichever is longer.

=== Group 0+ ===
Group 0+ car seats commonly have a chassis permanently fixed into the car by an adult seat belt and can be placed into some form of baby transport using the integral handle if it is the specific model. Rear-facing child seats are inherently safer than forward-facing child seats because they provide more support for the child's head in the event of a sudden deceleration. Although some parents are eager to switch to a forward-facing child seat because it seems more "grown up," various countries and car seat manufacturers recommend that children continue to use a rear-facing child seat for as long as physically possible.

- Position: Sitting, rear-facing, no airbag(with the exception of curtain airbags).
- Recommended weight: Birth (2–3 kg) to 13 kg (29 lb).
- Approximate age: Birth to 15 months

==== Convertible seats ====
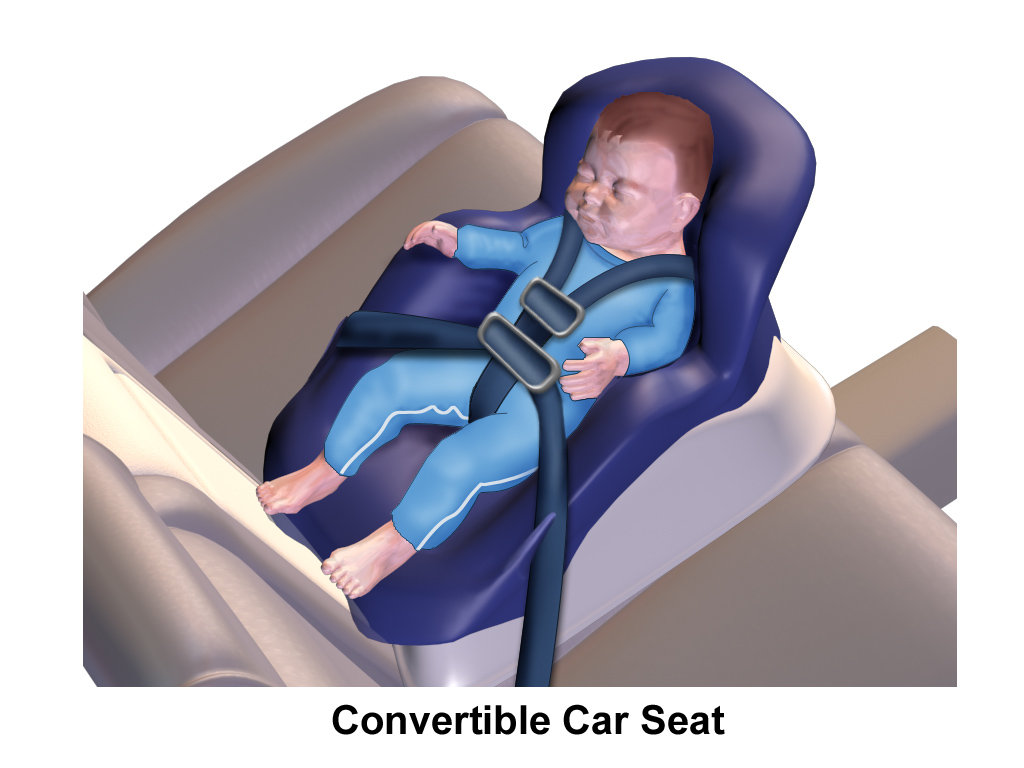
Convertible Car Seat (Toddler)

Convertible seats can be used throughout many stages. Many convertible seats will transition from a rear-facing seat, to a forward-facing seat, and some then can be used as a booster seat. Many convertible seats allow for 2.3–18 kg (5.1–39.7 lb) rear-facing, allowing children to be in the safer rear-facing position up to a weight of 18 kg (40 lb).

Convertible safety seats can be installed as either rear-facing or forward-facing. There is a large selection available to choose from and weight limits, height limits, and extra features vary from seat to seat and by manufacturer. Seats with a 5-point harness are considered safer than those with an overhead shield.

Convertibles are not considered the best choice for a newborn because the bottom harness slots are often above the shoulders of most newborns. A seat with low-bottom harness slots can be used if it is desired to use a convertible from birth.

Rear-facing weight limits range from 9 to 23 kg (20 to 51 lb) depending on the manufacturer and country of origin. Forward-facing limits range from 9 to 40 kg (20 to 88 lb) depending on the seat model and the manufacturer and country of origin.

All convertible seats in the U.S. have at least a 35 pounds (16 kg) rear-facing weight limit, most now to go to 40 pounds (18 kg), and some go to 50 pounds (23 kg). The American Academy of Pediatrics (AAP) recommends that children remain rear-facing until they outgrow their convertible seat, regardless of how old they are. Children can remain in a rear-facing seat until they have either outgrown the weight limit for their seat, or the top of their head is within 25 mm (1 in) of the top of the shell of the car seat.

=== Group 1 ===
A permanent fixture in the car using an adult seat belt to hold it in place and a five-point baby harness to hold the infant.

- Position: Sitting, recommended rear-facing but forward-facing is legal, no airbag (with the exception of curtain airbags).
- Recommended weight: 9 kg to 18 kg (20 lb to 40 lb)
- Approximate age: 9 months to 4 years (Although older children can fit too sometimes)

It is recommended that children sit rear-facing for as long as possible. In Scandinavian countries, for example, children sit rear-facing until around four years old. Rear-facing car seats are significantly safer in frontal collisions, which are the most likely to cause severe injury and death. Rear-facing Group 1 car seats are becoming more widespread but are still difficult to source in many countries.

=== Group 2 ===
A larger seat than the Group 1 design. These seats use an adult seat belt to hold the child in place.

- Position: Sitting, forward-facing or rear-facing (make sure the seat is certified for up to 25 kg (55 lb)
- Recommended weight: 15 kg to 25 kg (33 lb to 55 lb)
- Approximate age: 4 to 6 years (Although older children can sometimes fit)

=== Group 3 ===
Also known as booster seats, these position the child so that the adult seat belt is held in the correct position for safety and comfort.

- Position: Sitting, forward-facing
- Recommended weight: 22 kg to 36 kg (48 lb to 76 lb)
- Approximate age: 4 to 10, and above if the child is not 36 kg (79 lb) yet

==== Booster seats ====
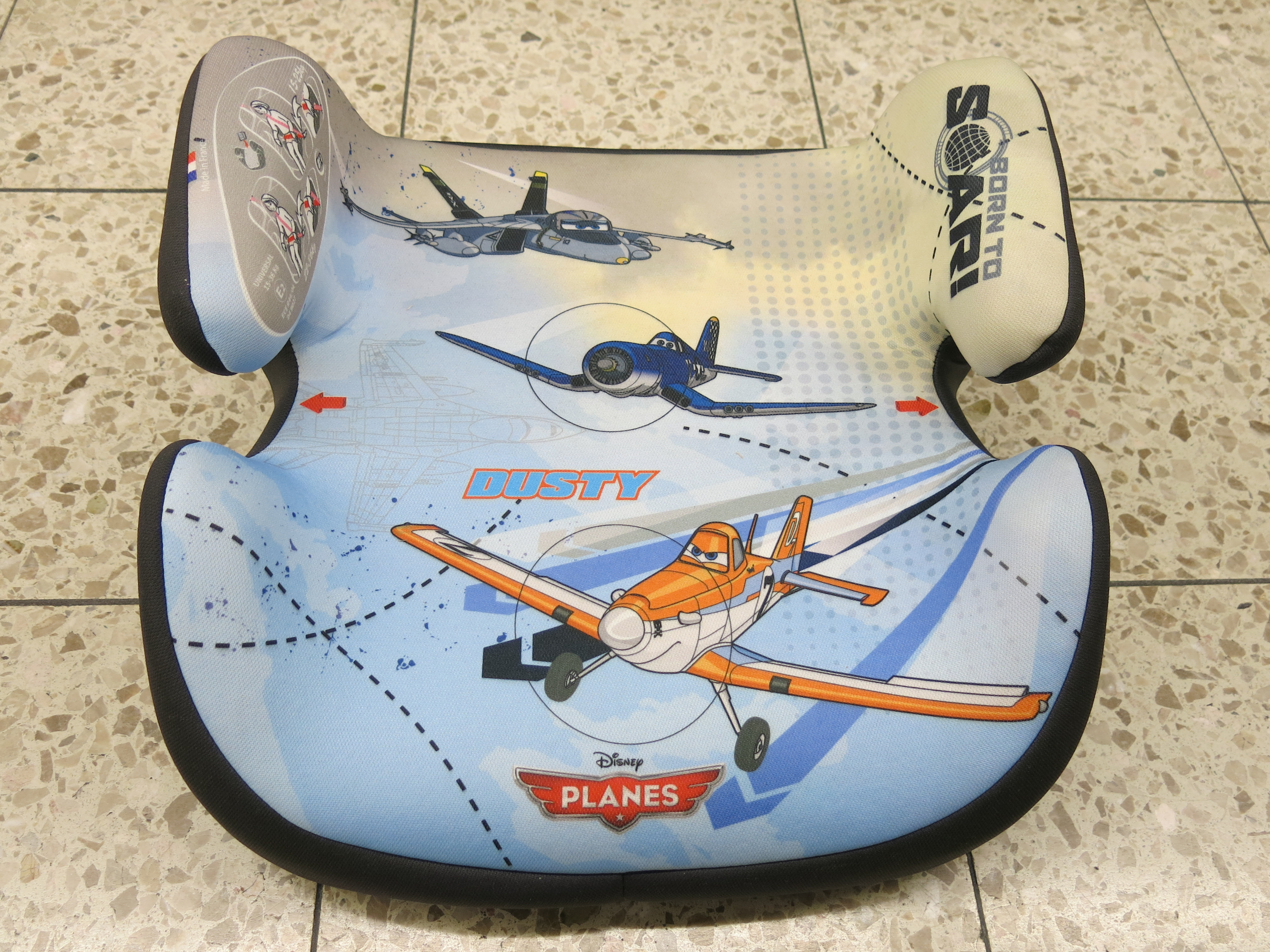
Backless booster seat

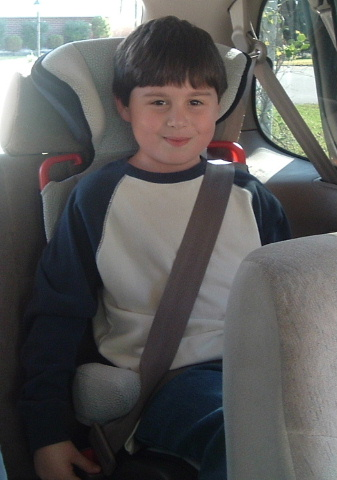
Child in a booster seat

Booster seats are recommended for children until they are big enough to properly use a seat belt. Seat belts are engineered for adults, and are thus too big for small children. In the United States, for children under the age of 4 and/or under 40 pounds (18 kg), a seat with a 5-point harness is suggested instead of a booster seat.

Booster seats lift the child and allow the seat belt to sit firmly across the collar bone and chest, with the lap portion fitted to the hips. If the seat belt is not across the collar bone and the hips, it will ride across the neck and the stomach and cause internal injuries in the event of a collision.

There are two main types of boosters: high back (some of which have energy absorbing foam) and no back. A new generation of booster seats comes with rigid Isofix (Latch) connectors that secure to the vehicle's anchors, improving the seat's stability in the event of a collision. There are also 3-in-1 car seats that can first be used as a rear-facing baby car seat, then as a forward-facing seat, then finally as a booster seat when the child reaches the recommended height and weight. Unlike many booster seats, 3-1 car seats may use the LATCH system to be secured inside the car.

Some consumer groups are calling on manufacturers and retailers to phase out backless boosters, as it says they do not provide enough protection in side-impact crashes and could put children at risk. While backless booster cushions are better than using no child seat at all, they do not provide adequate protection in all circumstances.

==== Front-facing restraints ====
Used for Groups I, II and III.

After reaching one year of age and 20 pounds (9 kg), children may travel in forward-facing seats. Most Scandinavian countries require children to sit rear-facing until at least the age of 4 years. This has contributed to Sweden having the lowest rate of children killed in traffic in international comparisons.

According to Canadian law, and some US states, children must be restrained until they are 4 years old and 40 pounds (18 kg). After the requirement is met, they may use a booster seat instead.

== Types ==
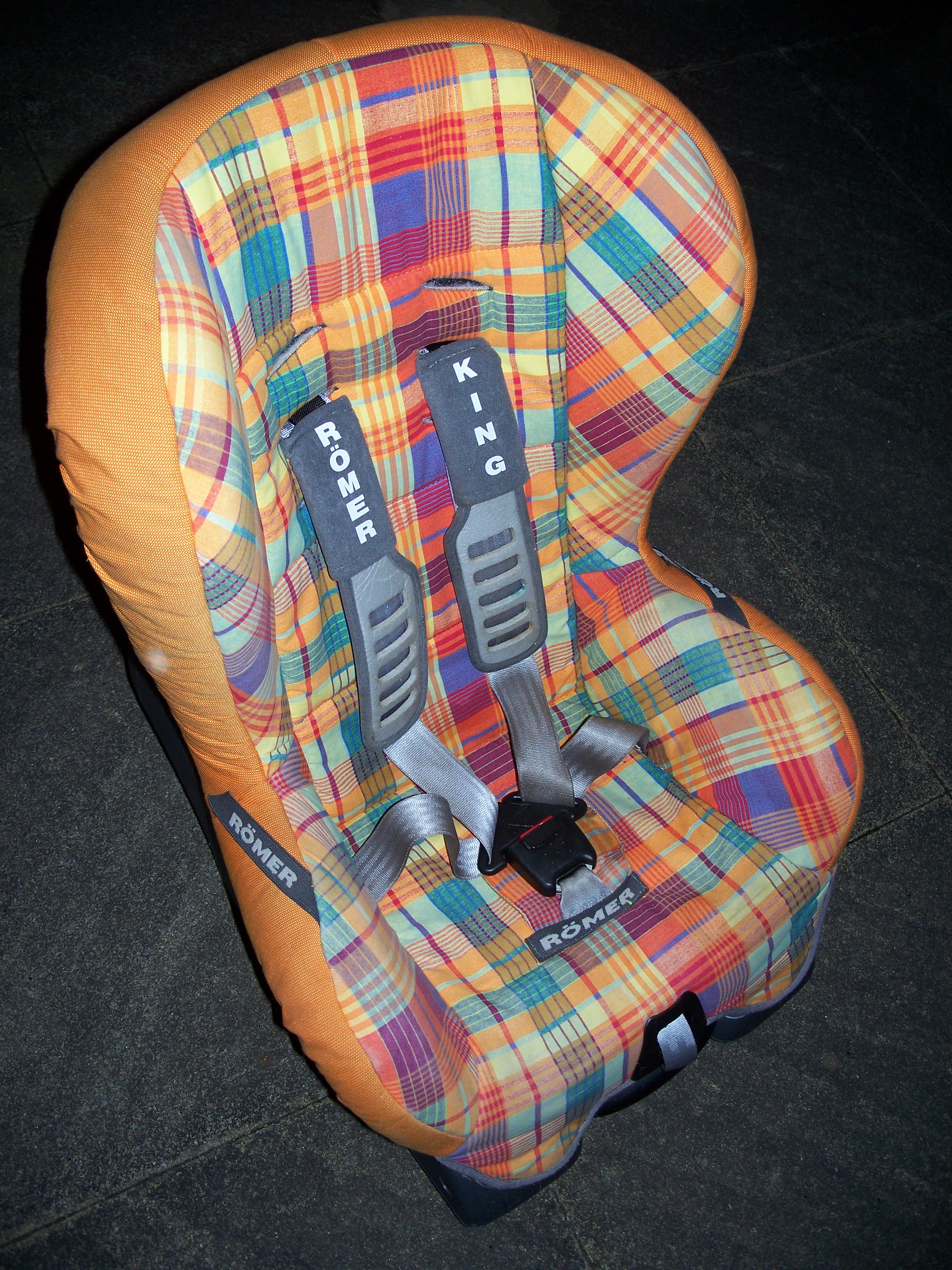
Child safety seat

There are different types of child safety seats for children of different sizes and ages.

- Infant seats: Child safety seats made specifically for infants are the smallest and have carrying handles for easy carrying and loading. Newborns are most often placed in a rear-facing seat. These seats are designed for infants is up to 22 to 32 pounds (10.0 to 14.5 kg), depending on the model.
- Convertible seats: Similar to the infant seat, the convertible seat can be used in a rear- or forward-facing position and is used for children typically beginning at 5 pounds (2.3 kg) up to 50 pounds (23 kg). The rear-facing position is used for children until they weigh more than 20 pounds (9.1 kg) and are at least two years old. Research studies and crash test results show that children are safer in a rear-facing child safety seat. The American Academy of Pediatrics recommends keeping children in a rear-facing seat until "they are 2 years of age or until they reach the highest weight or height allowed by their car safety seat’s manufacturer" (www.healthychildren.org).

Some seats allow the child to stay rear-facing until 45 pounds (20 kg). Once the child has reached the minimum requirements to be forward facing, the seat can be turned around and used as a forward-facing seat.

- Combination seats: The combination seat or five-point booster is a forward-facing seat that has a five-point harness system. It can be modified to a belt-positioning booster by removing some webbing
- Booster seats: The earlier described combination seat can become a high-back belt-positioning booster. There is also a high-back belt positioning-booster that is available for that purpose only. The other type of belt-positioning booster is the low-back or no-back booster. The major differences between the low- and high-back booster seats are head support and improved protection in side-impact collisions. Vehicles with a bench seating and no headrest are required to use a high back booster. The purpose of the booster seats is to provide elevation to the child so the shoulder belt rests appropriately on the shoulder blade and does not ride up the child's neck. It also provides "hips" that the seat belt can rest securely across and remain on the large bones of the child instead of resting across the soft tissue of the abdomen. This seat is available for children over 40 pounds (18 kg) up to over 100 pounds (45 kg). From the ages of eight to twelve, children may have outgrown their booster seats and can be permitted to use regular adult seat restraints. It is suggested that, until the age of thirteen, the child remains in the back seat.

== Safety information ==
Like motorcycle and race car helmets, child restraints are tested for use in just one crash event. This means that if the restraint is compromised in any way (with or without the child in it), owners are strongly suggested to replace it. This is due to the uncertainty with how a compromised child restraint will perform in subsequent crashes.

The National Highway Traffic Safety Administration (NHTSA) provides guidance on the reuse of child restraint systems after a crash. Replacement of child restraints is recommended following a moderate or severe crash in order to ensure a continued high level of protection for child passengers. However, recent studies demonstrate that child restraints can withstand minor crash impacts without any documented degradation in subsequent performance.

A minor crash is defined by the NHTSA as one in which all of the following apply:

- A visual inspection of the child safety seat, including inspection under any easily movable seat padding, does not reveal any cracking over 2 inches that might have been caused by the crash
- The vehicle in which the child safety seat was installed was capable of being driven from the scene of the crash
- The vehicle door nearest the child safety seat was undamaged
- There were no injuries to any of the vehicle occupants
- The air bags (if any) did not deploy

Crashes that meet all of these criteria are much less severe than the dynamic testing requirement for compliance with Federal Motor Vehicle Safety Standard (FMVSS) 213 and are highly unlikely to affect future child safety seat performance.

Child restraints are sometimes the subject of manufacturing recalls. Recalls vary in severity; sometimes the manufacturer will send an additional part for the seat, other times they will provide an entirely new seat.

The purchase of a used seat is not recommended. Due to the aforementioned concerns regarding expiry dates, crash testing, and recalls, it is often impossible to determine the history of the child restraint when it is purchased second-hand.

Children traveling by plane are safer in a child safety seat than in a parent's arms. The FAA and the AAP recommend that all children under 40 lb use a child safety seat on a plane. Booster seats cannot be used on airplanes because they do not have shoulder belts.

Parents should not put children into safety seats with thick winter coats on. The coat will cushion the child in an accident and the straps will not cause damage and keep the child safe. An alternative would be placing a coat on the child backwards after buckling the child in.

Straps on the harness should be snug on the child, parents should not be able to pinch the straps away from the shoulders of the child. The straps also need to be placed at the proper height for the child.

== Seat placement ==
A study of car crash data from 16 U.S. states found that children under the age of 3 were 43% less likely to be injured in a car crash if their car seat was fastened in the center of the back seat rather than on one side. Results were based on data from 4,790 car crashes involving children aged 3 and younger between 1998 and 2006. According to data, the center position was the safest but least used position.

The move from having car seats in the front passenger seat to having them in the back seat, facing backwards, may make it easier for parent or caregiver to forget an infant in the car. Each year, between 30 and 50 infants die of heat illness and hyperthermia in the United States after being left in a car.

== Law ==
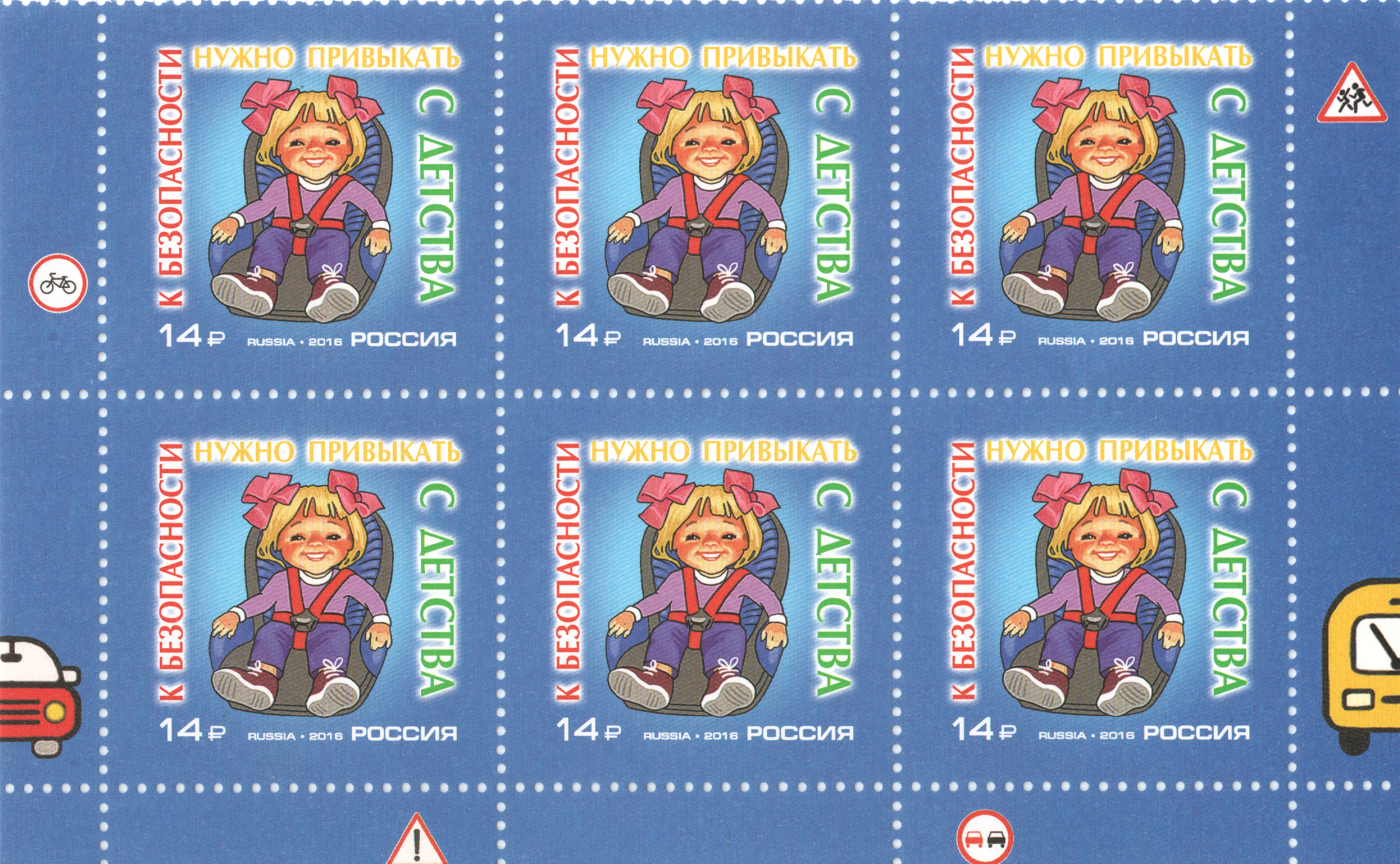
Child safety postage stamp of Russia showing a child safety seat

Baby car seats are legally required in many countries, including most Western developed countries, to safely transport children up to the age of 2 or more years in cars and other vehicles.

Other car seats, also known as "booster seats," are required until the child is large enough to use an adult seat belt. This is usually, but not always, when the child is 135 cm (4.43 ft; 53 in) tall. The child needs to meet five criteria before moving out of the booster seat, including the child's seating position, shoulder belt position, lap belt position, knee position, and ability to sit properly for the length of the trip.

Generally, countries that regulate passenger safety have child safety laws that require a child to be restrained appropriately depending on their age and weight. These regulations and standards are often minimums, and with each graduation to the next kind of safety seat, there is a step down in the amount of protection a child has in a collision. Some countries, such as Australia and the United States, forbid rear-facing child seats in a front seat that has an airbag. A rear-facing infant restraint put in the front seat of a vehicle places an infant's head close to the airbag, which can cause severe head injuries or death if the airbag deploys. Some modern cars include a switch to disable the front passenger airbag for child-supporting seat use.

=== European Union and UNECE regulations ===
Directive 2003/20/EC of the European Parliament and the Council has mandated the use of child-restraint systems in vehicles effective May 5, 2006. Children less than 135 centimetres (53 in) tall in vehicles must be restrained by an approved child restraint system suitable for the child's size. In practice, child restraint systems must be able to be fitted to the front, or other rows of seats.

For a child restraint to be sold or used within any of the 56 UNECE member states it must be approved by the standards of UNECE Regulation 44/04, Directive 77/541/EEC or any other subsequent adaptation thereto. In order to be granted ECE R44 approval the child restraint must comply with several design, construction and production conformity standards. If approval is granted the seat can display an orange label with the unique approval license number, the type of approval, the mass group approved for and the details of the manufacturer.

However, until May 9, 2008, member states may have permitted the use of child restraint systems approved in accordance with their national standards. Euro NCAP has developed a child-safety-protection rating to encourage improved designs. Points are awarded for universal child-restraint anchorages ISOFIX, the quality of warning labels and deactivation systems for front-passenger airbags.

2013: New EU I-Size regulation is introduced: "i-Size" is the name of a new European safety regulation, UNECE Regulation 129 that affects car seats for children under 15 months of age. It came into effect in July 2013 and provides extra protection in several ways, most notably by providing rearward facing travel for children up to 15 months instead of 9 to 12 months, which the previous EU regulation advised. This new regulation is to be phased in between 2013 and 2018 and will be run in parallel to UNECE R44/04 until 2018 when it completely supersedes it.

=== Australia ===
AS1754

Australian laws regarding infants in motor vehicles were revised on November 9, 2009.

By law every child restraint sold in Australia must carry the Australian Standard AS/NZ1754 sticker (pictured right). Most overseas child restraints, including restraints from Europe and the US, do not comply with these Standards and cannot legally be used in Australia. This also applies for ISOFIX child restraints imported from Europe or the USA.

- Children under seven must be restrained in a suitable, approved child restraint or booster seat.
- Children under six months must be restrained in a rear-facing position.
- Children between six months and under four years must be restrained in a rear- or forward-facing restraint.
- Children between four and under seven must be restrained in a forward-facing restraint or booster seat.

In Australia there are six different types (Type A to Type F) of child restraints under the mandatory standard. Note: these restraints are NOT based on weight but on HEIGHT. All car seats with the AS/NZ1754 sticker will have height markers. These markers show clearly for what height the seat is appropriate.

The six types are:

1. Type A: Rearward-facing or transversely installed restraint with a harness or other means of holding the child back
2. Type B: Forward-facing chair with a harness
3. Type C: Forward-facing harness without a chair
4. Type D: Rearward-facing chair with harness
5. Type E: a restraint that consists of either:
  - a booster seat or booster cushion used with a Type C child restraint and a seat belt, or with a lap-sash seat belt,
  - a converter seat suitable for children who weigh 18 to 32 kg (40 to 71 lb).
6. Type F: A restraint that consists of either:
  - a booster seat used in conjunction with a Type C child restraint and a seatbelt, or with a lap-sash seatbelt, suitable for children approximately 4 to 10 years of age, or
  - a converter used in conjunction with a seatbelt, suitable for children approximately 8 to 10 years of age.

Combination Type A/B: Child restraints can also be a combination of the above types. For example, a Type A/B converter seat.

The responsibility for children under the age of 16 using restraints or safety belts correctly rests with the driver. In Queensland, penalties for drivers not ensuring that passengers under the age of 16 are properly restrained involve a fine of A$300 and three demerit points. In Victoria the penalty is a fine of A$234 and three demerit points. Possible suspension or cancellation of license may also apply.

==== Exemptions to the law ====
- Laws regarding taxis vary by state for infants. For children up to seven, a child restraint must be used if available, otherwise the child must use a properly fastened and adjusted seat belt.
- A child traveling in a police or emergency vehicle.
- If a child has a medical condition or physical disability that makes it impractical to use a child restraint and the driver has a certificate from a doctor indicating this is the case.

=== Austria ===
As an EU member states, products used in Austria should comply with European Union single market definitions.

- All children who are smaller than 150 cm (4 ft 11 in) and younger than 14 years old must use a booster or car seat appropriate to their weight. A child must be either 14 years old or 4'11" to ride without a booster seat.

=== Brazil ===
- All children who are smaller than 145 cm (4 ft 9 in) and younger than 7 years old must use a booster or car seat appropriate to their weight. A child must use a car seat at ages 0–4; Ages 5–7 a booster is required.
- Children under 10 years old are required to ride in the back seat.

=== Canada ===
- Child restraint requirements vary from province to province.
- The strictest province law requires children who are younger than 8 years and smaller than 4 ft 9 in to use a booster seat.
- For safety reasons, it is generally advised to use a booster seat until the child reaches a height of 4 ft 9 in.

=== Germany ===
As an EU member states, products used in Germany should comply with European Union single market definitions.

- All children younger than 12 years and smaller than 150 cm (4 ft 11 in) must use a booster seat or child-safety seat appropriate to their weight. The Department of Transport advises that children continue to use a seat when they are 12 years or older but smaller than 150 cm (4 ft 11 in).
- It is highly recommended that children younger than 14 years sit in the back seat or use a booster seat in the front seat.

=== Israel ===
- 1961 Israeli transportation law states that every passenger and driver in the vehicle must either have a seat belt or a safety seat. A child under the age of 3 must be set in an approved safety seat, and until the age of 8 the child needs to be in a booster or a safety seat. Up until one year a child must ride rear-facing. Children with the appropriate car seat are allowed to travel in the front seat if the airbag is disabled. The Israeli transportation regulation states that a child under the weight of 36 kg (79 lb), height of 140 centimetres (4 feet 7 inches), or age of 8 will use some kind of safety chair.

The Israeli regulation states that a Sal Kal (he:סל קל lit. light basket) is equal to European group 0 and group 0+ regulations

An Urban legend in Israel states that nursery homes and hospitals will not allow exit with an infant if a SalKal (infant carry one safety seat) is not presented.

=== New Zealand ===
NZ Transport Agency governs the rules and sets standards for the health and safety aspects with respect to child restraints in New Zealand. Their guidelines dictate the minimum legal requirements for a New Zealand vehicle from the safety perspective. The correct fitting of a car seat can protect individuals and can be a lifesaver. This page provides details on qualified seat installation processes and approved standardized marks to look out for in child restraints. The Agency trains and certifies NZTA certified child restraint technicians who are authorized to install child safety seats.

==== Rules and regulations for passengers of different ages ====
- Children aged under 7 years must use an approved child restraint unless they are travelling in a public bus, shuttle or taxi and an approved child restraint is not available.
- Children aged 7 years must use an approved child restraint if one is available.
- Children aged 8 years to 14 years are not required to use a child restraint. However, if a seat belt is not available (pre-1979 vehicles are not required to be fitted with seat belts on all seats), they must sit in the back seat.

==== New Zealand Approved Marks for child restraints ====
All child restraints must meet the standards set by the NZ Transport Agency. There are different marks to indicate this approval from the safety perspective. Approved marks/symbols are shown in the table below:

Symbol Description	Standard followed
Tick Mark	Australia and New Zealand standard—AS/NZ 1754
'E' mark and a number	European Standard—ECE 44
'S' mark	United States Standard—FMVSS 213

The number after 'E' in the ECE 44 standard indicates as to which country certifies the child restraint. Hence the number differs between countries. The EU (European Union) also has similar symbols to indicate safety standards for children travelling in a vehicle.

=== Philippines ===
Under the Republic Act No. 11229, or the Child Safety in Motor Vehicles Act which took effect on 2 February 2021, children age 12 years and below who are smaller than 1.50 m (4 ft 11 in) are required to use "child restraint systems" or child car seats and is bared from seating in the front seat of vehicles. The Department of Transportation is also mandated by the same law to conduct a feasibility study on the use of child restraint systems on public transport including buses, taxis, and jeepneys. The law does not cover motorcycles and motorized tricycles.

=== Spain ===
As an EU member states, products used in Spain should comply with European Union single market definitions.

- Front seats: children younger than 12 years or smaller than 4 feet 5 inches must use a child-safety seat. Persons bigger than 135 cm (4 ft 5 in) may use the adult safety belt.
- Rear seats: persons smaller than 135 centimetres (4 feet 5 inches) must use a child-safety seat. Also true for kids younger than 12 years.

=== United Kingdom ===
As it was an EU member state at the time laws were introduced, products used in United Kingdom should comply with European Union single market definitions.

From September 18, 2006, all children under the age of 12 have to use some form of child car seat, unless they are taller than 135 centimetres (4 feet 5 inches).

=== United States ===
- In 2003, the American Academy of Pediatrics (AAP) suggested that infants "should spend minimal time in car seats (when not a passenger in a vehicle) or other seating that maintains supine positioning" to avoid developing positional plagiocephaly ("flat head syndrome").
- Child restraint requirements differ for the various states in the United States.
- In Florida and South Dakota, children who are four years or older can use an adult seat belt without a child safety seat. In the rest of the country, a booster seat or otherwise appropriate child restraint is required until the child is between five and nine years old, depending on the state.
- Most states include in their law a requirement that all infants ride rear-facing until they are BOTH one year of age AND at least 20 pounds. Though it is not included in every state's law, no child safety restraint marketed to the US will accommodate an infant less than 20 pounds, some no less than 22 pounds, in a forward-facing position. As of 2011, most children ride rear-facing until they are at least 2 years of age.
- The National Highway Traffic Safety Administration (NHTSA) advises the use of a child restraint or a booster seat for all children who are shorter than 4 ft 9 in, regardless of age and weight, or even longer if the belts hit the child at the wrong place. Some booster seats can be used for children up to 60 inches and 120 pounds.
- Many state laws prefer that children 12 years and younger sit in the back seat if available. Some states, as is the case in Michigan, forbid placing a child under the age of 4 years in a front seat if a rear seat is available.
- Some states require that all child safety seats be used in full accordance with the manufacturer's instructions in what is sometimes referred to as a "proper use clause".

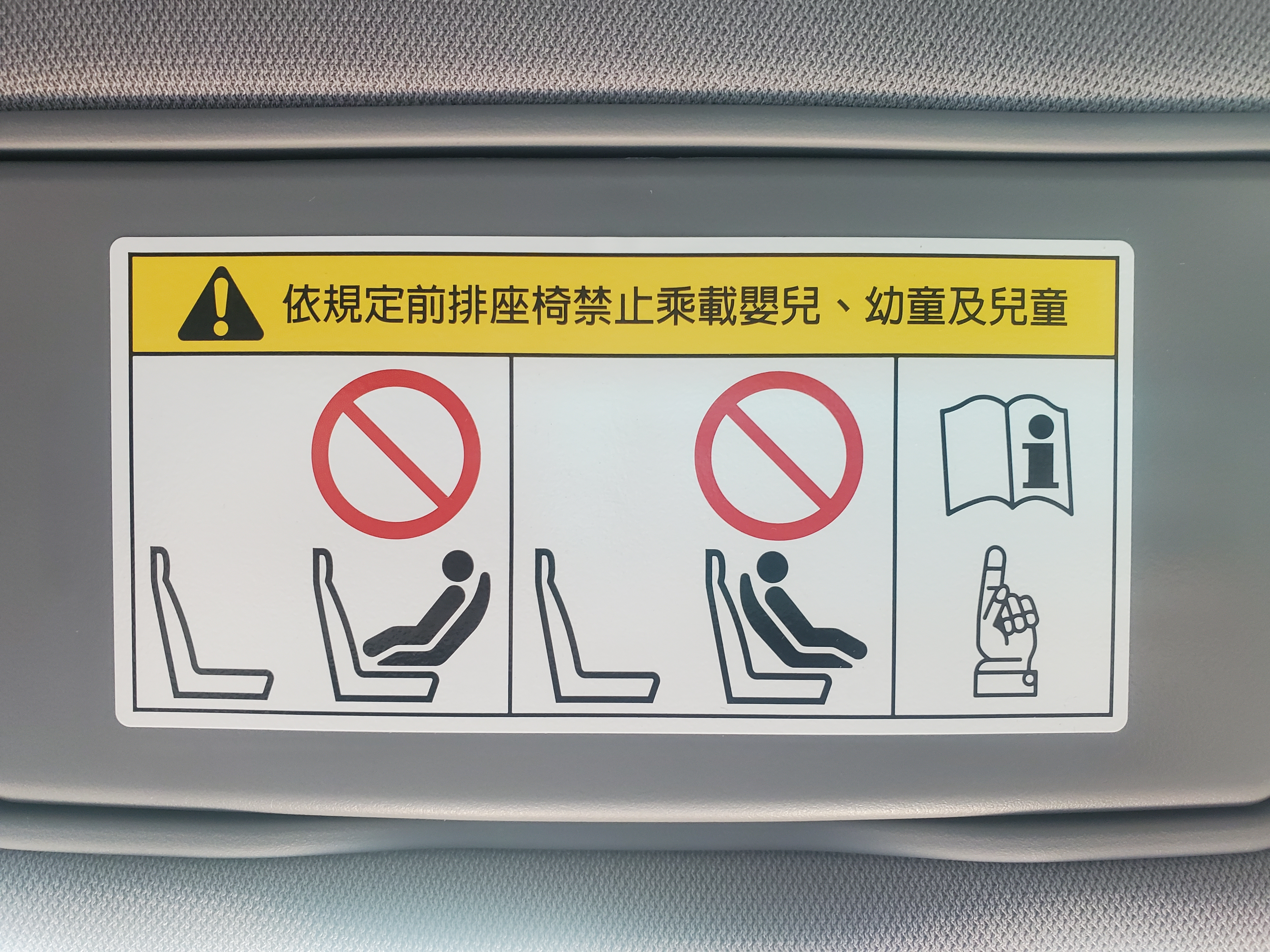
Child Safety Seat Warning Label for Front Passenger Seat (Taiwan)

== Manufacturing ==
Though there are hundreds of variations of makes and models in the world of child safety seats, the materials used in the manufacturing process are basically the same. Factories in which the seats are put together receive loads of polypropylene pellets. Foam makes up the padding of the individual seats, while vinyl and fabrics are used to make up the covers for the seats as well as the harnesses.

A safety seat increases the safety of a properly restrained child in the case of a motor vehicle accident. The safety seat includes foam padding, fabric covers, a harness, and buckles or attaching mechanisms. Labels and instructions are also attached. Every child safety seat will have an expiration date on it. The Safe Kids USA organization does not recommend using a child safety seat that is more than 6 years old. Periodically, child safety seats are recalled by manufacturers for safety reasons. The National Highway Traffic Safety Administration posts a link to recent recall information at its website.

== Hazards ==
Manufacturers have quality controls to ensure seats are properly put together and packaged. However, it is not guaranteed that the included instructions are always adhered to and correctly followed. Up to 95% of the safety seats that are installed may not be the right seat for the child, may be hooked into the vehicle loosely, may be hooked with an incompatible belt in the vehicle, may have harnesses incorrectly fastened in some way, or may be incorrectly placed in front of air bags. In 1997, six out of ten children who were killed in vehicle crashes were not correctly restrained.

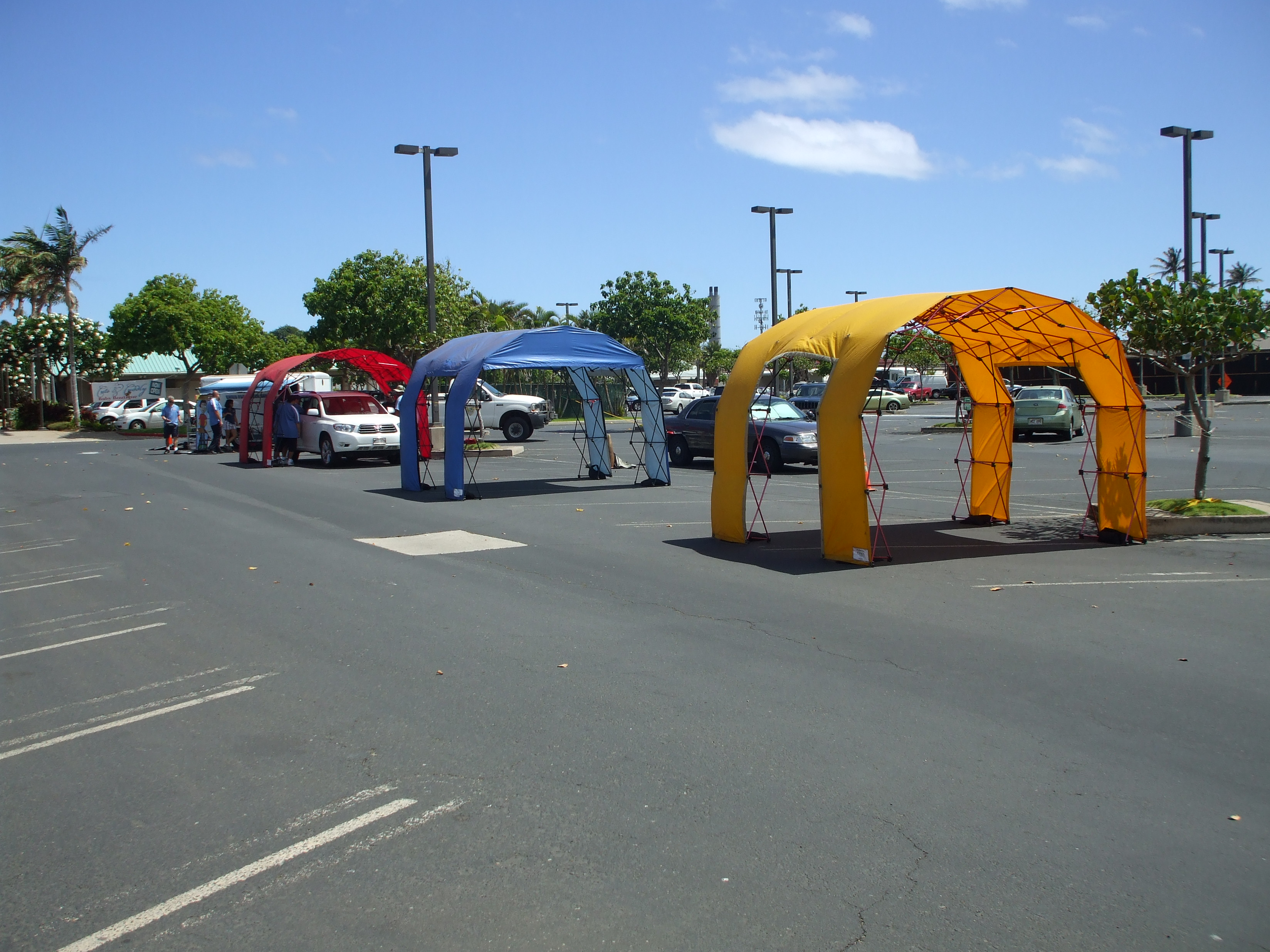
Child Safety Seat Inspection site by the Maui Police Department

Along with the problem of instructions not being followed properly, there are other hazards that can affect children involving these safety seats. A recent study attributed many cases of sudden infant death syndrome (SIDS) to the prolonged sitting or lying position these infants are in when putting the safety seats to use. When researchers reviewed more than 500 infant deaths, it was found that 17 of these deaths occurred while the infant was in a device such as a child safety seat. The age of the most occurring rates of death by SIDS in a child safety device was found to be under one month, having six of the 17 deaths happen in this age group. Although SIDS has been found to be a high risk regarding child safety seats, a coroner in Quebec also stated that "putting infants in car seats…causes breathing problems and should be discouraged." His warning came after the death of a two-month-old boy who was left to nap in a child safety seat positioned inside his crib rather than the crib itself. The death was linked to positional asphyxiation. This means that the child was in a position causing him to slowly lose his supply of oxygen. Coroner Jacques Robinson said it is common for a baby's head to slump forward while in a car seat that is not properly installed in a car and that can diminish a baby's ability to take in oxygen. "The car seat is for the car," he said. "It's not for a bed or sleeping." Robinson added, however, he has nothing against car seats when they are properly used. The coroner said that it is common for a baby's head to "slump forward while in a car seat and that it diminishes oxygen".

The American Academy of Pediatrics says to "make sure the seat is at the correct angle so your infant’s head does not flop forward. Many seats have angle indicators or adjusters that can help prevent this. If your seat does not have an angle adjuster, tilt the car safety seat back by putting a rolled towel or other firm padding (such as a pool noodle) under the base near the point where the back and bottom of the vehicle seat meet." Safety seats come with an instruction booklet with additional information on the appropriate angle for the seat.

== Criticism ==
Child safety seats offer a considerable safety advantage over seat belts alone, when looking at data about collisions in newer cars with newer child safety seats, without restricting the data to include only fatalities.

Child safety seats can be expensive and bulky, and if the family has multiple children who need to use child safety seats at the same time, it may even be necessary to buy a larger vehicle or specialized, narrower safety seats to comply with legal requirements about transporting children safely. One economic study found that these requirements affected families' decisions about birth spacing, and estimated that, in 2017, the requirements for fitting multiple child safety seats into a vehicle at the same time had likely discouraged several thousand families from having an additional child at that time. A major challenge to child restraint use is that it is considered as a mechanism to discipline children instead of being seen as a safety device by parents and as children became older they actively seek opportunities to negotiate the non-usage of restraints.

== See also ==
- BeSeatSmart Child Passenger Safety Program
- Bike child seat
- Child Passenger Safety Week
- National Child Passenger Safety Board
- Seat belt
