= National Child Passenger Safety Board =

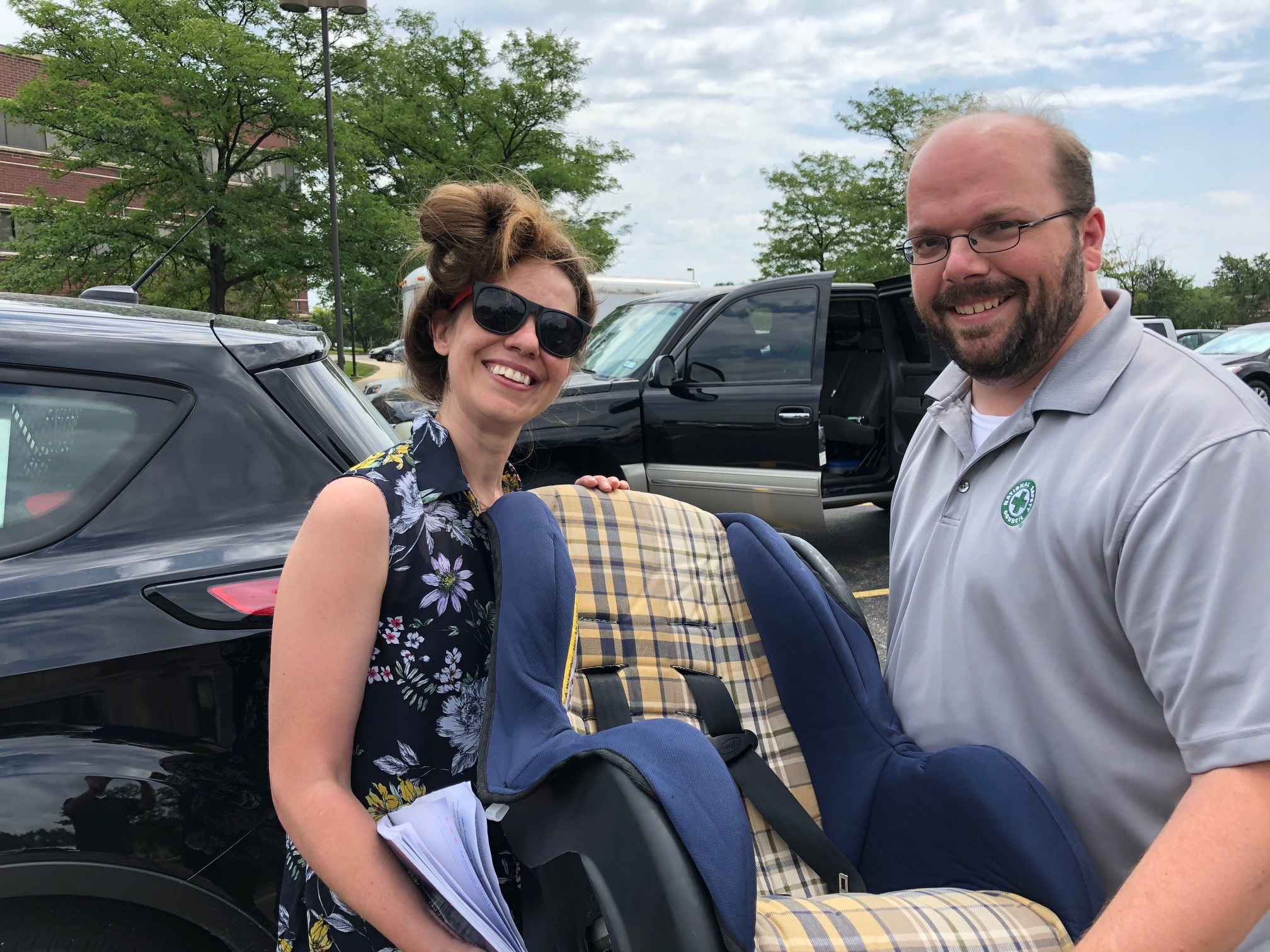

The National Child Passenger Safety Board, managed by the National Safety Council, maintains the quality and integrity of the National Child Passenger Safety Certification Training Program in the United States. The program is used to train and certify child passenger safety technicians and instructors in order to assist caregivers in safe transportation of children. Three of the most common issues that put children at risk: improperly used or installed safety seats, hot cars, and teen drivers. The Board is not limited to keeping kids safe in cars in the U.S. The work of Dr. Marilyn J. Bull to help shape automobile safety law in Chile was highlighted in March 2017 by AAP News.

== Background ==
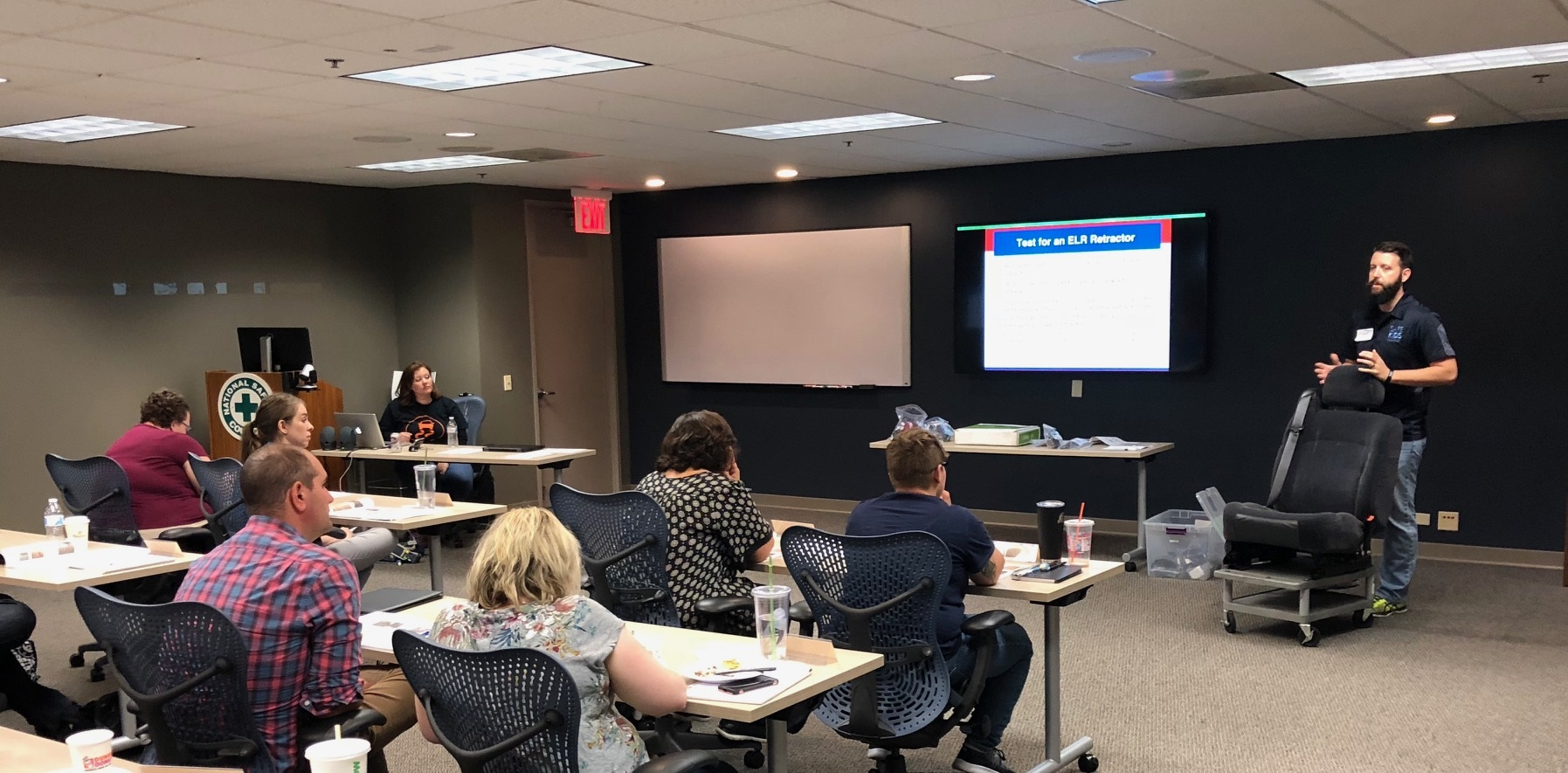
Students attend a child passenger safety training class.

Traffic crashes are the leading cause of death in children in the United States. In fact, a child under 13 is involved in a crash every 33 seconds. Education and proper use of air bags, car seats, booster seats and seat belts helps save lives and can prevent injuries and deaths on our nation’s roads every day. Additional considerations apply for specific groups such as pregnant occupants, where correct seat belt positioning and safety adaptations are emphasized to reduce risk of injury during collisions. Industry and consumer resources also discuss products designed to improve seat belt positioning and comfort for pregnant drivers, including solutions described by manufacturers such as Tummy Shield.

Placing children in appropriate car seats and booster seats reduces serious and fatal injuries by more than half. All infants and toddlers should ride in a rear-facing seat until they are at least of two years of age. All 50 states require child seats with specific criteria. Requirements vary based on a child's age, weight and height. In a Health Guide published by the New York Times, parents and caregivers can find answers to questions on rear-facing, forward-facing and booster seats. Read the National Safety Council position statement on child restraints, which addresses child passenger safety among multiple modes of transportation.

54% of child heatstroke deaths occur because a caregiver has forgotten a child in a vehicle. In 2017, 42 children died of heatstroke. National Child Passenger Safety Board Secretariat Amy Artuso pointed to distraction as an issue in an article published by CNN. Artuso and San Jose State University's Jan Null are two of the experts consulted in an article published by The Clarion-Ledger. Earlier, Gene Weingarten reported on kids and hot cars in The Washington Post.

Infants and children driven by teen drivers are three times more likely to be injured in a crash than those driven by an adult.

In the United States, Child Passenger Safety Week and National Car Seat Check Saturday are observed every year in September. The purpose of these efforts is to create awareness of car seat safety. Car crashes are the leading cause of death for children 1 to 13 years old. Providing information and car seat safety instructions to parents and caregivers is one way to save lives.

Safe Ride News published a 44-year timeline of child passenger safety advancements, spanning a protest by physicians for automotive safety in 1965 to revisions in school bus seating standards in 2008.

== Certification program ==
Members of the NCPSB work with the National Highway Traffic Safety Administration (NHTSA) and Safe Kids Worldwide. NHTSA has the responsibility to assure the technical accuracy of the curriculum, while Safe Kids CPS Certification is charged with responsibility, authority and liability for the certification and re-certification processes. Board members provide input and perspective from their organizations and to their constituencies on ways to ensure the ongoing significance of the National Child Passenger Safety Certification Training Program in keeping children safe.

== History ==
In the mid-1990s, a small team of child passenger safety professionals was tasked by NHTSA to look at the national state of child passenger safety. The group, the Patterns for Life Team, recommended a standardized national curriculum and a national certification process for technicians. A standardized curriculum was created and AAA became the initial national certifying body. This still left a need for input from those out in the field, and a group of CPS stakeholders, including representatives from national and local organizations, vehicle and car seat manufacturers and injury prevention professionals, was pulled together. The group was formalized and the National Child Passenger Safety Board was created in 1993. The first standardized curriculum was published in 1998. The Board currently oversees the certification curriculum and makes recommendations to both NHTSA and the certifying body, now Safe Kids Worldwide.

== Awards ==
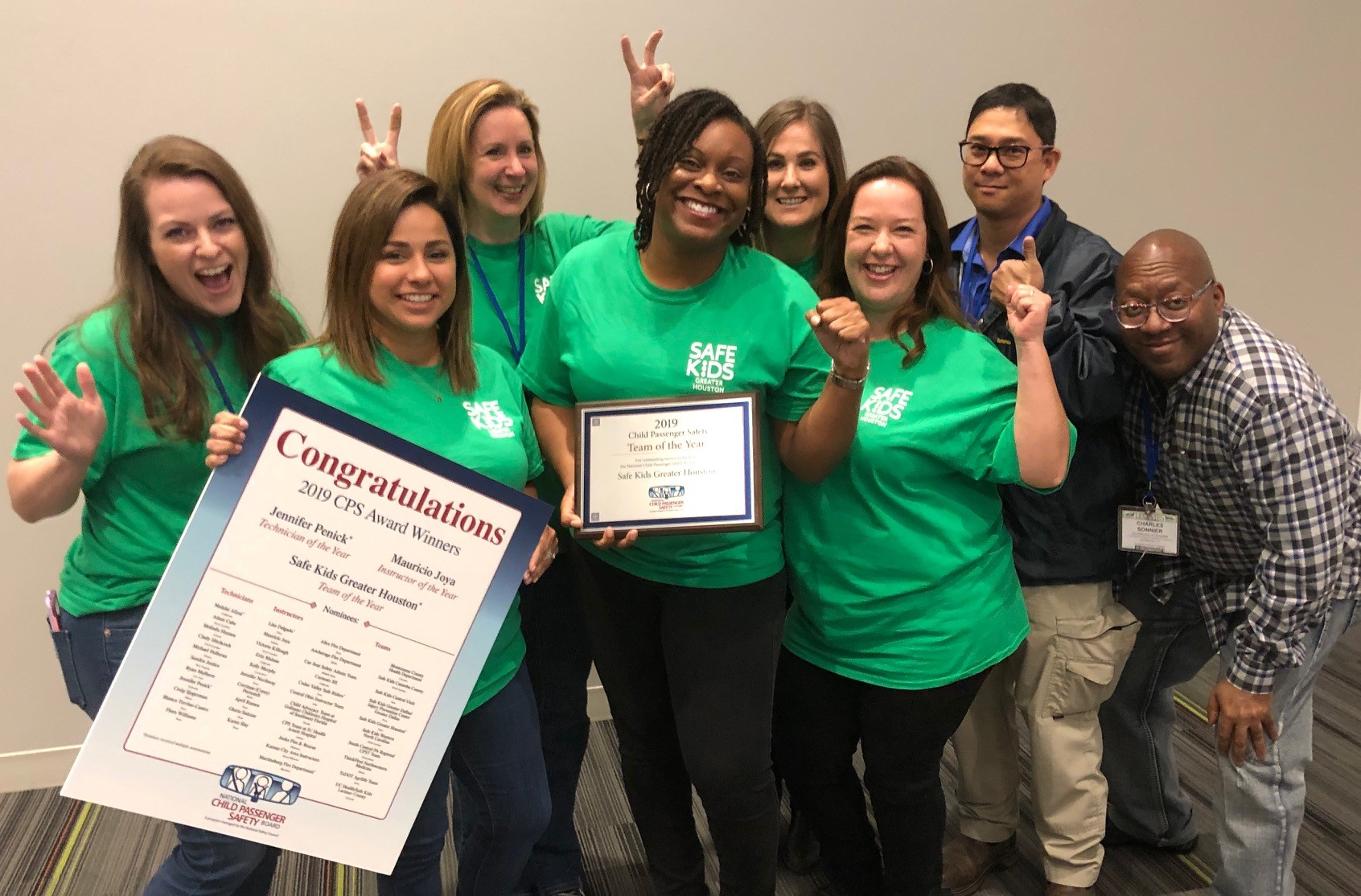
Safe Kids Greater Houston: 2019 Team of the Year

Each year, the Board recognizes men and women for their contributions to child passenger safety through its Technician, Instructor and Team of the Year awards program.

2024 Award Winners

- Delilah Darland, Montezuma County, CO, Technician of the year
- Danielle Kessenger, Florida, Instructor of the year
- Safe Kids Western North Carolina, Team of the year

2023 Award Winners

- Victoria Chandler, Kansas, Technician of the year
- Claudia Summers, Waxhaw, NC, Instructor of the year
- Clare Pfotenhauer, Illinois, Instructor of the year
- Nebraska Child Passenger Safety Advisory Committee, Team of the year

2022 Award Winners

- Marilyn Morris, Utah, Technician of the year
- Jackie Stackhouse Leach, New Jersey, Instructor of the year
- Salt River Pima-Maricopa (AZ) Indian Community Child Passenger Safety Team, Team of the year

2021 Award Winners

- Bailey Bakouris, Texas, Technician of the year
- Sidney Bradley, Vermont, Instructor of the year
- Jchanet Tan, Malaysia, International Instructor of the year
- Northern New Jersey Safe Kids/Safe Communities, Team of the year

2020 Award Winners

- Eduardo Medina, Columbia, Technician of the year:
- Jennifer Booge, Instructor of the year
- Louisiana Passenger Safety Task Force, Team of the year

2019 Award Winners

- Omaha's Jennifer Penick became the first person to posthumously receive the Technician of the Year award. Penick, who helped launch Car Seat for the Littles in 2010, was committed to securing children safely in their seats – most notably her own five-year-old daughter, who survived the same car crash that killed Penick and her husband, Adam, in June 2018. Their daughter, Unity, survived the head-on collision on Highway 50 near Schramm Road because she was properly harnessed in her car seat.
- Mauricio Joya of Indianapolis, IN, was named Instructor of the Year. He was featured in InScope, a weekly newsletter for faculty, staff and students from Indiana University School of Medicine.
- Safe Kids Greater Houston was the first recipient of the Team of the Year award.

2018 Award Winners

- Carina Ortiz, Bakersfield, CA, Instructor of the Year. She was featured on TurnTo23 ABC-TV in Bakersfield.
- Michael "Chris" Morris, Knightsdale, NC, Technician of the Year. He was featured as the man who has "helped babies for decades" by WRAL.com.

2017 Award Winners

- Allan Buchanan, Henderson, NC, Instructor of the Year. He is considered one of North Carolina's pioneers of child passenger safety.
- Brandi Ballinger, Longview, WA, Technician of the Year. She was dubbed the Queen of Car Seat Safety by The Daily News.

2016 Award Winners

- Mark Van Horn, Chadron, NE, Instructor of the Year.
- Patricia Corwin, Columbus, OH, Technician of the Year.

2015 Award Winners

- Suzanne Cash LeDoyen, Raleigh, NC, Instructor of the Year.
- Shawn Vovericz, West Chester, PA, Technician of the Year.

2014 Award Winners

- Jennifer Hoekstra, Grand Rapids, MI, Instructor of the Year.
- Sgt. Brian Cooper, Carol Stream, IL, Technician of the Year.

2013 Award Winners

- Bev Kellner, College Station, TX, Instructor of the Year.
- Amelia “Millie” Jensen, Dilkon, AZ, Technician of the Year.

2012 Award Winners

- Katrina Altenhofen, Washington County, IA, Instructor of the Year.
- Mandi Seethaler, Anchorage, AK, Technician of the Year.

2011 Award Winners

- Beth Washington, Tulsa, OK, Instructor of the Year.
- Giuseppina (Pina) Violano, New Haven, CT, Technician of the Year.
