= Safe Kids Worldwide =

American non-profit organization working to prevent childhood injury

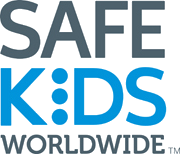
- Founded: 1988; 38 years ago by Martin R. Eichelberger, M.D. and Herta Feely in the United States
- Type: 501(c)(3) non-profit organization
- Purpose: Preventing childhood injury
- Headquarters: Washington, D.C.
- Location: Global
- Fields: Media attention, public awareness campaigns, research, lobbying
- Website: www.safekids.org

Safe Kids Worldwide (formerly Safe Kids USA) is an American non-profit organization working to prevent childhood injury through research, community outreach, legislative advocacy and media awareness campaigns. Safe Kids Worldwide has over 400 coalitions in 49 states, and has partners in over 30 countries. The proclaimed mission of Safe Kids Worldwide is "protecting kids from unintentional injuries, the number one cause of death for children in the United States." It is a 501(c) organization.

== Definition of preventable injury ==
Preventable injuries include car crashes, falls, burns, drownings, fires, medication poisoning, and similar harms. Safe Kids addresses unintentional injuries that can result in serious disability or death.

== Founding and history ==
Safe Kids was founded in 1988 by Dr. Martin Eichelberger, a pediatric trauma surgeon at Children's National Medical Center in Washington, D.C., and writer and public relations consultant Herta Feely. Dr. Eichelberger joined with Johnson & Johnson to create an organization dedicated to protecting children from preventable injuries. Dr. C. Everett Koop served as its chairman for its first 13 years. In 2011, the organization merged with the Home Safety Council, another non-profit organization with similar aims. The current president is Torine Creppy.

== Programs ==
Safe Kids Worldwide achieves this goal through a number of accident-specific prevention and awareness-promoting programs. Some of these programs include:

- Research: Safe Kids uses information from national injury databases and conducts original quantitative and qualitative research to explore how and why injuries happen and to develop effective behavior change strategies.
- Community Outreach: Safe Kids has more than 400 coalitions in the United States and more than 25 global partners. Safe Kids coalitions provide community education, organize car seat inspection stations, hold safety fairs and sports safety clinics, and provide information to local educators and media.
- Legislative advocacy: Safe Kids advocacy works at the local, state, federal and global level to ensure child safety is a top priority in the United States and around the world. Safe Kids works with partners around the world to elevate child safety issues on the around the world.d
- Safe Kids has also worked with government agencies, administrators, and partners to achieve legislative success in risk areas, including drowning (Virginia Graeme Baker Pool and Spa Safety Act), sports safety (concussions in sport) and teen driving (graduated driver licensing).
- Media Campaigns: Safe Kids uses social and traditional media to reach parents, educators, legislators, and medical and public safety workers. Safe Kids promotes several risk area specific campaigns each year on topics such as sports safety, child passenger safety and medication safety. The organization also engages in media initiatives to spread general safety tips, information for new parents, and children’s product recall information. In 2014 Safe Kids received two Telly awards for educational videos.

== Sponsors and funding ==
Safe Kids work is funded by corporate sponsors who underwrite its programs. Sponsors include the General Motors Foundation, FedEx and founding sponsor Johnson & Johnson.

== See also ==
- Alliance for Safe Children
- Adam Walsh Child Protection and Safety Act
- Child safety lock
- National Child Passenger Safety Board
