= List of presidents of Clark University =

Below is a list of presidents of Clark University in Worcester, Massachusetts.

| President | Field | Life | Tenure |
|---|---|---|---|
| G. Stanley Hall (University) | Psychology | 1846–1924 | 1888–1920 |
| Carroll D. Wright (College) | Statistics, Economics | 1840–1909 | 1902–1909 |
| Edmund C. Sanford (College) | Psychology | 1859–1924 | 1909–1920 |
| Wallace W. Atwood | Geography | 1872–1949 | 1920–1946 |
| Howard B. Jefferson | Philosophy, Theology | 1901–1983 | 1946–1967 |
| Frederick H. Jackson | English, History | 1919–2015 | 1967–1970 |
| Glenn W. Ferguson | International Affairs | 1929–2007 | 1970–1973 |
| Mortimer H. Appley | Psychology | 1921–2012 | 1974–1984 |
| Richard P. Traina | History | 1937–2011 | 1984–2000 |
| John E. Bassett | English | b. 1942 | 2000–2010 |
| David P. Angel | Geography | b. 1958 | 2010–2020 |
| David Fithian | Sociology | b. 1964 | 2020– |
