= David Fithian =

American college administrator (born 1964)

David B. Fithian

10th President of Clark University
- Incumbent
- Assumed office July 1, 2020
- Preceded by: David Angel

Executive Vice President of The University of Chicago
- In office March 30, 2014 – July 30, 2020
- Preceded by: David A. Greene
- Succeeded by: Katie Callow-Wright

Personal details
- Born: December 10, 1964 (age 61) North Tarrytown, New York, U.S.
- Spouse: Michael Rodriguez
- Relatives: Lisa Fithian (sister)
- Education: Clark University; Yale University
- Website: clarku.edu

David Brooks Fithian (born December 10, 1964) is an American academic administrator who currently serves as the president of Clark University. Previously, he served as executive vice president of the University of Chicago. Fithian was born in North Tarrytown, New York. His elder sister is the political activist Lisa Fithian.

== Education ==
After earning a B.A. degree in sociology from Clark University in 1987, Fithian attended Yale University where he received three graduate degrees (M.A., 1988; M.Phil, 1990; Ph.D., 1994, with highest honors) in sociology. Fithian's doctoral dissertation, for which he was advised by Kai Erikson, was awarded Yale's Theron Rockwell Field Prize in May 1994.

== Career ==
Following graduate training, Fithian began his professional career as Assistant Dean of Freshmen in Harvard College in 1995 and spent more than a decade there in progressively more senior positions culminating in the role of associate dean of the Faculty of Arts and Sciences before leaving Harvard in 2007 for the University of Chicago. At UChicago, Fithian served as vice president and Secretary of the University until March 2014 when he became Executive Vice President.

While at Harvard, Fithian taught courses for a number of years for the Committee on Degrees in Social Studies.

=== Clark University ===
On January 13, 2020, the trustees of Clark University announced that Fithian would succeed David P. Angel to become the university's 10th president. He began that role July 1, 2020, and is the first alumnus to lead the institution. Fithian's first semester as president was impacted by the COVID-19 pandemic and racial equality protests on campus.

In April 2025, Fithian was one of more than 200 higher education leaders who signed a letter protesting government overreach by the Trump administration. Thirteen international students at Clark had had their visas revoked. Fithian also added Clark to the amicus brief in American Association of University Professors v. Rubio, a case contesting the visa revocation of students.

In June 2025, Fithian announced plans for substantial cutbacks and restructuring at the university due to lower enrollment and changing public attitudes toward college, including laying off a quarter of faculty over the next two years. The school also lost $1.5 million in grant funding from the federal government.

== Other interests ==
Fithian served as a trustee of the Marine Biological Laboratory (2014–2024) in Woods Hole, Massachusetts, and on the boards of Chapin Hall (2013–2019) and Court Theatre (2011–2014) at the University of Chicago.
