= Downing Street (disambiguation) =

Downing Street is a street in London, England, that houses the official residence of the Prime Minister and other government offices.

Downing Street may also refer to:

- Downing Street, Cambridge, England
- Downing Street, George Town, Penang, Malaysia
- Downing Street School, a historic school building at 92 Downing Street in Worcester, Massachusetts
- 10 Downing Street, the address of the First Lord of the Treasury and Prime Minister of the United Kingdom
