= Glenn W. Ferguson =

American diplomat and university president

6th President of the American University of Paris
- In office 1992–1995
- Preceded by: Catherine Ingold
- Succeeded by: Lee Huebner

9th President of the University of Connecticut
- In office 1973–1978
- Preceded by: Homer D. Babbidge, Jr.
- Succeeded by: John A. DiBiaggio

7th President of Clark University
- In office 1970–1973
- Preceded by: Frederick H. Jackson
- Succeeded by: Mortimer H. Appley

2nd United States Ambassador to Kenya
- In office September 16, 1966 – April 7, 1969
- President: Lyndon B. Johnson
- Preceded by: William Attwood
- Succeeded by: Robinson McIlvaine

Personal details
- Born: January 28, 1929 Syracuse, New York, U.S.
- Died: December 20, 2007 (aged 78) Santa Fe, New Mexico, U.S.
- Spouse: Patricia Head Ferguson
- Education: Cornell University (B.A.); Cornell University (M.B.A.); University of Pittsburgh (J.D.)
- Profession: Diplomat and academic administrator

Glenn Walker Ferguson (January 28, 1929 – December 20, 2007) was an American diplomat and university president. He served as United States Ambassador to Kenya (1966–1969), chancellor of Long Island University (1969–1970), and president of Clark University (1970–1973), the University of Connecticut (1973–1978), and the American University of Paris (1992–1995).

== Early life ==
Ferguson was born in Syracuse, New York, on January 28, 1929, the only child of Forrest and Mabel Walker Ferguson. He grew up mostly in Bethesda, Maryland, where he graduated from Bethesda-Chevy Chase High School.

== Education ==
Ferguson earned a bachelor's degree in economics in 1950 and an MBA in 1951, both from Cornell University, where he also played competitive football, baseball, and track. He was about to be signed as a pitcher by the Washington Senators when an arm injury ended his professional baseball career before it began. He served as a lieutenant in the U.S. Air Force during the Korean War, assigned to a psychological warfare unit that wrote propaganda leaflets for dropping behind enemy lines. According to his wife, Ferguson enjoyed his military service — he "thought it was a hoot."

Ferguson studied law and international relations at Georgetown University and the University of Chicago and earned his juris doctor from the University of Pittsburgh in 1957. He never practiced law, instead remaining firmly in the sphere of international relations and public administration. He spent a year abroad in 1952–1953 at the University of Santo Tomas in the Philippines, researching East Asian systems of government.

== Career ==
Between 1957 and 1960, Ferguson taught as an assistant professor of international affairs at Pitt, worked as an administrative assistant to the chancellor, served as assistant dean in the Graduate School of Public and International Affairs, and consulted for McKinsey and Company.

Ferguson spent the 1960s as a civil servant in the Peace Corps, AmeriCorps, and Department of State. In 1961, Ferguson became the first Peace Corps director in Thailand. From 1962 to 1964 he served as associate Peace Corps director in Washington and special assistant to Sargent Shriver. Ferguson was the first director of Volunteers in Service to America (VISTA) from 1964 to 1966. He served as United States Ambassador to Kenya from 1966 to 1969. He served a stormy eleven months as chancellor of Long Island University, from which position he resigned in 1970 after the university's trustees rejected his proposal to split LIU into four autonomous institutions. He then served as president of Clark University in Worcester, Massachusetts, from 1970 to 1973. Effective September 1, 1973, he became the ninth president of the University of Connecticut.

=== University of Connecticut ===
Ferguson had a difficult tenure as UConn president. He assumed the presidency just when the state government under Republican governor Thomas Meskill was demanding the university slash costs. The state's annual appropriation declined from $34.5 million in 1971–72 to $30.3 million in 1975–76, a cut of over 12 percent. Tuition increased from 1975 to 1978, rising from $2,800 per year for in-state students in 1975 to $3,400 in 1978.

Faculty and staff unionized in the early 1970s amid declining compensation rates compared to other research universities. The University of Connecticut Professional Employees Association (UCPEA) for most staff and the American Association of University Professors (AAUP) for faculty were established at the university for the first time. Ferguson opposed ultimately unsuccessful efforts by Governor Ella Grasso to consolidate all of Connecticut's public institutions of higher education under a single board of regents, which would have limited UConn's autonomy.

Ferguson grew the university's physical plant during his five years. As library materials and student enrollment had far outgrown capacity in the old Wilbur Cross Library, Ferguson lobbied strongly for a new library. In July 1975, UConn broke ground on a new 385,000-square-foot building that would become the Homer Babbidge Library, completed in 1978. Also under Ferguson, the UConn bookstore moved to a cooperative model in 1973 after the failed ownership of Follett. Ground was broken for a new School of Fine Arts building. The Psychology, Institute of Materials Science, and Physics buildings were completed. At the University of Connecticut Health Center, the John N. Dempsey Hospital opened its doors.

Like President Homer D. Babbidge Jr. before him, Ferguson faced intensive student activism over social justice issues. When students protesting racism, in violation of Connecticut law, peacefully occupied the Wilbur Cross Library, Ferguson sent in state police to evict the protestors, four of whom reported injuries and one of whom spent days in the infirmary. The Connecticut Civil Liberties Union and the NAACP condemned Ferguson's heavy-handed response and demanded that charges against the protestors be dropped. Ferguson never attained Babbidge's popularity with students or faculty.

During Ferguson's tenure, the university also faced a class-action lawsuit by female professors alleging gender discrimination.

Ferguson resigned in April 1978 to pursue other opportunities.

=== Later career ===
Following his departure as UConn president in 1978, Ferguson served a five-year term as chief executive of Radio Free Europe/Radio Liberty. In 1983, Ferguson, who had not applied for the job but came recommended by the directors, was named president of Lincoln Center. Disliking New York City and the primarily administrative duties of the position, he resigned after only nine months. He later served as president of the American University of Paris from 1992 to 1995.

Starting in the 1990s, Ferguson authored several books, including Unconventional Wisdom: A Primer of Provocative Aphorisms (1999), Americana Against the Grain (1999), Tilting at Religion (2003), Sports in America (2004) and Traveling the Exotic (2005).

Ferguson served as founder and president of Equity for Africa, an early provider of microloans to rural entrepreneurs. He also was a member of the Council on Foreign Relations, the Pacific Council on International Policy, and other organizations.

== Personal life ==
Ferguson married Patricia Lou Head of Falls Church, Virginia, in 1950. The couple had two sons, Bruce and Scott, and a daughter, Sherry. Sherry Ferguson married Robert Zoellick, who served as the 11th President of the World Bank Group.

Ferguson died on December 20, 2007, from prostate cancer at his home in Santa Fe, New Mexico, where he had lived since 1998. He was survived by his wife and children.

Diplomatic posts
Preceded by William Attwood	United States Ambassador to Kenya; 1966–1969	Succeeded by Robinson McIlvaine
