= Lisa Fithian =

American political activist

Lisa Fithian (born 1960 or 1961) is an American political activist and protest consultant.

== Early life and education ==
Fithian was born in 1960 or 1961 and grew up in Hawthorne, New York. During high school, Fithian launched an underground newspaper called The Free Thinker, which focused on topics such as social justice and free speech, reflecting her early interest in activism. She began her work in the mid-1970s as a member of her high school's student government, where she served as president. She continued advocacy work as president of the Skidmore College Student Government Association. She graduated from Skidmore in 1983. Her brother David Fithian is the 10th president of Clark University in Worcester, MA.

== Activism ==
Fithian served from 1980 to 1987 as a member and coordinator of the Washington Peace Center. During her tenure, she led and organized hundreds of events and demonstrations on a range of issues, locally and nationally. She led an organizational extensive anti-racism initiative, facilitated educational workshops, and supported campaigns addressing issues such as nuclear disarmament and racial justice. This helped transform the Peace Center into a multicultural organization.

In the early 1990s, Fithian joined the labor movement, bringing her experience to the Justice for Janitors campaigns in Washington, D.C., Denver, and Los Angeles. She continued her work for social, economic, and environmental justice, providing training and organizing support to many of the global-justice mobilizations around the world since the shutdown of the World Trade Organization Ministerial in Seattle in 1999.

After Hurricane Katrina, Fithian worked with the Common Ground Collective in New Orleans.

Fithian previously served as a National Steering Committee member of United for Peace and Justice, a coalition of over 1,000 local and national groups working to end the war in Iraq. She was also a member of the national team of Extinction Rebellion.

In April 2024, she reportedly played a significant role in the pro Palestinian protests at Columbia University. She was observed providing guidance to the students protesting for divestment from Israel, who launched an occupation of Hamilton Hall on April 29. She instructed them on barricading techniques and crowd management. The New York City Police Department labeled her a "professional agitator" in footage released during a press conference, highlighting her influence in escalating the protests.

== Writings ==
Fithian has written throughout the years, including the 2007 book anthology What Lies Beneath: Katrina, Race, and the State of the Nation by South End Press. She wrote the 2019 book Shut It Down: Stories from a Fierce, Loving Resistance.

== In popular culture ==
- Lisa Fithian is mentioned in the 2015 Canibus song "Mr. Montana... Thank You"
