= Robinson McIlvaine =

American diplomat (1913–2001)

United States Ambassador to Dahomey
- In office July 31, 1961 – March 19, 1964
- President: John F. Kennedy; Lyndon B. Johnson
- Preceded by: R. Borden Reams
- Succeeded by: Clinton E. Knox

United States Ambassador to Guinea
- In office October 27, 1966 – September 25, 1969
- President: Lyndon B. Johnson

United States Ambassador to Kenya
- In office September 30, 1969 – April 4, 1973
- President: Richard Nixon
- Preceded by: Glenn W. Ferguson
- Succeeded by: Anthony D. Marshall

Personal details
- Born: July 17, 1913 Downingtown, Pennsylvania, U.S.
- Died: June 24, 2001 (aged 87) Washington, D.C., U.S.
- Profession: Diplomat

Military service
- Branch/service: United States Navy

Robinson McIlvaine (July 17, 1913 – June 24, 2001) was an American career diplomat who was President of the African Wildlife Foundation from 1978 to 1982.

== Early years ==
McIlvaine was born in Downingtown, Pennsylvania, in 1913. He graduated from Harvard College. McIlvaine served in the U.S. Navy in Panama prior to the Attack on Pearl Harbor in December 1941. He was made commanding officer of a submarine chaser in the Guadalcanal area, and later became captain of a destroyer escort on Atlantic convoy duty, reaching the rank of Commander.

McIlvaine's first wife, Jane McClary, was a writer for the Times Herald and Fortune magazine. After they married, in 1946 McIlvaine became the owner, editor and publisher of The Archive, a Downingtown weekly that had been founded 1853 but was no longer much more than an advertising sheet, with 1,750 subscribers. Jane wrote a book about their years at the paper called It Happens Every Thursday. The book was made into a movie starring John Forsythe and Loretta Young, and then into a television series.

While an editor, McIlvaine became active in Republican politics. Leaving the paper, he joined the State Department in 1953 as Deputy Assistant Secretary of State for Public Affairs. He held the posts of Deputy Chief of Mission in Lisbon and Director of the Inter-Departmental Seminar. He became Chairman of the U.S. Section of the Caribbean Commission.

== Diplomatic career ==
McIlvaine was Consul General at Leopoldville in the Democratic Republic of the Congo from 1960 to 1961. In July 1960 McIlvaine responded to the White House inquiry on the first President, Patrice Lumumba. He said "Lumumba is an opportunist and not a communist". In 1961 McIlvaine was appointed Ambassador to Dahomey (now Benin), holding the post until March 19, 1964. McIlvaine's name was submitted in 1966 for the post of Ambassador to Senegal, but was rejected by President Lyndon Johnson who was against having another Harvard graduate for the post. However, when his friend Averell Harriman submitted his name for Ambassador to Guinea nobody else wanted the job and he was accepted.

Two days after he arrived as ambassador in Conakry, Guinea, McIlvaine and all other Americans in the country were put under house arrest. The detention was ordered by president Ahmed Sékou Touré in response to the arrest of 19 Guineans, including the Guinean foreign minister by Ghanaian authorities in Accra. Touré accused the U.S. of being behind the arrest. Ghana said the Guineans would be freed only if Guinea released 100 Ghanaians, who it said were being held illegally. After Ghana released their hostages, McIlvaine was able to defuse the situation and even to get an apology from President Touré. Although Washington later made a fuss about the Cuban presence in Guinea and other African countries, McIlvaine said "The State Department was not particularly concerned with the Cuban presence. It was not a big worry for us".

In 1969 McIlvaine left Guinea and was appointed Ambassador to Kenya, holding this position until he retired in 1973.

== Later career ==
McIlvaine left the Foreign Service in 1973. He was head of the Nairobi office of the African Wildlife Leadership Foundation (now African Wildlife Foundation) for two years, then returned to Washington to become President of the AWLF. One of the most successful projects he initiated was formation of a consortium to protect the threatened mountain gorillas of Rwanda. The AWLF had assisted Dian Fossey in her study of mountain gorillas in Rwanda in the 1960s. Robinson McIlvaine later said that "There would be no mountain gorillas in the Virungas today ... were it not for Dian Fossey's tireless efforts over many years".

According to Farley Mowat in his book Woman in the Mists, Dian Fossey asked Robinson McIlvaine to serve as secretary-treasurer of the Digit Fund while he was AWLF President until she could find a salaried executive director to take over. She had created the fund to finance patrols against poachers seeking to kill mountain gorillas. McIlvaine partnered with the International Primate Protection League, the Digit Fund, and his own AWLF asking for funds, to be made out to the AWLF. The Digit Fund received none of the money, and McIlvaine suggested to Fossey that the Digit Fund could be folded into AWLF, which Fossey declined. McIlvaine resigned as secretary-treasurer of the Digit Fund.

McIlvaine retired from the AWLF in 1982. He died at his home in Washington, D.C., on June 24, 2001, at the age of 87. McIlvaine was survived by his second wife, Alice Nicolson McIlvaine, who he married in 1961, and by two sons, a daughter and three grandchildren. Mia McIlvaine Merle-Smith, a daughter by his first marriage, was lost at sea while trying to sail across the Atlantic with her husband in 1971.

Diplomatic posts
Preceded by James I. Loeb	United States Ambassador to Guinea; 1966–1969	Succeeded by Albert W. Sherer Jr.
Preceded by Glenn W. Ferguson	United States Ambassador to Kenya; 1969–1973	Succeeded by Anthony D. Marshall
