= Abbott Street School =

- U.S. National Register of Historic Places
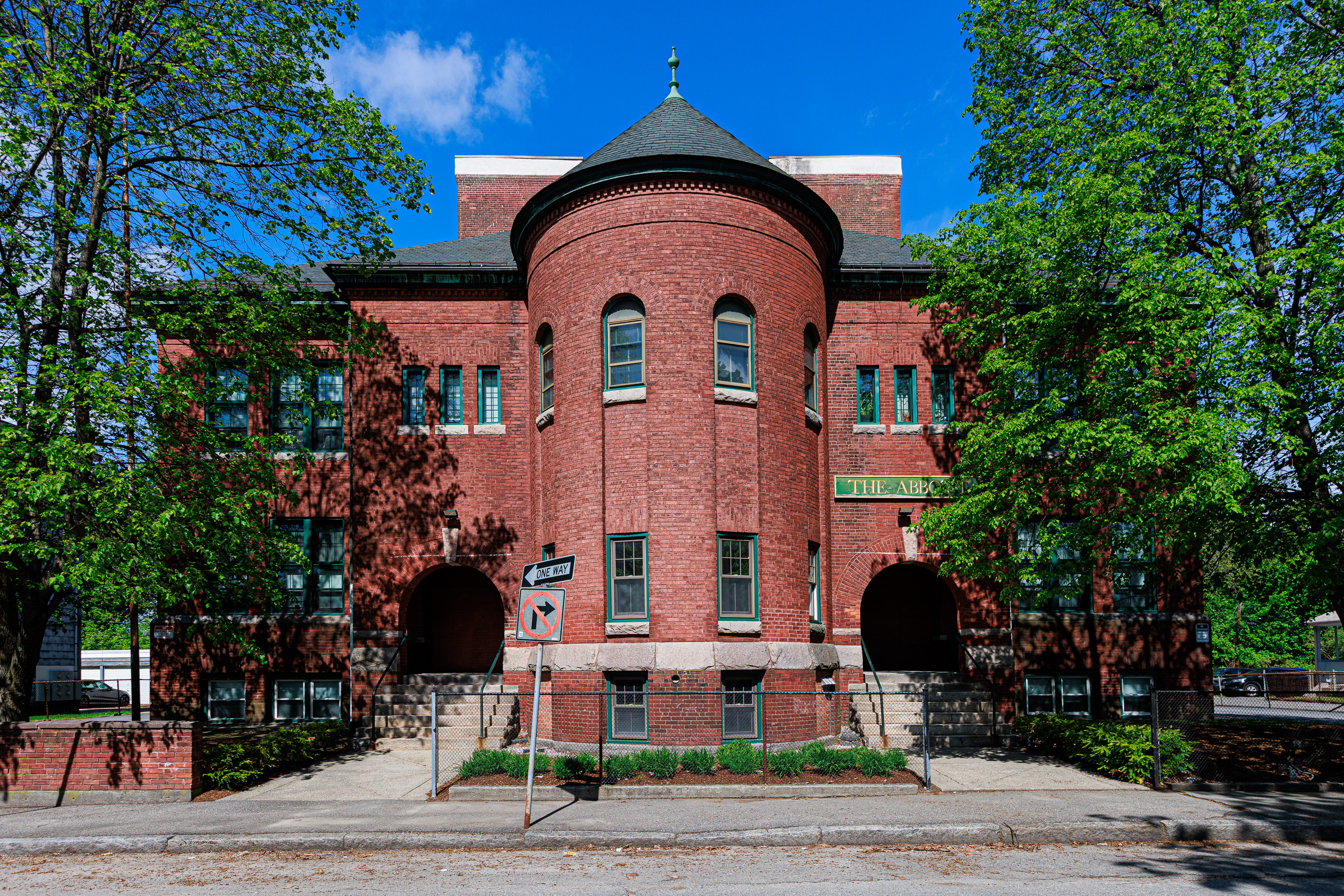

- Location within Massachusetts Location within the United States
- Location: 36 Abbott St., Worcester, MA
- Coordinates: 42°15′45.95″N 71°49′18.64″W
- Area: less than one acre
- Built: 1894
- Architect: W. R. Forbush
- Architectural style: Romanesque
- MPS: Worcester MRA
- NRHP reference No.: 80000595
- Added to NRHP: March 5, 1980

The Abbott Street School is a historic school building at 36 Abbott Street in Worcester, Massachusetts. Built in 1894, it is a good local example of Romanesque Revival architecture. It served as a public school until 1981, after which it was converted to residential use. The building was listed on the National Register of Historic Places in 1980.

== Description and history ==
The former Abbott Street School is located west of downtown Worcester, on the west side of Abbott Street between Pleasant and Chandler Streets. It is a 2-1/2 story brick building with a hip roof and Romanesque Revival styling. Its most prominent feature is a projecting central turret, topped by a conical roof. It has a dentillated cornice, and round-arch windows on the second floor of the turret. Windows have rusticated granite sills, and there is a wide stone water table between the basement and ground floors. The main entrances flank the turret on either side, projecting slightly from the main block and recessed under round-arch openings with a granite keystone. A two-story addition extends to the rear.

The school was designed by Boston architect William Forbush and built in 1894. Stylistically it is similar to the 1891 Downing Street School, also designed by Forbush, but with less elaborate trim. It was built by B.C. Jacques at a cost of $20,000. In 1905-06 it was enlarged, with a sympathetic design by Worcester builder J. William Patston. The city operated the school until 1981, after which it was converted to residential use.

== See also ==
- National Register of Historic Places listings in northwestern Worcester, Massachusetts
- National Register of Historic Places listings in Worcester County, Massachusetts
