= Robert H. Goddard Library =

Clark University main library

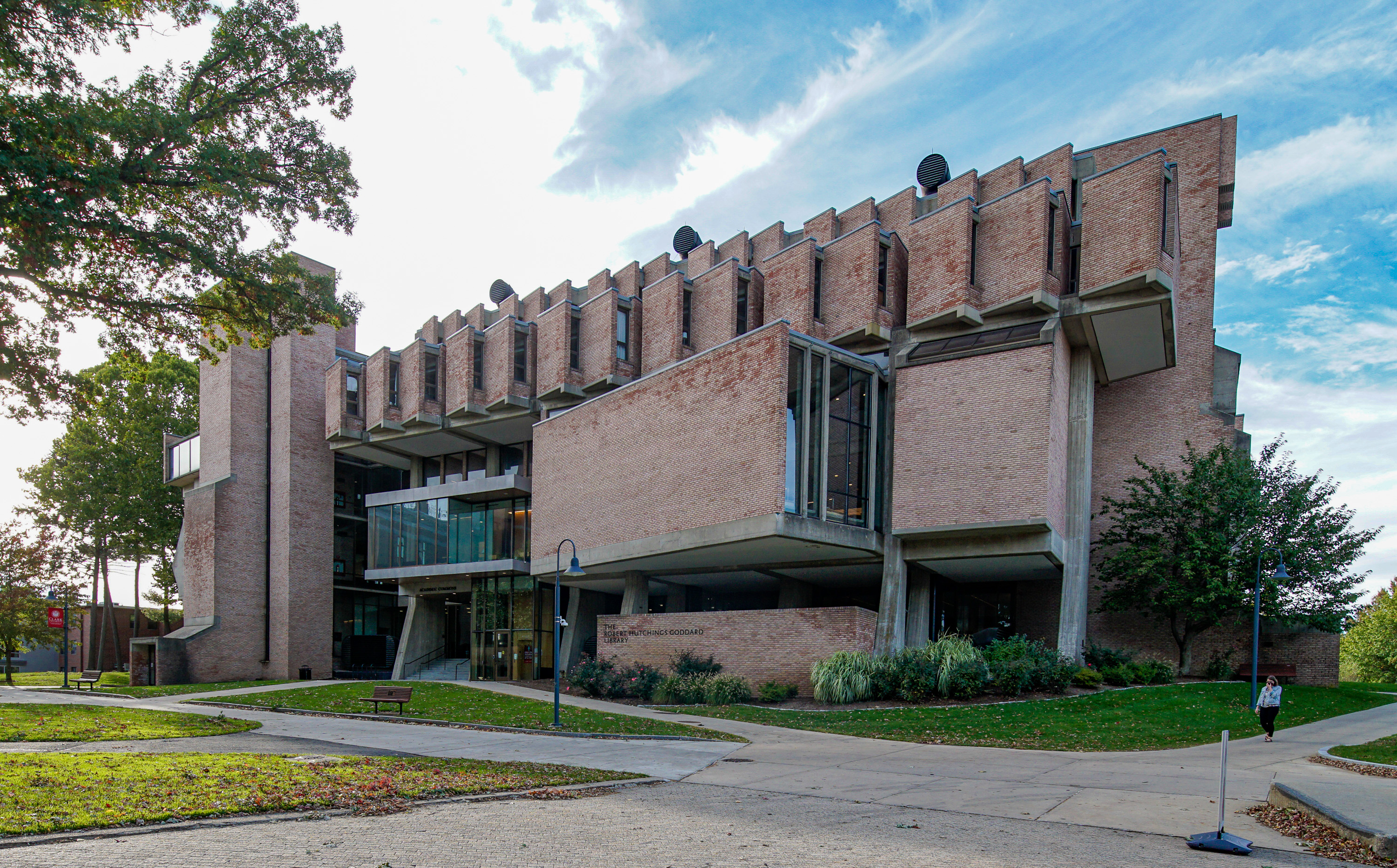
- Goddard Library in 2020
- 42°15′6″N 71°49′23″W
- Location: Worcester, Massachusetts, United States
- Established: 1969

Access and use
- Population served: Clark University

Other information
- Website: Goddard Library at Clark University

The Robert H. Goddard Library is the primary library of Clark University in Worcester, Massachusetts, United States. The library was named after scientist Robert H. Goddard, a Clark professor, whose experiments in rocketry led to the American space race. The building was designed by architect John M. Johansen in the Brutalist style.

== History ==
=== Pre-Goddard ===
The inclusion and discussion of libraries have played a long-standing role in the history of Clark's architecture. William Koelsch's book, Clark University 1887-1987: A Narrative History, describes this in further detail. Near the end of the 19th century and the beginning of the 20th, a chemistry teacher had a disagreement with the university librarian regarding a proposal to relocate 300 books and journals from the main library to have a departmental library in close proximity to his laboratories. Later on, a new library was constructed after $150,000 was provided for the project from founder Jonas Clark's will.

=== Goddard Library Construction ===
Plans for another library building were acted on after the Board of Trustees approved the Clark Program, a decade-long development initiative, the primary focus of which was planned to be a new library. The building would serve as an international memorial to the scientific experiments of Robert Goddard, and was intended to resolve the reported need for space expansion. The architect of the library was John M. Johansen, a designer of various types of buildings throughout the U.S., as well as a Harvard graduate and a member of the Harvard Five. A 1966 New York Times article reported that September 1968 was the intended completion date for the building's construction. Johansen described the library as a "giant, electronic machine" and his design envisaged a three-story structure containing books, with rooms for services such as reading and study.

The library was financed by a variety of sources. One of those was the Rockwell foundation, which provided a $75,000 gift. Prior to this, the fundraising efforts escalated to a national scale when the President of North American Aviation led the fund-raising initiative. On May 19, 1969, the Goddard Library was dedicated in a ceremony attended by the likes of U.S Senator Ted Kennedy, and Esther Goddard, the widow of Robert H. Goddard who was responsible for cutting the ribbon. Also in attendance at the dedication were John Leland Atwood, president of the North American Rockwell Corp; library architect John M. Johansen; Clark trustee Alice C. Higgins; Student Council President Michael Feldman; and astronaut Buzz Aldrin. Aldrin was honored with an honorary degree at the dedication ceremony.

== Academic Commons at Goddard Library ==
The Academic Commons at Goddard Library is a study space opened in January 2009 as part of the building's renovations. It includes Clark's primary computer lab, a cafe and study space.

The library also houses the ITS Help Desk, which aids the student body, as well as faculty and staff, in the plaza area in the Academic Commons.

== Collections and features ==
The Dr. Robert H. Goddard Collection and the Robert Goddard Exhibition Room are housed in the Archives and Special Collections area of the library. Outside the library lies a structure depicting the flight path of Goddard's first liquid fuel rocket. In 2008, the library digitized Goddard's collection through a 40,000 dollar grant from the federal Institute of Museum and Library Services.
