= Leah Penniman =

Farmer, educator, and food sovereignty activist

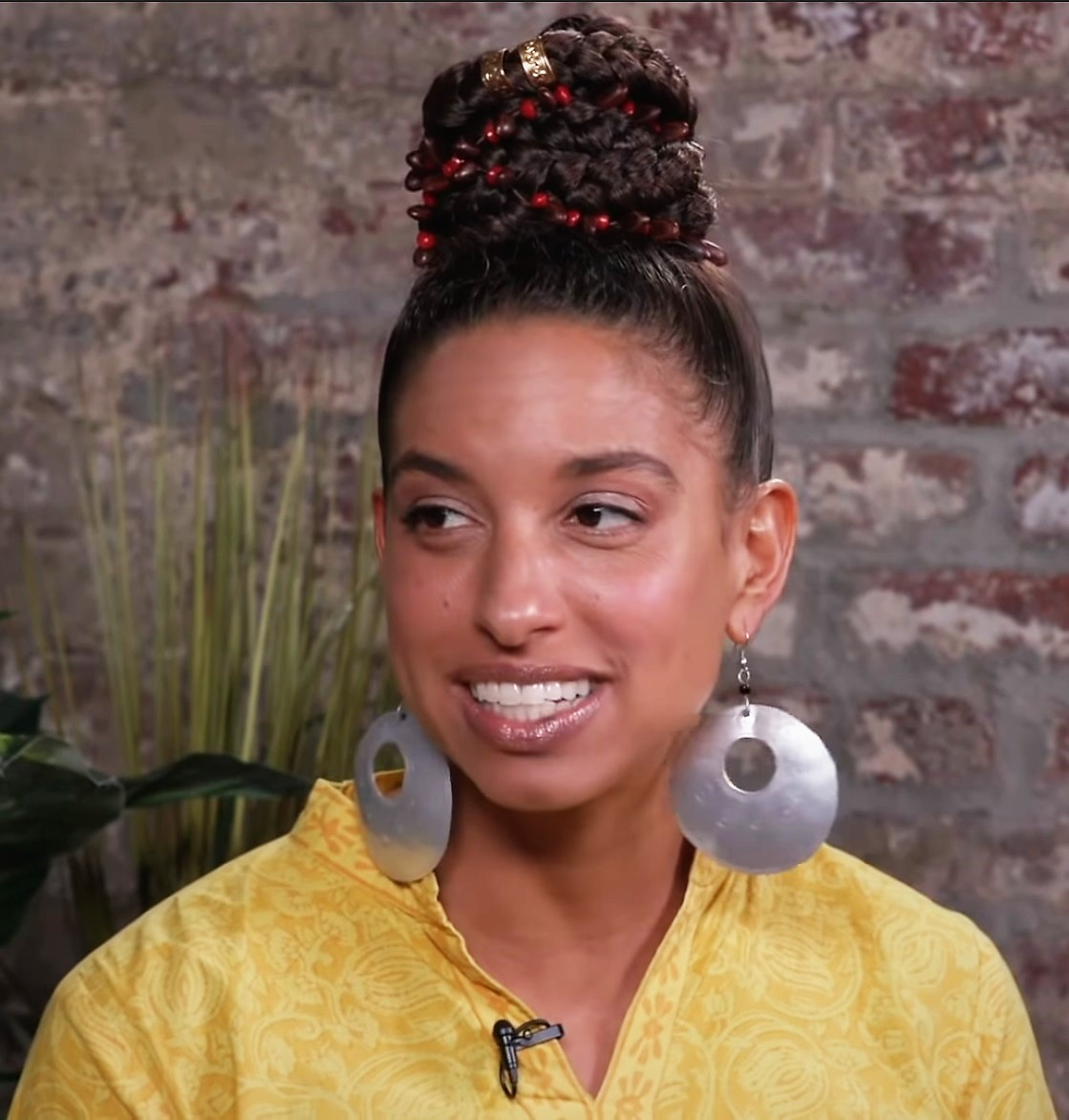
- Penniman on The Laura Flanders Show in 2019
- Born: 1980 (age 45–46); Massachusetts
- Citizenship: United States
- Education: Clark University (BA, MA)
- Occupations: Farmer, educator, author. Co-executive director of Farm Operations, Soul Fire Farm
- Writing career
- Notable awards: James Beard Foundation Leadership Award

Leah Penniman (multi-pronoun), (c. 1980) is an American farmer, educator, author, and food sovereignty activist. Penniman is co-founder, co-director and Program Manager of Soul Fire Farm, in Grafton, New York.

== Biography ==
Leah Penniman was born to Reverend doctor Adele Smith Penniman, an African-American and Haitian American pastor and activist, and a white father. Penniman was raised in Massachusetts with two siblings. Her interest in nature began in her childhood, as nature provided an escape from the racial discrimination that Penniman claimed to have suffered. Penniman began farming as a teenager, working with The Food Project, a Boston- based, nonprofit food producer. Their passion for farming continued as they attended farming conferences throughout Massachusetts. Penniman received an MA in Science Education and BA in Environmental Science and International Development from Clark University. After graduation, Penniman lived in a food desert in Albany, New York and after the birth of her first child, they received assistance from an organization that facilitates nutrition to at risk individuals. While living in Albany, Penniman had limited access to fresh produce. Penniman and her husband Jonah Vitale-Wolff were able to acquire vegetables for their children, though the cost totaled more than that of their rental payment. Their desire to provide high quality food inspired the creation of Soul Fire Farm, which officially opened in 2011. The name is taken from the song Soulfire by Lee "Scratch" Perry and originally focused on a farm share for low-income people.

In 2017, She was named a Soros Equality Fellow, offered through the Open Society Foundation.

In 2018, Penniman published Farming While Black. In 2019, Penniman was awarded the James Beard Foundation Leadership Award after a variety of food accessibility initiatives were established through her input.

In 2023, Penniman published her second book, "Black Earth Wisdom: Soulful Conversations with Black Environmentalists" (Harper Collins/Amistad, February 2023)
