= Downing Street School =

- U.S. National Register of Historic Places
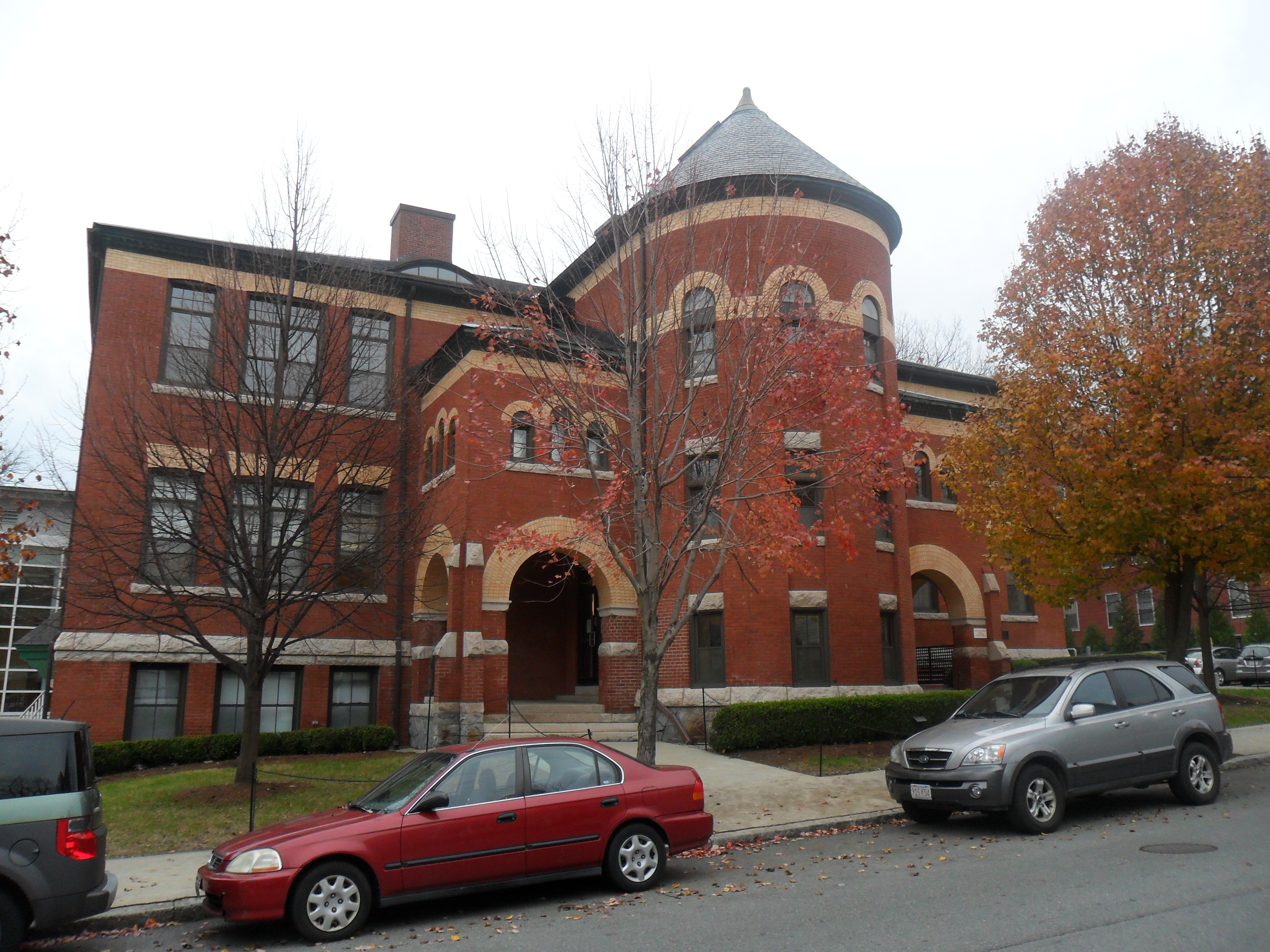
- The Traina Center for the Arts, otherwise known as Downing Street School

- Location within Massachusetts Location within the United States
- Location: 92 Downing St., Worcester, Massachusetts
- Coordinates: 42°15′14″N 71°49′29″W
- Built: 1891
- Architect: Forbush, W.R.
- Architectural style: Romanesque
- MPS: Worcester MRA
- NRHP reference No.: 80000621
- Added to NRHP: March 05, 1980

The former Downing Street School, now the Traina Center for the Arts of Clark University, is a historic school building at 92 Downing Street in Worcester, Massachusetts. Built in 1891 to a design by Boston-based architect William Forbush, it is a high-quality local example of Romanesque Revival architecture. The building was listed on the National Register of Historic Places in 1980.

== Architecture and history ==
The Traina Center is located on the east side of Downing Street in southern Worcester, just north of the central campus of Clark University. It is a two-story brick building, with a hip roof and trim of granite and yellow brick. Its principal feature is a projecting section on its main facade, which has a three-story central rounded section. This is flanked by two-story projecting sections with large round-arch openings that shelter the building entrances. A rusticated stone beltcourse separates the basement from the first floor, and similar stone is used for the window sills, and some of the window lintels on the rounded section. Arched windows and openings are highlighted in yellow brick, which is also used for some window lintels, and a frieze band above the second floor.

The building was built in 1891 to a design by Boston-based architect William Forbush. Forbush, about whom little is known, is also credited with the design of the Abbott Street School, which is similar to this one. It was used as a public school until at least 1980. Today it serves as the Traina Center for the Arts of Clark University; it houses an art gallery, and the university added a performance space to the rear of the building.

== See also ==
- National Register of Historic Places listings in southwestern Worcester, Massachusetts
- National Register of Historic Places listings in Worcester County, Massachusetts
