= Wallace Walter Atwood =

American geographer and geologist (1872–1949)

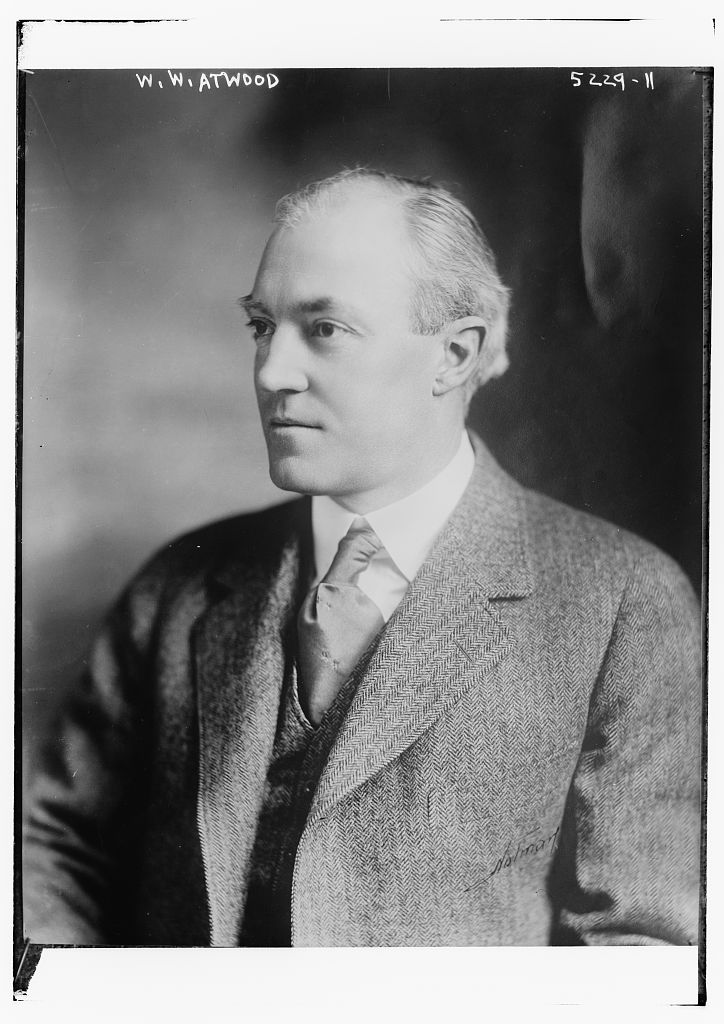
Wallace Walter Atwood c. 1920

Wallace Walter Atwood (October 1, 1872 – July 24, 1949) was an American geographer and geologist.

== Biography ==
Wallace Walter Atwood studied geography at the University of Chicago, where he was a member of the Delta Kappa Epsilon fraternity. He graduated in 1897 and earned his doctorate in 1903, after which he was Associate Professor of Geology at the University of Chicago until 1913. He was a professor of Physiography at Harvard from 1913 to 1920. He was elected president of Clark University in 1920 and assumed that position until 1946. As president of Clark University, he ordered in 1922, that the lights be turned off while Scott Nearing was addressing a Liberal Club on socialism on the campus of the University, which won him great renown. On this occasion, he wrote the pamphlet Extra-Curricula activities and academic freedom. He also banned The Nation magazine from the Clark University campus.

Walter Wallace Atwood was also president of the international film foundation, whose purpose was to centralize the production and distribution of pedagogical films. He was elected president of the Worcester Economic Club from 1923 to 1924. He was elected a Fellow of the American Academy of Arts and Sciences in 1915.

== Legacy ==
Mount Atwood is named after him. He was President of the National Parks Association from 1929 to 1933.

== Publications ==
- Physical geography of the Evanston-Waukegan region (Urbana: University of Illinois, 1908)
- America across the seas; our colonial empire (New York: C. S. Hammond & company, 1909)
- New geography (Boston: Ginn and University, 1920)
- New geography book II (Boston: Ginn and Company, 1920)
- Teaching the new geography (Boston: Ginn and University, 1921)
- Inauguration of Wallace Walter Atwood as President of Clark University, February 1, 1921
- Extra-curricula activities and academic freedom (Worcester, Mass.: Clark University library, 1922)
