= Soul Fire Farm =

Community farm in Grafton, New York, United States

- Town/City: Grafton, New York
- Country: United States
- Coordinates: 42.767170°N 73.410667°W
- Established: 2010
- Owner: Leah Penniman
- Area: 72-acre (0.29 km^{2})

Soul Fire Farm is a community farm in Grafton, New York, United States. The farm is Black, Indigenous, and People of Color (BIPOC)-centered and uses organic and ancestral farming techniques to combat racism and injustice in the food system. It is owned by Leah Penniman.

== About ==
Soul Fire Farm is a 72-acre farm located in Grafton, New York and was purchased by Leah Penniman and Jonah Vitale-Wolff in 2006. The farm officially opened in 2010. The name is taken from the song Soulfire by Lee “Scratch” Perry and began as a farm share for low-income individuals. As the farm grew, it developed a mission to end racism and injustice in the food system by reclaiming the inherent right to belong to the earth and to create agency in the food system for black and brown people.

The food is intensively cultivated using organic and ancestral techniques that increase topsoil depth, sequester carbon, and increase soil biodiversity. To help capture carbon, the farm grows mostly perennials and practices silvopasture, where livestock grazes in orchards, to mitigate the effects of climate change. The buildings on the farm are constructed by hand, using local wood, adobe, straw bales, solar heat, and reclaimed materials. The team of workers and activists at the farm bring together diverse communities to share information and skills on sustainable agriculture, natural building, spiritual activism, health, and environmental justice through their programs.

The farm's flagship program is the Black Latino Farmers Immersion, a 50-hour course to train beginner farmers. As of 2018, 500 people had taken the course. In 2020, the farm made plans to expand and began raising money to better support accommodations for hosting the over 3,000 visitors that visit annually.

== Programs ==
=== Soul Fire Farm Share ===
Soul Fire Farm Share is a Community Supported Agriculture program that delivers freshly grown produce each week to farm share members in Troy and Albany, New York. The program is based on the spirit of Ujaama, an ideology of cooperative economics. Payments are made according to an income based sliding-scale and EBT payments are accepted. This program also provides "#solidarityshares", for immigrants, refugees, and those impacted by state violence. Describing the program, Penniman says: "We are committed to working with the most marginalized issues. It's a different economic model. It's about relationships. It's not just a model of selling."

=== Black and Latinx Farmers Immersion ===
The program teaches novice and intermediate growers the basic skills of regenerative farming and has trained over 350 farmers since 2011. The training covers skills like planting, transplanting, harvesting, compost, pest management, processing chickens, and use of medicinal herbs. The program supplies the tools for additional comprehensive commercial farm training. Participants learn in a culturally relevant and supportive environment that helps them connect to the land and understand "trauma rooted in oppression on land.”

=== Uprooting Racism Immersion ===
The workshop provides farming and food justice leaders with theory and action. Participants examine the history of food injustice and then devise strategies to end the systemic racism in the food system.

=== Youth Program ===
The goal of this program is to reconnect youth to their innate belonging to the land and to restore each person's rightful place of empowerment in the food system. It exposes young people to harvesting, cooking and food justice knowledge through one day workshops, including inter-generational groups. From 2013 to 2015, the farm's restorative justice program allowed teens to earn money to pay off court-ordered restitution and avoid incarceration. Soul Fire Farm's youth program began in 2011.

=== Activist Retreats ===
Soul Fire Farm makes their space available to activists working for social and environmental change so that they might "rejuvenate, strategize, and connect.”

=== Community Farm Days ===
Each Month, from April to October, Soul Fire Farm hosts community farm days, where volunteers and staff work the land and learn together, followed by a potluck and conversation. The farm honors the Haitian cultural practice of Konbit, cooperative work and mutual aid.

== Partner Projects ==
Soul Fire Farm is a partner of the Victory Bus Project, which was created to assist the family members of incarcerated people with the cost of visiting loved ones after state funding for busing families was eliminated. Instead of purchasing a bus fare ticket to the prison for a visit, the family can instead pay for a box of Soul Fire Farm produce with Supplemental Nutrition Assistance Program (SNAP) benefits. They receive the benefit of visiting loved ones and receiving fresh produce. Soul Fire Farm also partners with The Northeast Farmers of Color Network on the Reparations Map for Black-Indigenous Farmers. The aim is to claim sovereignty of the food system that was built on the stolen land and stolen labor of black, Indigenous, Latino, Asian and people of color and calls for reparations of land and resources.

== Known employees ==
- Brooke Bridges (2018–present)
