= David Angel (academic) =

British academic (born 1958)

9th President of Clark University
- In office July 1, 2010 – June 2020
- Preceded by: John Bassett

Personal details
- Born: June 29, 1958 (age 68) East London, England
- Education: University of Cambridge (BS); University of California, Los Angeles (MS, PhD)

David Angel (born June 29, 1958) is a British economic geographer and academic administrator who was the ninth president of Clark University in Worcester, Massachusetts from July 1, 2010, to June 2020.

== Early life and education ==
Angel grew up in East London, England and received his bachelor's degree from the Department of Geography at the University of Cambridge in 1980. He came to the United States to study at University of California, Los Angeles, where he earned his master's degree and Ph.D., working on a study of labor markets in the American semiconductor industry under the advisement of Allen J. Scott.

== Career and research ==
As an economic geographer, Angel has produced work in a variety of subject-related areas including American labor markets for engineers, the global growth of technological research and development and corporate environmental guidelines. Another area of focus was an industrial expansion within East Asia. In their 2007 article, "Grow First, Clean Up Later? Industrial Transformation in East Asia," Angel and fellow author Michael T. Rock report that various national governments had found techniques to balance environmental concerns with the desire for technological advancement that would match that of the west.

Angel joined the faculty of Clark University in 1987 as a professor of geography. Angel became provost and vice president for academic affairs in 2003, responsible for all academic programs at the university. While serving as provost, he developed Clark's Liberal Education and Effective Practice (LEEP) program. Angel stated that the goal of LEEP was to help college students foster success-oriented skillsets and develop a fulfilling life. LEEP was described in a Clark press release as a program that combines partnerships with Clark, university alumni and employers, with professional and personal experiences.

Angel also played a role in the development of the IEIS (Institute for Energy Innovation and Sustainability), co-founding the institute with WPI Provost John Orr. The IEIS was developed with the intention of consolidating clean energy companies in the Worcester area. The institute was founded after initial discussions between WPI, Clark, local government, and energy companies who shared their business needs. Beyond serving as co-founder, Angel also helped lead the search for an executive director for the IEIS. On July 1, 2010, Angel succeeded John Bassett as the university President.

Angel also served as chair of the New England Commission of Higher Education and was credited with continuing Clark's commitment to diversity and inclusion by developing a Presidential Advisory Board on the subject, as well as creating a new role- the Chief Officer of Diversity and Inclusion- and completing a diversity-based survey of the Clark community. In January 2019, Angel announced that he would retire from his position upon the conclusion of his contract in June 2020.

In 1999, Angel was appointed as the editor-in-chief of Economic Geography, a globally recognized research journal. During his tenure in this role, he brought in three additional co-editors from outside of Clark University and diversified knowledge and viewpoints of those participating in the editorial process.

== Major publications ==
- Rock, M.T. and Angel, D. 2005. Industrial Transformation in the Developing World. Oxford: Oxford University Press. ISBN 978-0199270040.
- Angel, D. and M.T. Rock. 2000. Asia's Clean Revolution: Industry, Growth and the Environment. Sheffield: Greenleaf Publishing. ISBN 978-1874719335.
- Brown, H.S., Angel D., and P. Derr. 2000. Effective Environmental Regulation: Learning from Poland's Experience. Westport: Praeger. ISBN 978-0275969714
- Angel D. 1994. Restructuring for Innovation: the remaking of the U.S. semiconductor industry. New York: Guilford Press. ISBN 978-0898622973
- Angel, D.; Rock, Michael. 2007. "Grow First, Clean Up Later? Industrial Transformation in East Asia". Environment. ISSN 0013-9157
