= Clark University =

Private university in Worcester, Massachusetts

- Motto: Fiat lux (Latin)
- Motto in English: "Let there be light" Second motto: "Challenge Convention. Change our World."
- Type: Private research university
- Established: March 31, 1887; 139 years ago
- Founder: Jonas Gilman Clark
- Accreditation: NECHE
- Academic affiliations: NAICU; HECCMA
- Endowment: $522 million (Dec. 2025)
- President: David Fithian
- Faculty: 228 full-time
- Students: 3,559 (fall 2025)
- Undergraduates: 2,203 (fall 2025)
- Postgraduates: 1,356 (fall 2025)
- Location: Worcester, Massachusetts, United States; 42°15′04″N 71°49′24″W
- Campus: 72 acres (29 ha); Midsize City
- Newspaper: The Scarlet
- Colors: Scarlet; White
- Nickname: Cougars
- Sporting affiliations: NCAA Division III – NEWMAC
- Mascot: Jonas
- Website: clarku.edu

Clark University is a private research university in Worcester, Massachusetts, United States. Founded in 1887 with a large endowment from its namesake Jonas Gilman Clark, a prominent businessman, Clark was known as the first all-graduate institution in the U.S. Originally an all-graduate institution, Clark's first undergraduates entered in 1902 and women were first enrolled in 1942.

The university offers 46 majors, minors, and concentrations in the humanities, social sciences, natural sciences, and engineering and allows students to design specialized majors and engage in pre-professional programs. It is a member of the Higher Education Consortium of Central Massachusetts, which enables students to cross-register at other Worcester institutions including the Worcester Polytechnic Institute and the College of the Holy Cross.

After Becker College closed at the end of the 2020–21 academic year, Clark opened the Becker School of Design and Technology, carrying on Becker's game design programs with many of the same faculty.

Clark is classified among "R2: Doctoral Universities – High research activity". It was a founding member of the Association of American Universities, but departed in 1999. The university competes intercollegiately in 17 NCAA Division III varsity sports as the Clark Cougars and is a part of the New England Women's and Men's Athletic Conference. Notable Clark faculty, alumni, and affiliates include inventors of the wind chill factor and the birth control pill, as well as prominent business executives.

== History ==
=== Founding and early history ===
On January 17, 1887, successful American businessman Jonas Gilman Clark announced his intention to found and endow a university in the city of Worcester, filing a petition in the Massachusetts Legislature requesting a charter for Clark University. An Act of Incorporation was duly enacted by the legislature and signed by the governor on March 31 of that same year. Clark University was to incorporate the best features of universities in continental Europe and America, particularly Cornell University and Johns Hopkins.

Clark was a friend of Leland Stanford and was inspired by the plans for Stanford University, as well as Cornell and Johns Hopkins. Clark founded the university with an endowment of one million dollars, and later added another million dollars because he feared the university might someday face a lack of funds. Opening on October 2, 1889, Clark was the first all-graduate university in the United States, with departments in mathematics, physics, chemistry, biology, and psychology.

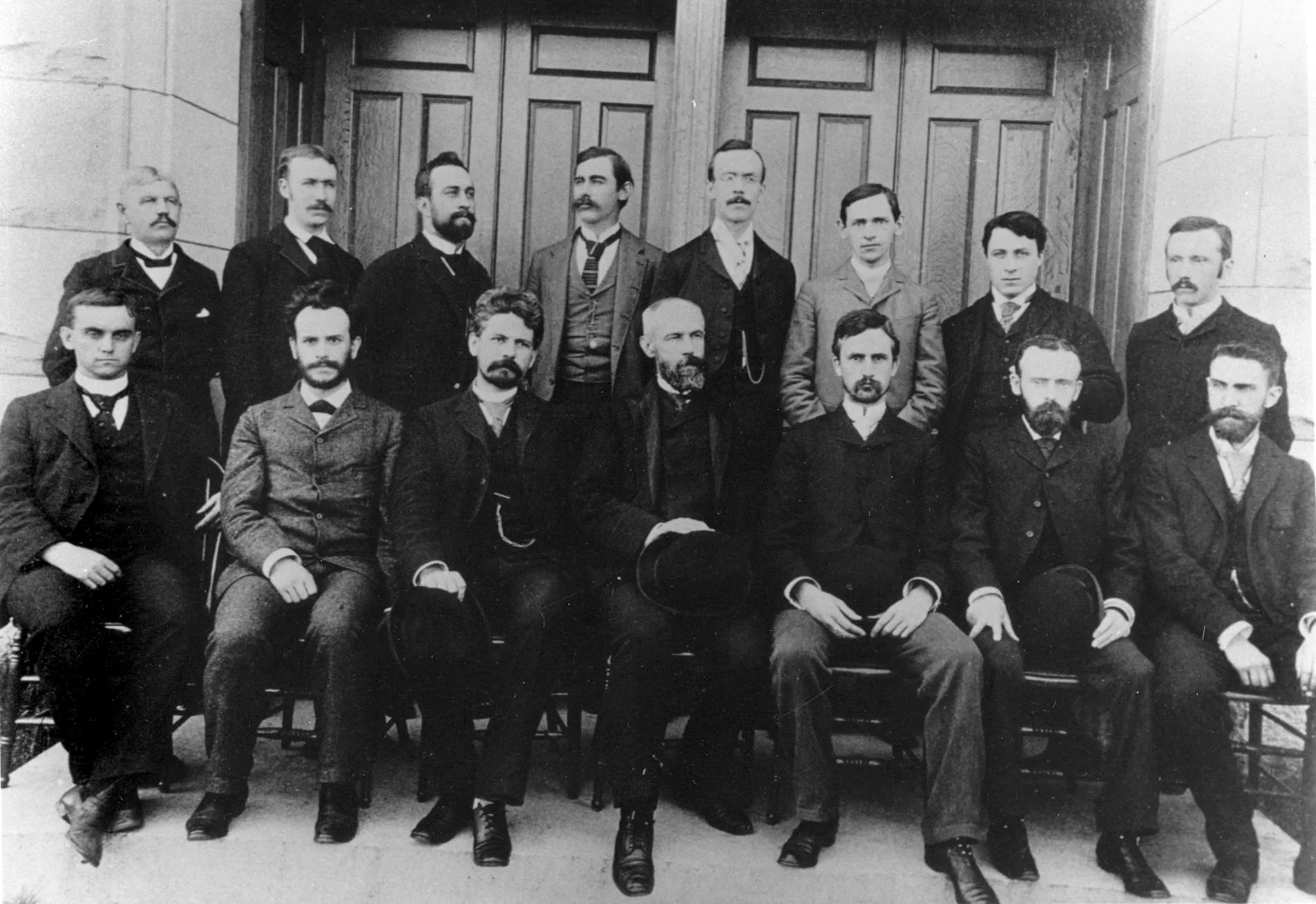
Faculty of the "Psychological" department in 1893 includes Franz Boas (seated, second from left) and president G. Stanley Hall (seated, middle). Edmund Sanford is seated to the right of Hall.

G. Stanley Hall was appointed the first president of Clark University in 1888. He had been a professor of psychology and pedagogy at Johns Hopkins University, which had been founded just a few years prior and was quickly becoming a model of the modern research university. Hall spent seven months in Europe visiting other universities and recruiting faculty. He became the founder of the American Psychological Association and earned the first PhD in psychology in the United States at Harvard. Clark has played a prominent role in the development of psychology as a distinguished discipline in the United States ever since. Franz Boas, founder of American cultural anthropology and adviser for the first PhD in anthropology which was granted at Clark in 1891, taught at Clark from 1888 until 1892 when he resigned in a dispute with President Hall over academic freedom and joined the faculty of Columbia University. Albert A. Michelson, the first American to receive a Nobel Prize in Physics, best known for his involvement in the Michelson–Morley experiment, which measured the speed of light, was a professor from 1889 to 1892 before becoming head of the physics department at the University of Chicago.

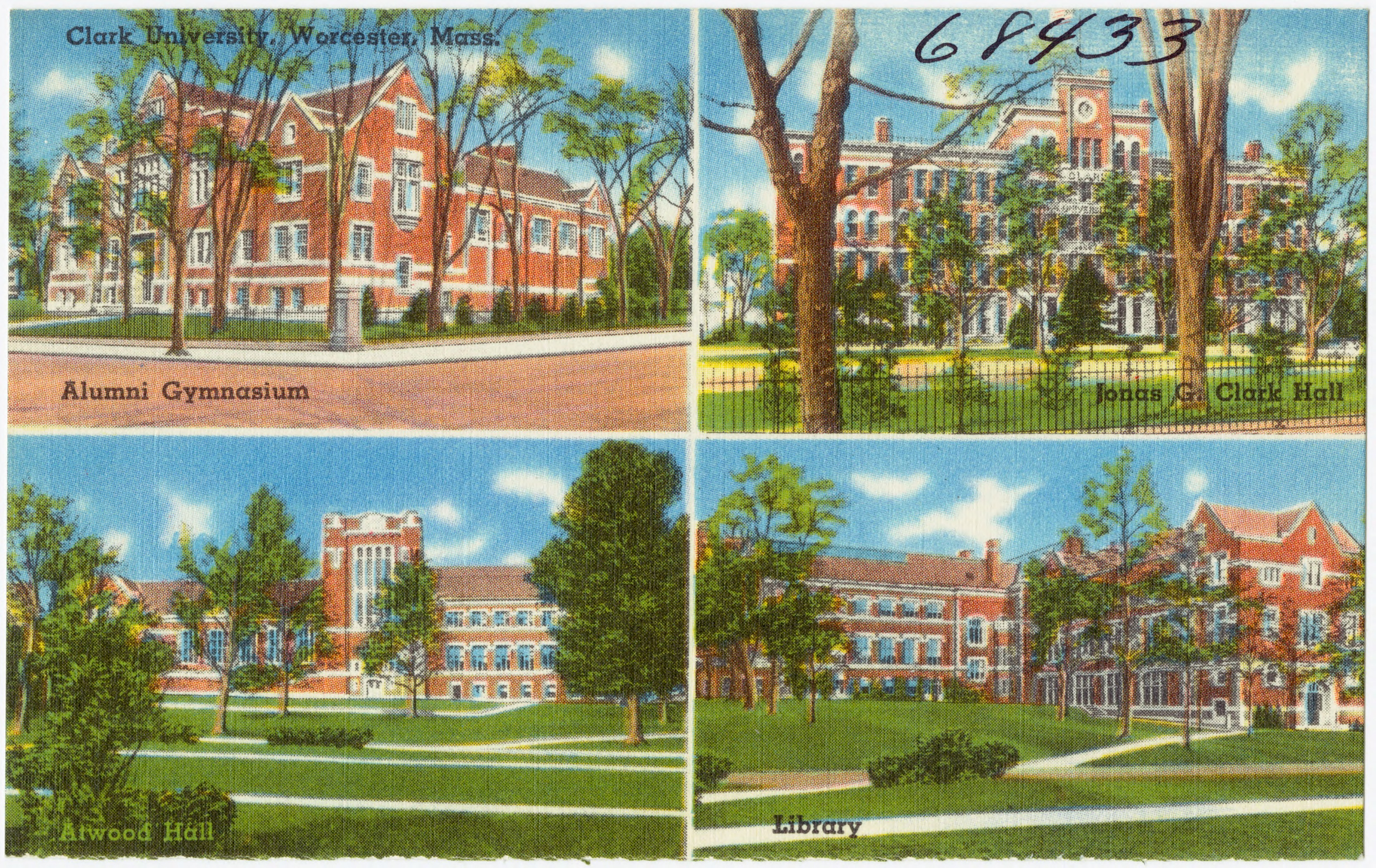
The use of many of these buildings has changed since this postcard was printed around the middle of the 20th century.

Jonas G. Clark died in 1900, leaving gifts to the university and campus library, but reserving half of his estate for the foundation of an undergraduate college. This had been strongly opposed by President Hall in years past, but Clark College opened in 1902, managed independently of Clark University. Clark College and Clark University had different presidents until Hall's retirement in 1920. Clark University began admitting women after Clark's death, and the first female PhD in psychology was awarded in 1908. Early PhD students in psychology were ethnically diverse, with several early graduates being Japanese. In 1920, Francis Sumner became the first African American to earn a PhD in psychology.

In 1900, Clark University was one of the fourteen founding members of the Association of American Universities, an organization of universities with the most prestigious profiles in research and graduate education, alongside two other New England universities, Harvard and Yale. Clark withdrew its membership in 1999, citing changes to its mission.

=== Clark Lectures ===
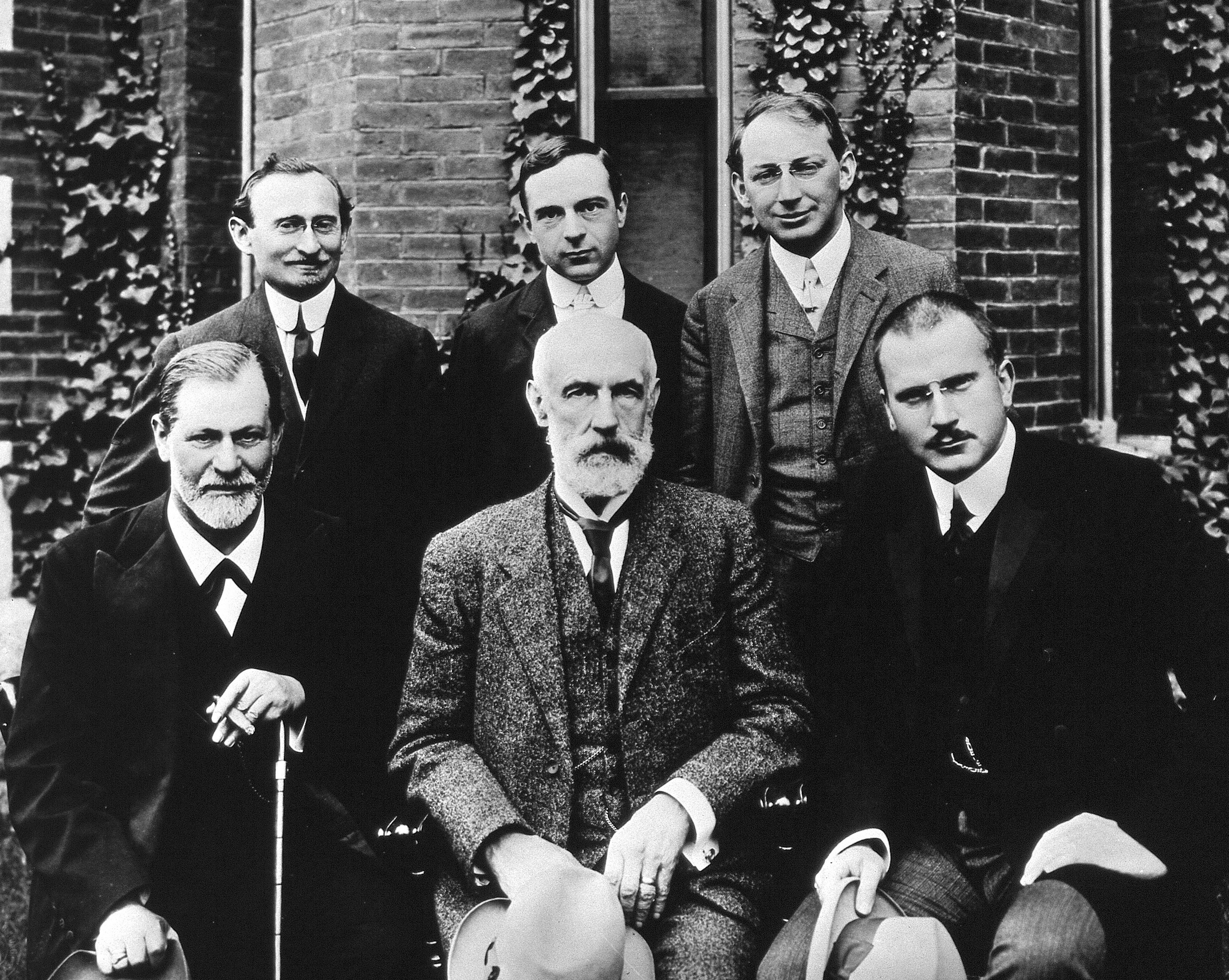
Group photo 1909 in front of Clark University. Front row: Sigmund Freud, G. Stanley Hall, Carl Jung; back row: Abraham A. Brill, Ernest Jones, Sándor Ferenczi.

In 1909, as a celebration of Clark's 20th anniversary as an institution, President Hall invited a number of leading thinkers to the university. Among them was Sigmund Freud who, accompanied by Carl Jung, delivered his five lectures on themes such as trauma and sexual repression. The ideas that Freud presented at Clark were criticized in the U.S and his visit to Clark was Freud's only visit to the United States. with skeptical beliefs, such as those of Hall, who believed that Freud's theory of psychoanalysis could impact the human moral compass. Clark granted Freud an honorary degree, which hangs in the Sigmund Freud House in Vienna, Austria. It was one of the few official distinctions Freud received during his lifetime.

=== Later history ===
In the 1920s Robert Goddard, a pioneer of rocketry, considered one of the founders of space and missile technology, was chairman of the Physics Department. The Robert H. Goddard Library is named for him.

The Graduate School of Management (GSOM) was founded in 1982. In 1997, Clark announced the first PhD program in Holocaust Studies in the United States. This after the university convinced Debórah Dwork to leave Yale University and become Clark's first professor of Holocaust studies in the prior year.

=== 2000s ===
The Mosakowski Institute for Public Enterprise was established in fall 2007 due to a founding gift from two Clark alumni, William '76 and Jane '75 Mosakowski.

In March 2009, Clark University convened a first-of-its-kind National Conference on Liberal Education and Effective Practice, co-sponsored by Clark's Mosakowski Institute for Public Enterprise and the Association of American Colleges and Universities.

In April 2009, then-President John Bassett denied Clark University Students for Palestinian Rights, a student group, permission to bring Norman Finkelstein to speak about the "Gaza Massacre" (2008–2009 Gaza War) because Finkelstein "would invite controversy and not dialogue or understanding". He also cited a conflict in scheduling regarding a conference on Holocaust and Genocide Studies presented by the university in the same month. However, following protests, which included a public protest in the center of campus, a petition campaign and outreach by alumni, students and faculty, Basset reversed his decision and allowed Finkelstein to speak on April 27, the last day of classes for the semester. Finkelstein spoke to around 400 students, faculty and community members in Atwood Hall.

In April 2010, Clark University received the largest gift in its 123-year history, a $14.2 million offering from the late head of Hanover Insurance, one of the nation's biggest property and casualty insurers. The gift from John Adam is intended to strengthen Clark's graduate programs in education, promote college-readiness among minority students and bolster its research profile related to urban education. This donation created the Adams Education Fund, which will enhance Clark's nationally recognized model for urban secondary education and reform, teacher-training, and community education partnerships.

On July 1, 2010, former provost David Angel became the ninth president of Clark, succeeding John Bassett, who went on to become president of Heritage University, located on the Yakama Indian Reservation in Toppenish, Washington.

In summer 2012, Clark University underwent more renovations. The city of Worcester allowed the university to close Downing Street to unite the campus. The area was landscaped to become a pedestrian plaza. Johnson and Sanford halls were united to become the Johnson Sanford Center featuring new social, study, and multimedia spaces. The project included addition of an outdoor roof terrace and an elevator to all levels. The university has recently begun a project called LEEP to connect students and the world of academia to practical experience.

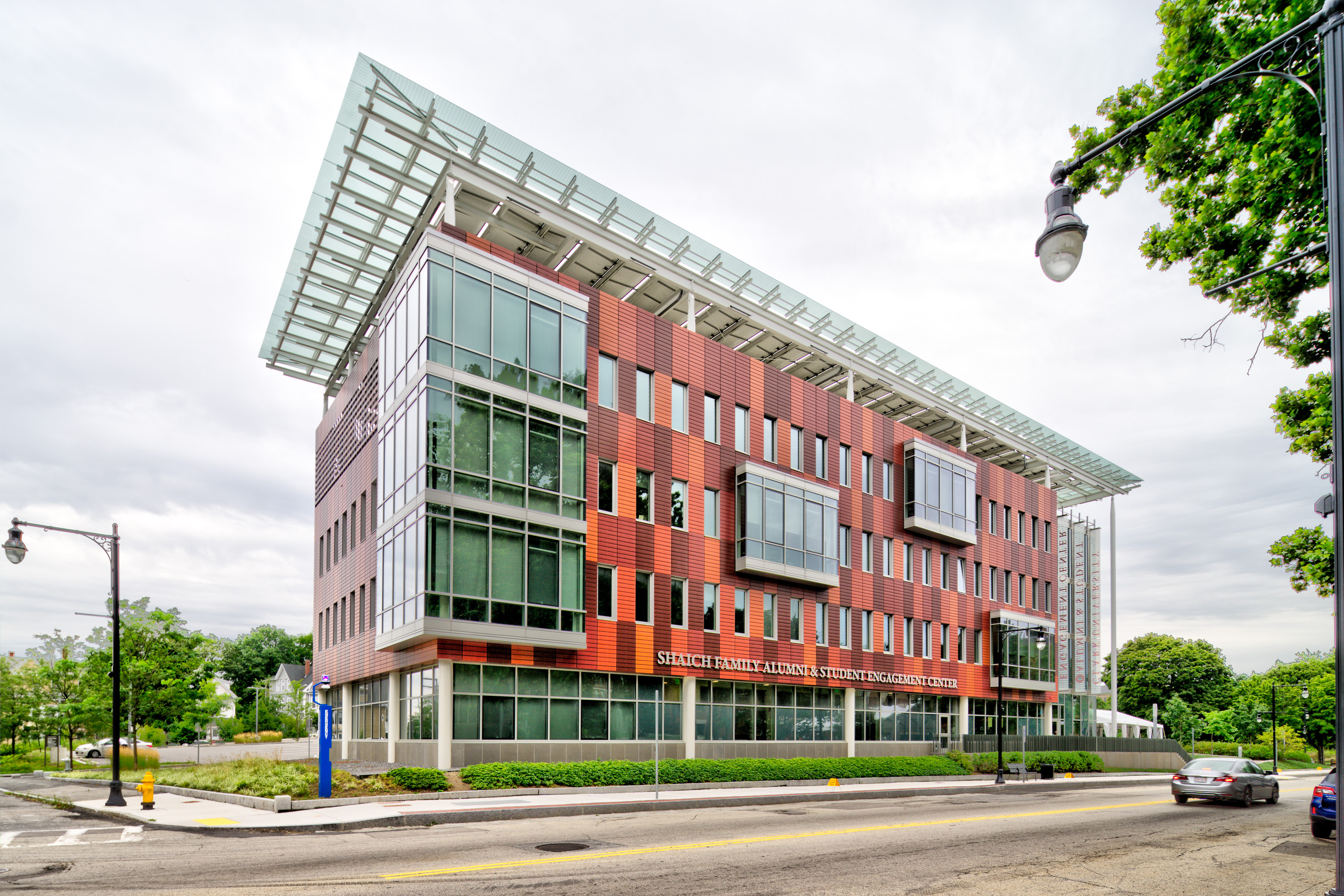
Alumni and Student Engagement Center

Summer 2016 saw the completion of a new Alumni and Student Engagement Center building, extending the campus across Main Street. The facility is a mixed-use building containing administrative offices, lecture halls, meeting rooms, and some retail space, and features a modern architectural look and a rooftop solar array.

On July 1, 2020, David Fithian '87 became the tenth president of Clark, succeeding David Angel, who retired. Fithian is the first alumnus to serve as president. He was previously executive vice president of the University of Chicago and, before that, associate dean of the Faculty of Arts and Sciences at Harvard University.

In 2022, graduate students at the university organized as Clark University Graduate Workers United, a chapter of Teamsters Local 170. An NLRB-overseen election resulted in a 100–7 vote in favor of unionization, after which the union and university entered into negotiations. On October 3, 2022, the graduate workers' union began an indefinite strike over wages, benefits, and working conditions that continued until that Friday, October 7, when the union and the university announced a tentative agreement on a contract. On the following Wednesday, October 13, the union unanimously ratified the contract, which took effect immediately. The contract expired on September 1, 2025, and CUGWU held a strike authorization vote on September 2, 2025.

In 2024, undergraduate student workers at Clark also began a campaign to unionize with Teamsters Local 170. The group publicly announced their intent to unionize through an Instagram post on January 17, 2025. and Teamsters Local 170 filed for an election on their behalf with the NLRB on February 14, 2025. The proposed unit included all undergraduate student workers and graduate workers not covered under the existing contract, a total of 620 employees. However, Teamsters Local 170 withdrew their election petition on February 28, 2025, citing concerns about Clark's stated intent to challenge the NLRB's Columbia 2016 decision, which protects the right of student workers at private universities to unionize. On March 5, Clark University Undergraduate Workers United and Teamsters Local 170 called for the university to sign a card check neutrality agreement, which would allow the group to unionize without a formal NLRB election. On March 13, 2025, the group began an indefinite strike for card check neutrality that continued until March 23, 2025, when Clark University Undergraduate Workers United organizers released a statement announcing their decision to end the strike but continuing to call for card check neutrality.

In response to growing concerns over the budget and enrollment trends, Clark announced its plans to cut faculty positions by 30% from 2025 to 2028 as part of a larger restructuring of the university, which also includes programming cuts. Citing financial sustainability and improvement of job prospects as objectives, interim provost John Magee led the elimination of programs in ancient civilization, French and francophone studies, comparative literature, and a major in studio art, as well as the pausing or restructuring of multiple graduate courses. Student critics linked the cuts to the university's prioritization of the recently opened Becker School of Design and Technology's video game programs.

== Campus ==
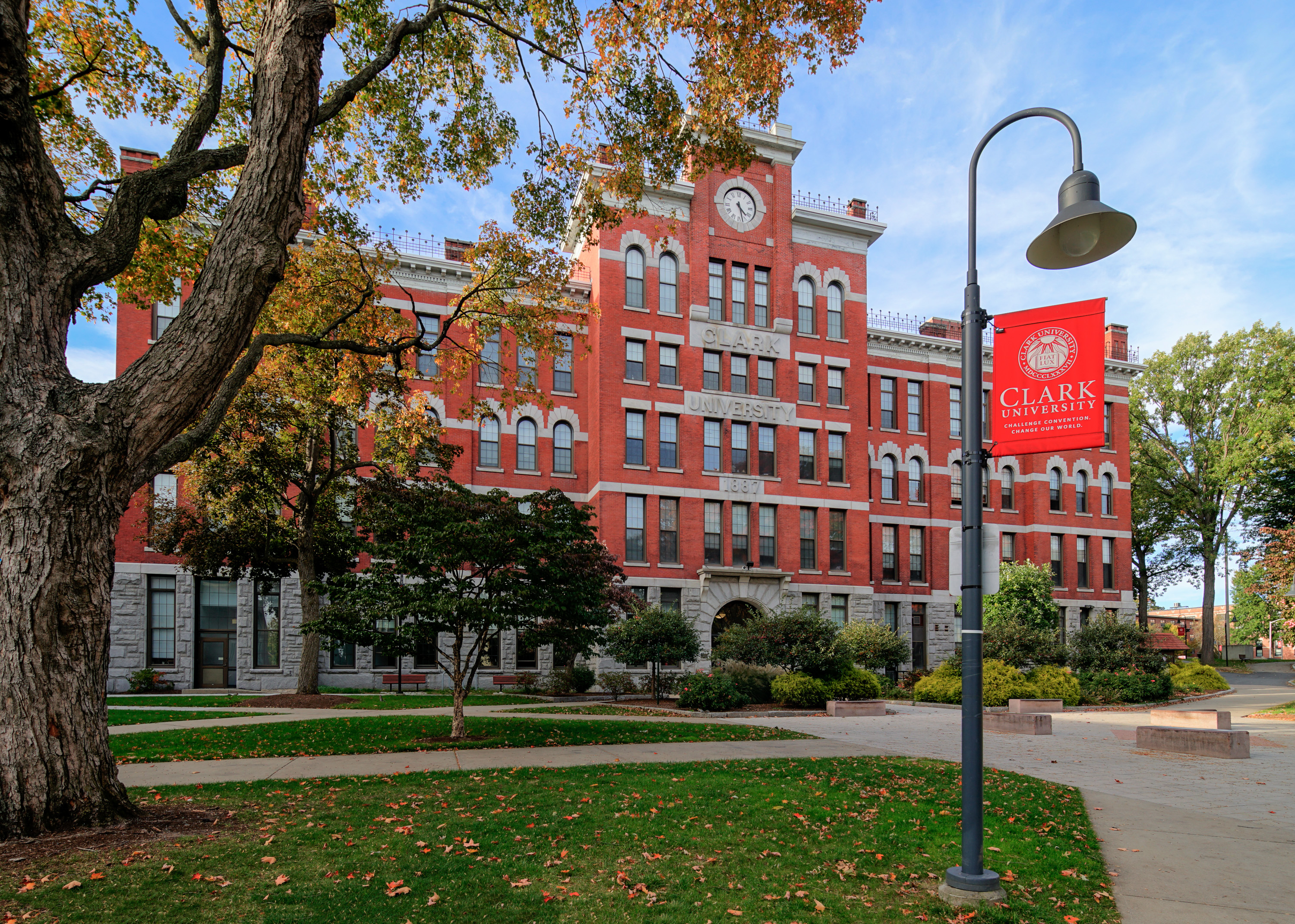
Jonas Clark Hall, the main academic facility for undergraduate students

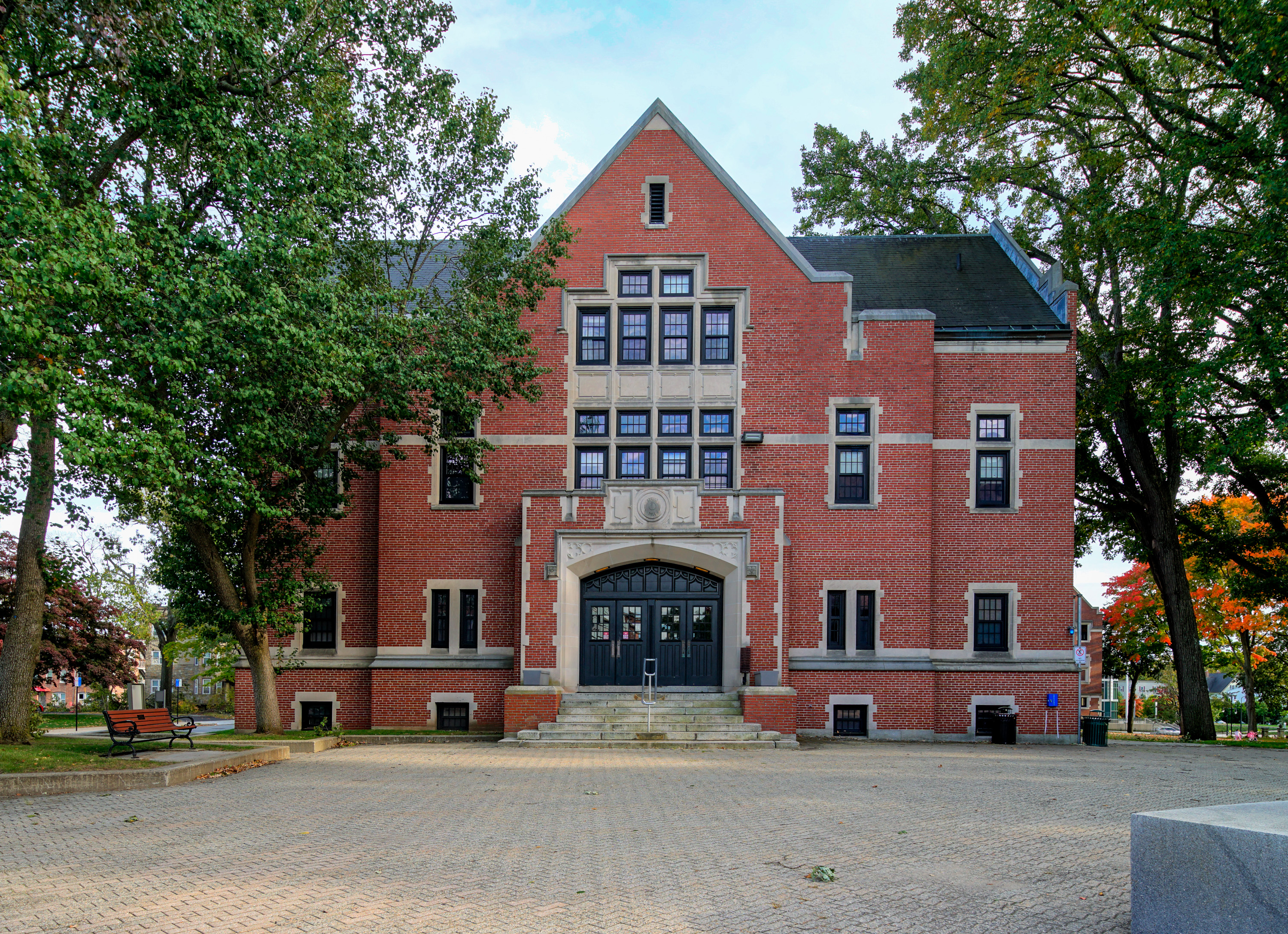
Atwood Hall, the largest lecture hall on campus

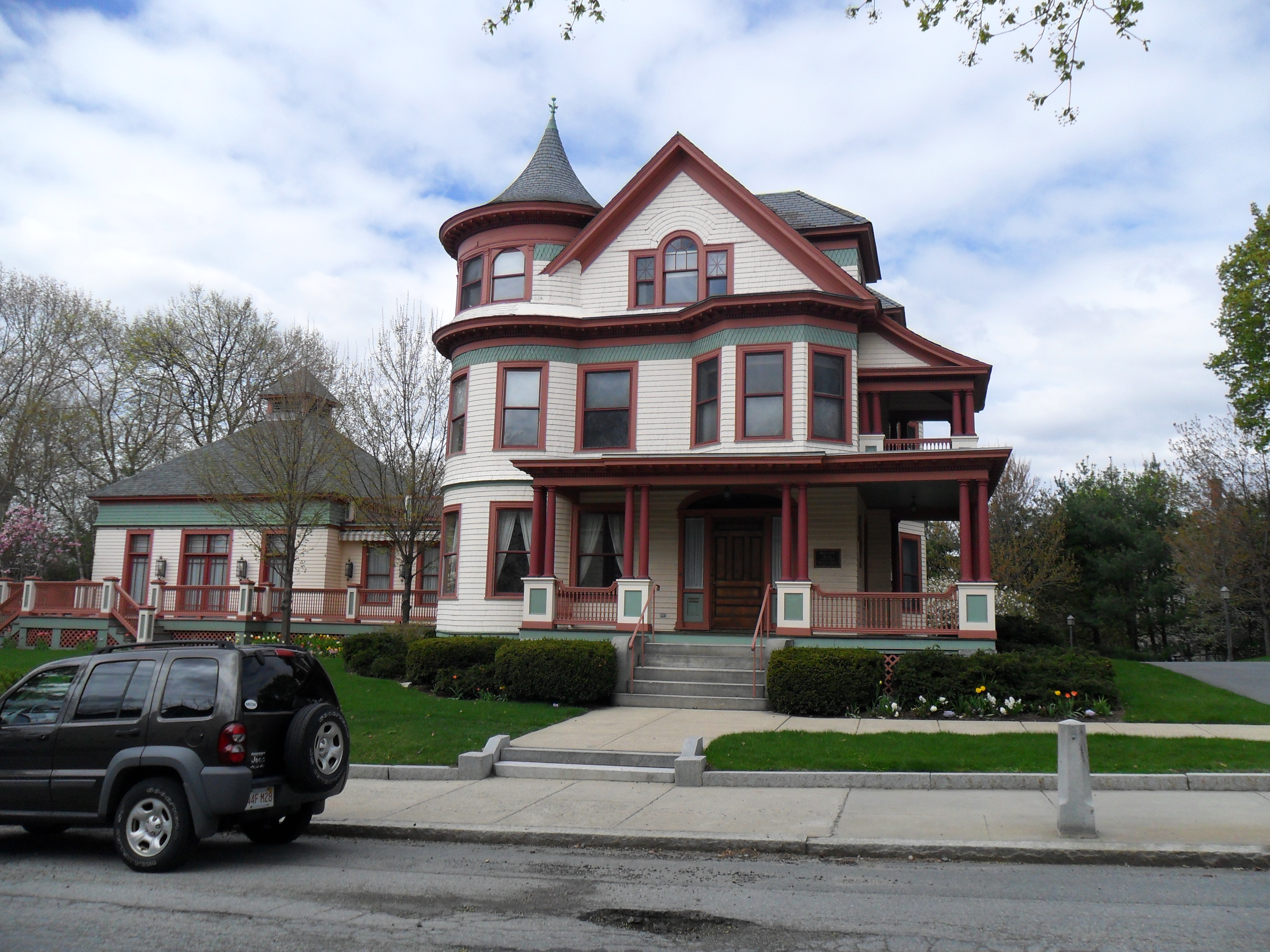
Harrington House, the home of Clark presidents

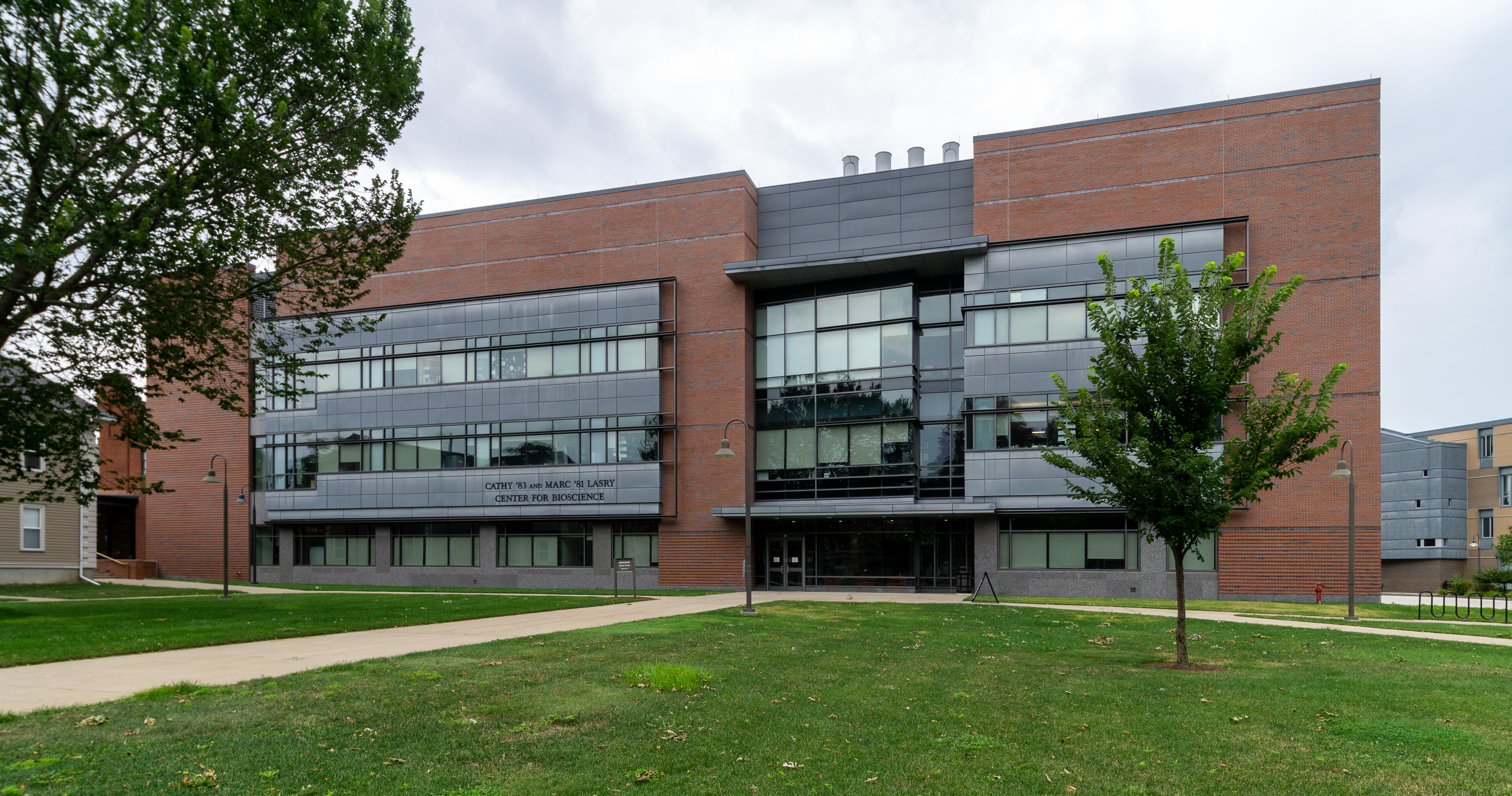
Lasry Center for Bioscience

The campus is located on Main Street in the Main South neighborhood about 2 miles (3.2 km) west of downtown Worcester and 40 miles (64 km) west of Boston. The campus is compact, with most of the major buildings located within the space of a single city block.

The center of campus is known as the Green. The Green is a hub for student activity, and is where most Clarkies spend their time during the warm months. It is the location of Spree Day, the welcome back BBQ, several clubs' events and graduation. The buildings surrounding The Green include Atwood Hall, Jefferson Academic Center, Higgins University Center, Jonas Clark Hall, and the Goddard Library.

Administrative offices are housed in small buildings along Woodland Street, as is the president's house. The new Shaich Family Alumni and Student Engagement Center, named in honor of a $5 million gift from the family of alumnus Ron Shaich, is across Main Street and houses meeting spaces and offices.

=== Academic facilities ===
Jonas Clark Hall, built in 1887, was Clark University's first building. It occupies the center of campus and houses the economics, psychology and education departments. Located in the basement of Jonas Clark Hall is the university's cogeneration plant which allows the university to recycle waste heat from electrical generation into hot water, heat, and steam. It was updated in 2013 to a more efficient 2.0 kWh natural gas engine.

Estabrook Hall, located on Woodland Street, is the second oldest building on Clark's campus. Originally constructed as a dormitory, it now functions as the language center and the music center. The upper floors are primarily home to classrooms and offices for the Language, Literature, and Culture department, which includes Spanish, French, German, Latin, and Hebrew. The bottom floor and basement are practice rooms and music halls.

The Jefferson Academic Center houses various social science departments including Women's Studies, Geography, History, Geographical Information Sciences, Political Science, and Sociology.

Atwood Hall, attached to the Jefferson Academic Center, is the primary theater on campus and seats 658. Atwood Hall originally served as the chapel for the university, and in recent decades has been the scene for several notable concerts and speeches. The Grateful Dead (1967 and 1969), the Jimi Hendrix Experience (1968), Janis Joplin (1969), and Bruce Springsteen and the E Street Band (1974) have all played here. A March 15, 1968 concert by the Jimi Hendrix Experience was professionally recorded and released in 1999 as Live at Clark University. In 1963, student D'Army Bailey invited Malcolm X to speak here. Noam Chomsky spoke here on the topic of the Israeli–Palestinian conflict and the Arab Spring April 12, 2011. It was the first-ever lecture given on a Spree Day at Clark. On October 16, 2014, President Bill Clinton spoke in Atwood as a supporter of Martha Coakley's run for Governor of Massachusetts. In 2026, Clark released a documentary film, Echoes of Atwood Hall, showcasing the history of music legends who played there and the role of the students who invited them.

The Lasry Center for Bioscience (named for hedge fund manager Marc Lasry and his wife Cathy, both alumni) houses the biology department. It received a LEED Gold certification for its energy efficiency.

The Little Center is the alternate performing arts venue, with its largest room, the Michelson Theater seating 120.

The Academic Commons, also known as the AC, acts as a study area and lounge for the students, and incorporates a Sodexo coffeehouse named Jazzmans, a quiet study area, a computer room, and the Mosakowski Institute for Public Enterprises. The Goddard Library is upstairs from the Academic Commons and houses more than 375,000 volumes.

In fall 2023, Clark opened its newest academic building, the Center for Media Arts, Computing, and Design located at 7 Hawthorne Street. The 70,000 square foot facility was designed by Ayers Saint Gross and is home to the Becker School of Design and Technology, the Department of Computer Science, and programs within the Department of Visual and Performing Arts. The center hosts an AR/VR lab, multimedia gallery, makerspace, robotics lab, active learning classroom, flexible classroom space, and more. It received a LEED Gold certification for its energy efficiency and is the first building on campus to use geothermal wells for heating and cooling.

=== Libraries ===
Libraries

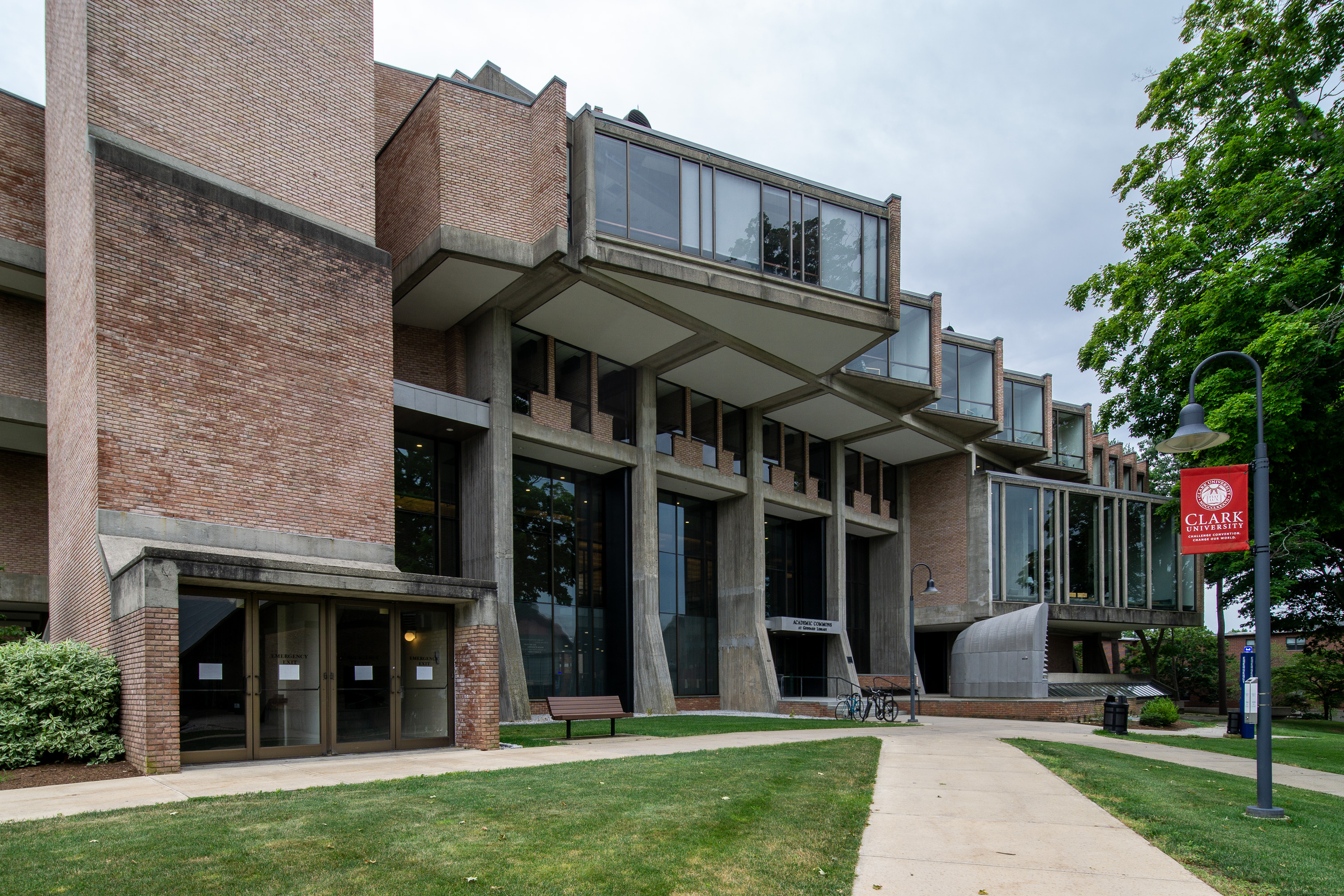
Robert H. Goddard Library

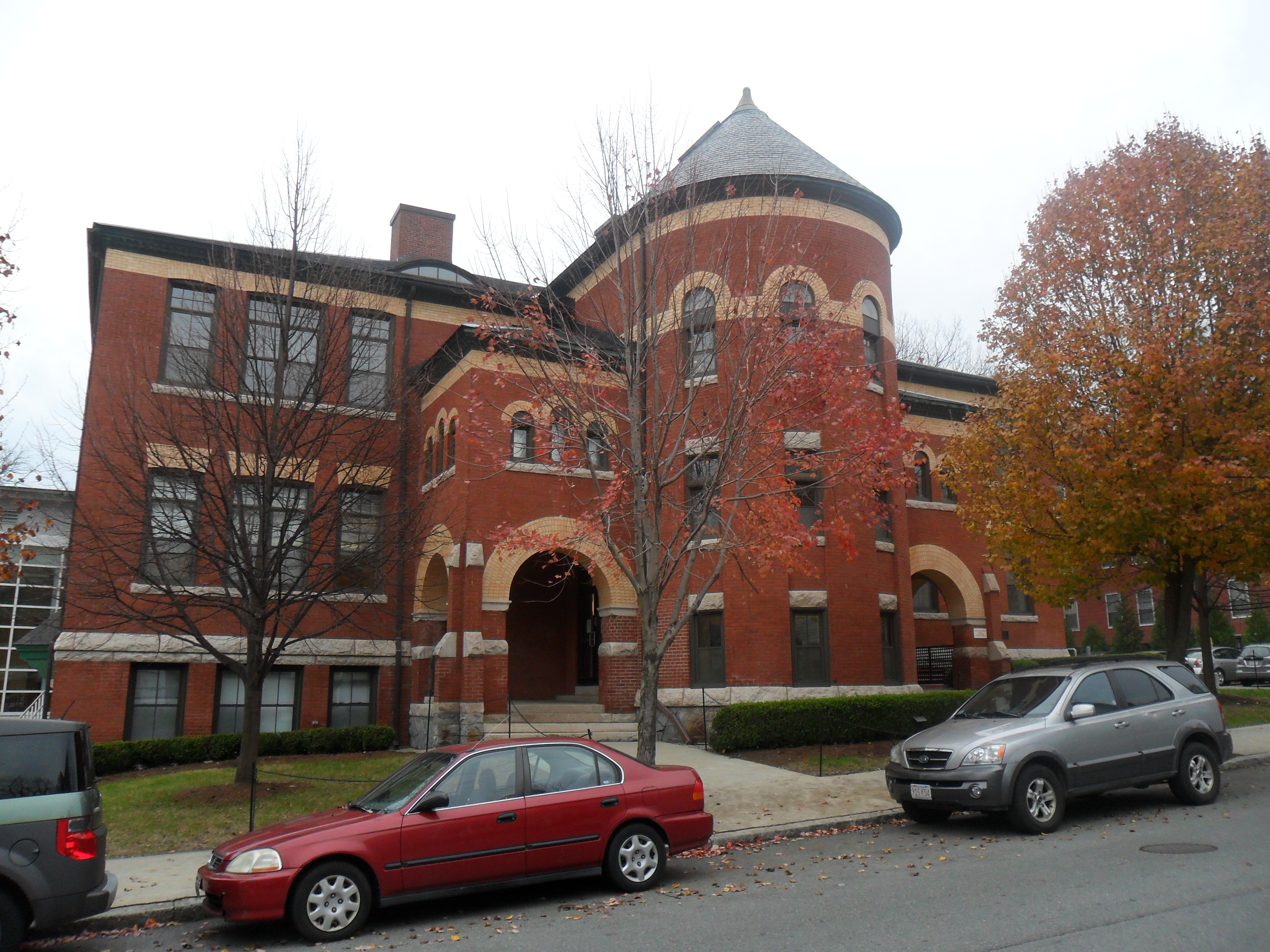
Traina Center for the Arts, located in the former Downing Street School

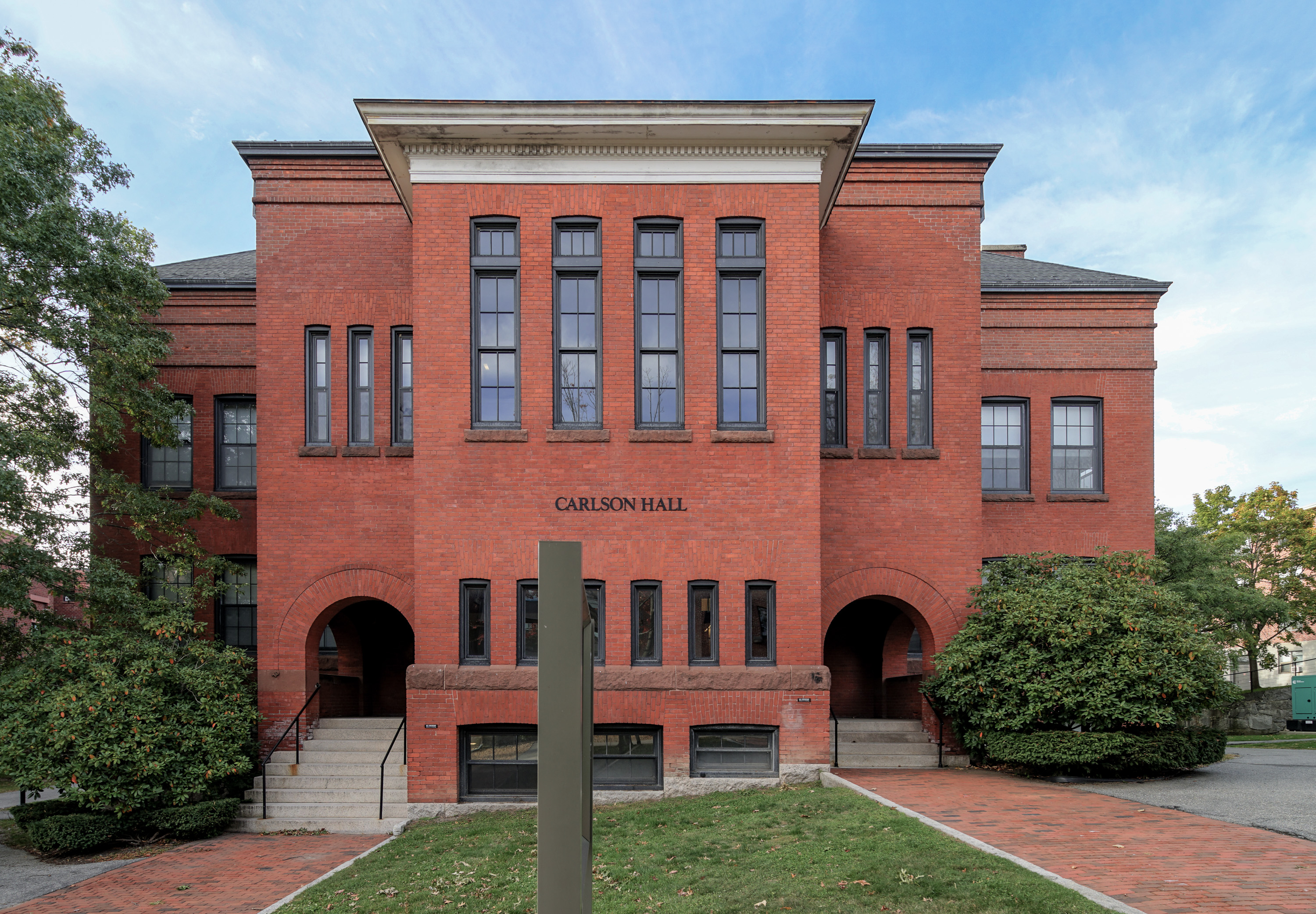
Carlson Hall

Clark University has four libraries.

- The Goddard Library, the main library of the university
- The Rose Library at the Strassler Center for Holocaust and Genocide Studies, which contains volumes concerning genocides
- The Jeanne X. Kasperson Research Library, which focuses on environmental research
- The Fuller Resource Library at the Traina Center for the Arts, with performing arts media in its collection

=== Athletic facilities ===
The Kneller Athletic Center houses the basketball courts, swimming pool, racquet ball courts, handball courts, and the James and Ada B. Bickman Fitness Center which was opened in 1995 and completely renovated in 2013. Major campus events, such as International Gala, the fall concert, and first year orientation are usually held in the Kneller as the basketball courts are the largest rooms on campus and can accommodate the entire student body. The Thomas M. '62 and Joan E. '60 Dolan Field House opened in May 2003 at which time the Russ Granger Athletic Fields and Corash Tennis Courts around it were reconfigured and renovated. The Boys and Girls Club Track and Field opened in October 2016.

=== Housing ===
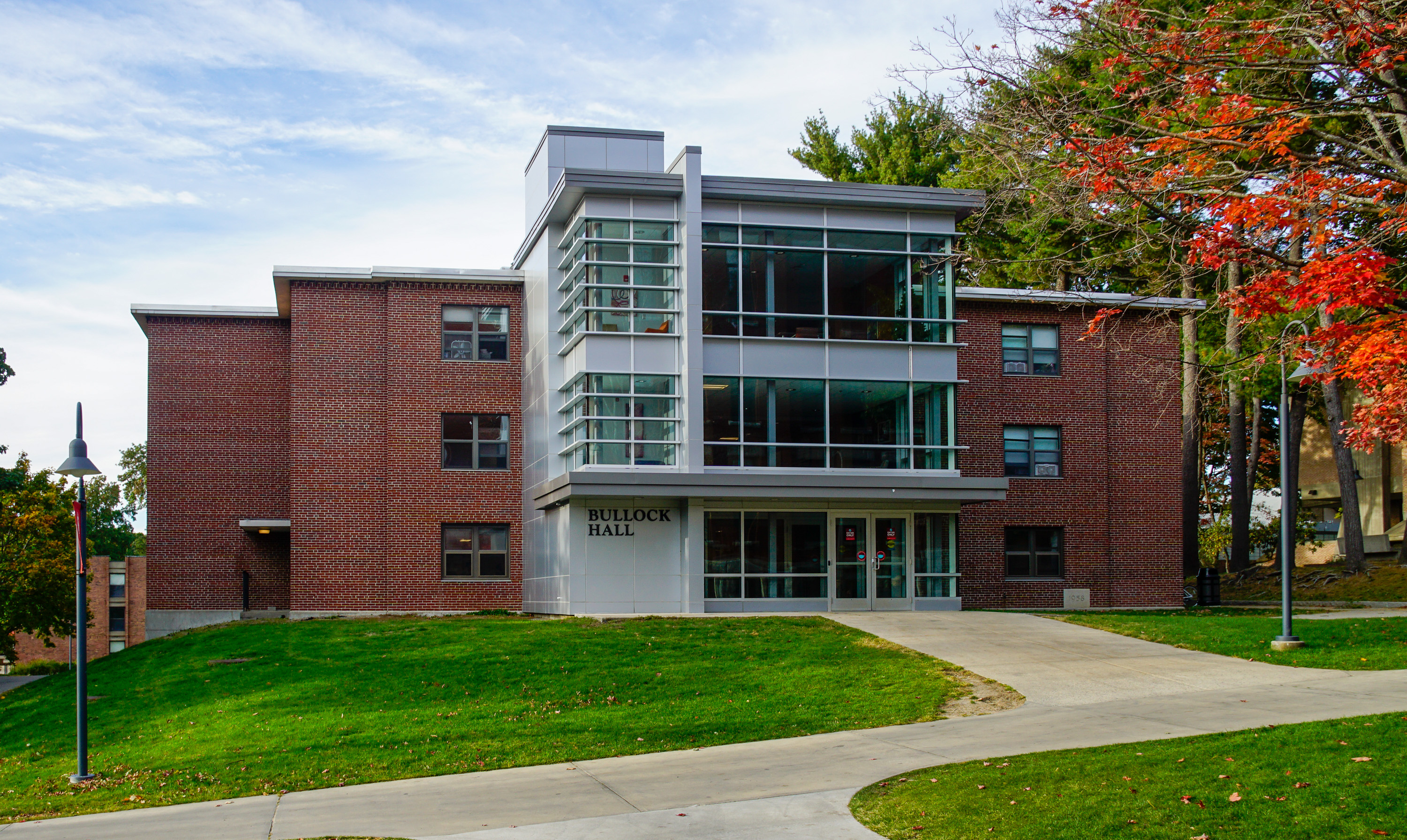
Bullock Hall

Students entering Clark must live on campus for the first two years unless their primary address is within 25 miles (40 km) of campus. The residence halls at Clark are organized by those who live there:

- First Year Experience halls (Dana, Hughes, Bullock, and Wright)
- Mixed class halls (Johnson-Sanford Center)
- Single sex hall (Dodd—female and non-binary only)
- Suite-style and apartment-style halls (Maywood and Blackstone)

Clark owns apartments that, while outside of the main campus area, exclusively house Clark students.

The first Clark "residence halls" (Wright and Bullock) opened in 1959. Before that time, Estabrook Hall was the men's dormitory and small women's dorms stood in the current location of Little Center and Bullock Hall. Blackstone, the newest of the halls, opened in 2007.

As of fall 2007, gender blind/neutral housing is an option at Clark, meaning that students of different genders can room together.

Clark University released its Climate Action Plan December 15, 2009, detailing strategies for the university to reduce its carbon footprint while strengthening many of its existing sustainability practices. The plan sets two goals with respect to climate neutrality: First is an interim goal of reducing emissions to 20 percent below 2005-levels by 2015. The second goal is to achieve climate neutrality (net zero greenhouse gas emissions) by the year 2030.

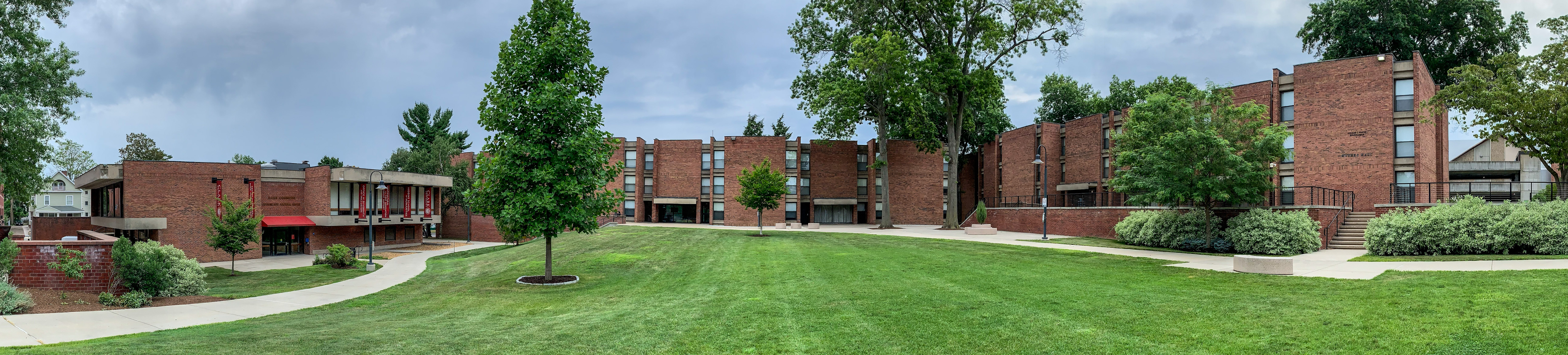
Clark residence halls (left to right): Dana Commons, Dana Residence Hall, Hughes Residence Hall

== Organization ==
=== Clark College ===
Clark College opened in 1902 as the fulfillment of founder Jonas Clark's desire for an undergraduate liberal arts college. The administration of Clark College and Clark University was formally united in 1920 and undergraduate programs continue today under the university.

=== School of Business ===
The School of Business (founded as the Graduate School of Management in 1982) offers master's degrees as well as undergraduate courses in management, marketing, and innovation and entrepreneurship. Notable alumni of the school include Libérat Mfumukeko, secretary-general of the East African Community, and Matt Goldman, co-founder of the Blue Man Group.

=== Graduate School of Geography ===
The Graduate School of Geography (GSG), founded in 1921 by Wallace Walter Atwood, offers bachelor's, master's, and doctoral degrees. Under GSG is Clark Labs, founded in 1987, which developed the IDRISI GIS and image processing software and then the TerrSet geospatial monitoring and modeling software. Alumni of the school include Paul Siple, an Antarctic explorer and inventor of the wind chill factor who attended the school on the recommendation of Admiral Richard E. Byrd. Siple named the Clark Mountains in Antarctica after Clark, and several of the peaks after Clark professors in the GSG.

=== School of Professional Studies ===
The School of Professional Studies (SPS) offers bachelor's degrees as well as a Master in Public Administration (MPA), Master of Science in Public Communication (MSPC), Master of Science in Information Technology (MSIT), Certificate in Community Human Services, and Certificate of Advanced Graduate Study (CAGS). It was the Evening College from its establishment in 1953 and then the College of Professional and Continuing Education (COPACE) from 1975 to 2016. It has branch campuses in Łódź and Warsaw, Poland, with the University of Social Sciences and in Astrakhan, Russia with Astrakhan State University. There are also joint programs with Shandong University of Science and Technology and Hefei University of Technology. Alumni of SPS include Olta Xhaçka, Albanian Minister of Defense, and Keith R. Hall, former director of the National Reconnaissance Office.

=== The Psychology Department/Frances L. Hiatt School of Psychology ===
The Hiatt School of Psychology offers undergraduate and doctoral degrees. Known affiliates of the psychology department include alumnus Francis Sumner, the father of black psychology and the first black Ph.D graduate in psychology. Another alumnus was Arnold Gesell, the child psychologist who used film to study child development. The American Psychological Association was founded at Clark in 1892 by Clark's first president, psychologist G. Stanley Hall. It was also at Clark that mazes were first used to study laboratory rat behavior by Willard Small and Linus Kline. Their idea took influence from Edmund Sanford, their adviser who was also a psychology professor and head of the psychology department at Clark. Psychology professor Heinz Werner was another influential figure. Werner was responsible for the addition of clinical psychology studies, the reinstatement of Clark's psychology Ph.D program, and the further development of the department's ties to the Worcester community. The psychology department was also the birthplace of Clark's Institute for Human Development that was founded in 1957.

=== Gustaf H. Carlson School of Chemistry and Biochemistry ===
The Carlson School of Chemistry offers undergraduate, master's, and doctoral degrees, including a 3/2 engineering program with Columbia University's Fu Foundation School of Engineering and Applied Science. What was then known as Clark's chemical laboratories was once directed by professor Charles A. Kraus, a noted chemist who was a consultant to the U.S. Chemical Warfare Service during World War I and the Manhattan Project during World War II. He also developed the anti-knock additive in gasoline.

=== Becker School of Design & Technology ===
Becker School of Design & Technology was founded in March 2021 after Becker College announced its closure at the end of the Spring 2021 semester. Becker School of Design & Technology offers a bachelor's degree in interactive media with multiple concentrations as well as a Design Your Own undergraduate major. A graduate MFA in interactive media is also offered. As of 2025, Clark University has been ranked #3 by The Princeton Review in the Top 50 Game Design 2025 undergraduate programs and #5 in the Top 25 Game Design 2025 graduate programs.

=== School of Climate, Environment, and Society ===
In September 2025, Clark launched a new interdisciplinary school comprising the Graduate School of Geography, the Department of Sustainability and Social Justice, the Department of Economics, the Center of Geospatial Analytics, and the George Perkins Marsh Institute. In the same year, it appointed Louis Leonard as the inaugural D.J.A. Spencer Dean of the School. Leonard had previously served as dean of the Falk School of Sustainability and Environment at Chatham University in Pennsylvania.

== Academics ==
Clark offers 32 undergraduate and 34 graduate majors. It offers 57 study abroad and away programs in 34 countries. Its most popular undergraduate majors, based on 2021 graduates, were Psychology (85), Economics (48), Political Science and Government (47), Business Administration and Management (43), and Biology/Biological Sciences (37).

As of 2019, Clark had 212 full-time faculty, representing a 10:1 student-faculty ratio. Ninety-four percent of Clark's faculty had doctoral or terminal degrees. Clark University is accredited by the New England Commission of Higher Education.

In recent years, Clark has received widespread media coverage for its "Fifth-Year Free" program. Under Clark's BA/MA program with the fifth year free, undergraduates who maintain a B+ average are eligible for tuition-free enrollment in its one-year graduate programs, meaning that they can get a Master of Arts degree for the price of a bachelor's degree. Students apply to master's degree programs in their junior year, begin meeting requirements in their senior year and typically complete those requirements in the fifth year. Bachelor's degrees are granted en route to the master's degree.

=== Undergraduate admissions ===
For fall 2023, Clark received 10,735 freshmen applications; 4,498 were admitted (41.9%). The average high school GPA of the enrolled freshmen was 3.68, while the middle 50% range of SAT scores was 1300–1440. The middle 50% range of the ACT Composite score was 29–33.

== Rankings and recognition ==
Academic rankings

National
- Forbes: 257
- U.S. News & World Report: 132
- Washington Monthly: 164
- WSJ/College Pulse: 203

Global
- QS: 1001-1200
- THE: 401-500

2022-2023 USNWR Other National Rankings
Top Performers on Social Mobility	98
Best Value School	42
Best Undergraduate Teaching (tie)	41
Computer Science	17
Best Undergraduate Research/Creative Projects (tie)	53

Business school rankings

United States
- QS MBA: 91
- USNWR MBA: 106

Global
- QS MBA: 251

2022 USNWR graduate school rankings
Program	Ranking
Clinical Psychology	80
Psychology (tie)	97
Business	106
Economics (tie)	120
History (tie)	134
Physics (tie)	141
Biological Sciences (tie)	186
Public Affairs	200
Part-time MBA	261

Undergraduate admission to Clark is rated "more selective" by U.S. News & World Report.

Clark University was featured on Princeton Review's 2021 list of best value colleges in the United States and in 2020 it was ranked No.3 of the Top 20 Best Schools for Making an Impact in the United States.

== Student life ==
Student body composition as of April 16, 2023
Race and ethnicity	Total
White	62%
Hispanic	10%
Foreign national	9%
Asian	7%
Black	5%
Other (Note: Other consists of multiracial Americans & those who prefer to not say.)	7%
Economic diversity
Low-income (Note: The percentage of students who received an income-based federal Pell grant intended for low-income students.)	35%
Affluent (Note: The percentage of students who are a part of the American middle class at the bare minimum.)	65%

=== Student body ===
As of fall 2019, Clark's student body comprised 2,349 undergraduates and 1,149 graduate and professional students. International students make up 11.5% of undergraduates. In addition, 21% of the undergraduate student body is classified as ALANA (Asian-, Latino-, African-, and Native-American) and 61% of undergraduates are female.

=== Residential life ===
The majority of the undergraduate student body, 66%, lives on campus. Clark requires undergraduates to do so for their first two years, with first-years being assigned housing based on their responses to a Housing Preferences Form. Once first-years have been assigned housing, a seniority system, whereby seniors have the first choice of spaces left, juniors have the second, and sophomores the third, ensures that seniors and juniors are usually able to live on campus if they wish to. Nonetheless, some choose to live in off-campus apartments in the immediate neighborhood of Clark, along with the graduate students outside the 1% that live on campus.

=== Student organizations ===
There are more than 130 student clubs and organizations at Clark. All these are headed by the Clark Undergraduate Student Council which disseminates more than $750,000 in budgets to the various clubs and their events.

==== Media and publications ====
The Scarlet is Clark University's student newspaper. It is published weekly and has four sections: News, Opinions, Living Arts, and Sports. Clark's literary magazine, Caesura, is published annually and features artwork, poetry, prose, essays, and creative non-fiction submitted by undergraduate and graduate students. STIR Magazine, Clark's life, culture, and style magazine, was founded by Diana Levine as a student project in 2004. STIR began with a three-person staff and in black and white, and now has about 30 core students who contribute to its production in full color. The Scholarly Undergraduate Research Journal (SURJ) is Clark's student-run undergraduate research journal. It publishes undergraduate academic work and is intended to provide undergraduates with "experiences in the peer review and academic publication processes." Peer reviewers consist of undergraduate and graduate students, as well as faculty. The Freudian Slip is a satire/humor publication founded in 2015. It publishes semi-weekly satirical articles about local and worldwide events. It is also the first university publication published exclusively online.

There is also a student-run internet radio station, Radio of Clark University (ROCU), with over 100 student DJs.

=== Events ===
Spree Day originated in 1903 to coincide with St. Patrick's Day. It is traditional to not tell first-year students about Spree Day. Instead, the senior class awakens the first-years by running through the quads outside of the residence halls banging pots and pans.

While Spree Day is a day of recreation, Clark University also holds the Academic Spree Day annually during Spring semester. This academic event is when Clark undergraduates present their research and creative work.

== Clark and the community ==
In 1985, the university engaged in a partnership with community groups and business organizations to revitalize Clark neighborhoods. Its efforts in the University Park Partnership program include refurbishing dilapidated or abandoned homes, reselling them to area residents, and subsidizing mortgages for new home buyers.

In 1997, Clark opened a secondary public school, the University Park Campus School (UPCS), that is also a professional development school for Clark's teacher education program. Because of its long hours and demanding curricula, UPCS has been lauded as a model for collaboration between a university and an urban district. Students are able to attend Clark University free of charge upon graduation, provided they meet certain residency and admissions requirements. In the May 16, 2005, issue of Newsweek, UPCS was named the 68th best high school in the nation. UPCS was featured in a page-one story entitled "Town-grown triumph: In poorest part of Worcester, Clark helps put children on path to college" of the November 22, 2007, edition of The Boston Globe.

The UPCS collaborative is one of several sponsored by Clark's Jacob Hiatt Center for Urban Education focused on urban teacher education and school reform.

== Research ==
Clark has seven research institutes and centers:

- The William and Jane Mosakowski Institute for Public Enterprise seeks to improve through the successful mobilization of use-inspired research the effectiveness of government and other institutions in addressing social concerns. The institute focuses on important social issues, including focal areas such as education reform, environmental sustainability, access to healthcare, human development, well-being and global change.
- The George Perkins Marsh Institute conducts collaborative, interdisciplinary research on human-environment relationships and the human dimensions of global environmental change.
- The Strassler Family Center for Holocaust and Genocide Studies is an interdisciplinary center, founded in 1998, which focuses on the causes and effects of Holocausts and Genocides around the world. It is housed in Lasry House, donated by investor Marc Lasry and his wife Cathy in honor of their fathers Irwin Cohen and Moise Lasry. Debórah Dwork is the founding director and also Rose Professor of Holocaust History at Clark.
- The Jacob Hiatt Center for Urban Education develops models of urban schooling, teaching and teacher education through local partnership, in order to learn from these models and expand the knowledge-base of effective practice through research.
- The Center for Risk and Security (CRS) at the George Perkins Marsh Institute conducts in-depth studies of homeland security issues using a risk-analysis perspective. The center's broad range of security issues includes: terrorism; disaster management; law and human rights; resource availability; and public health.
- The Center for Technology, Environment and Development (CENTED), founded in 1987, is a center for the study of natural and technological hazards in the United States. Projects include theoretical work on hazard analysis, hazard taxonomies, vulnerability, environmental equity, corporate risk management, emergency planning and hazardous waste transportation.
- Clark Labs is engaged in the research and development on geospatial technologies including the development of computer software and analytical techniques for GIS and remote sensing with an emphasis on monitoring and modeling earth system dynamics. Clark Labs continues to develop and distribute TerrSet (formerly IDRISI), a geographic information system (GIS) software package that is in use at more than 40,000 sites in over 180 countries worldwide. Its chief is Dr. J. Ronald Eastman, creator of IDRISI.

== Athletics ==
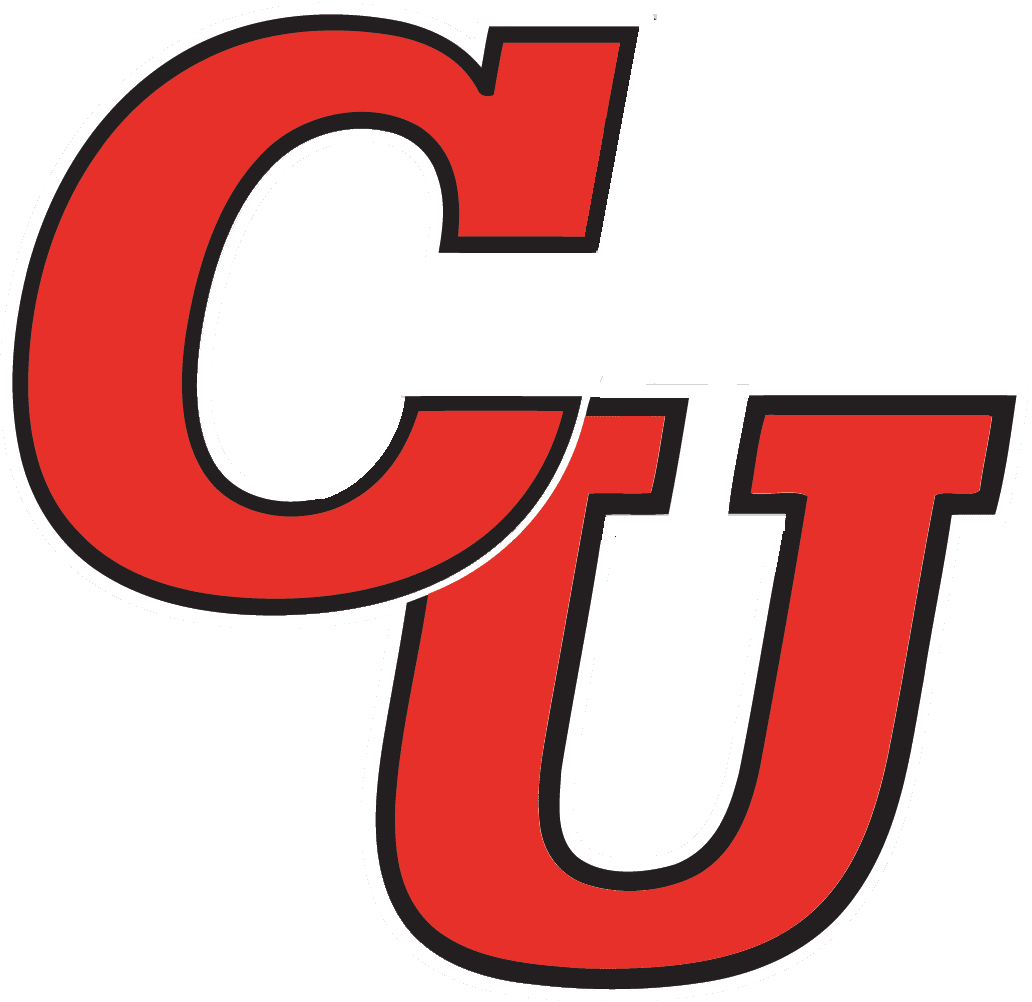
Clark athletics monogram

Clark University fields 17 NCAA Division III varsity teams which compete intercollegiately as the Clark Cougars in the New England Women's and Men's Athletic Conference. Men's sports include baseball, basketball, cross country, lacrosse, soccer, swimming and diving, and tennis; women's sports include basketball, cross country, field hockey, crew, lacrosse, soccer, softball, swimming and diving, tennis, and volleyball.

The university also offers a variety of club and intramural sports such as soccer, ice hockey, ultimate frisbee, quidditch, volleyball and basketball. This contributes to Clark's 65 percent student participation rate in athletics.

== Notable people ==
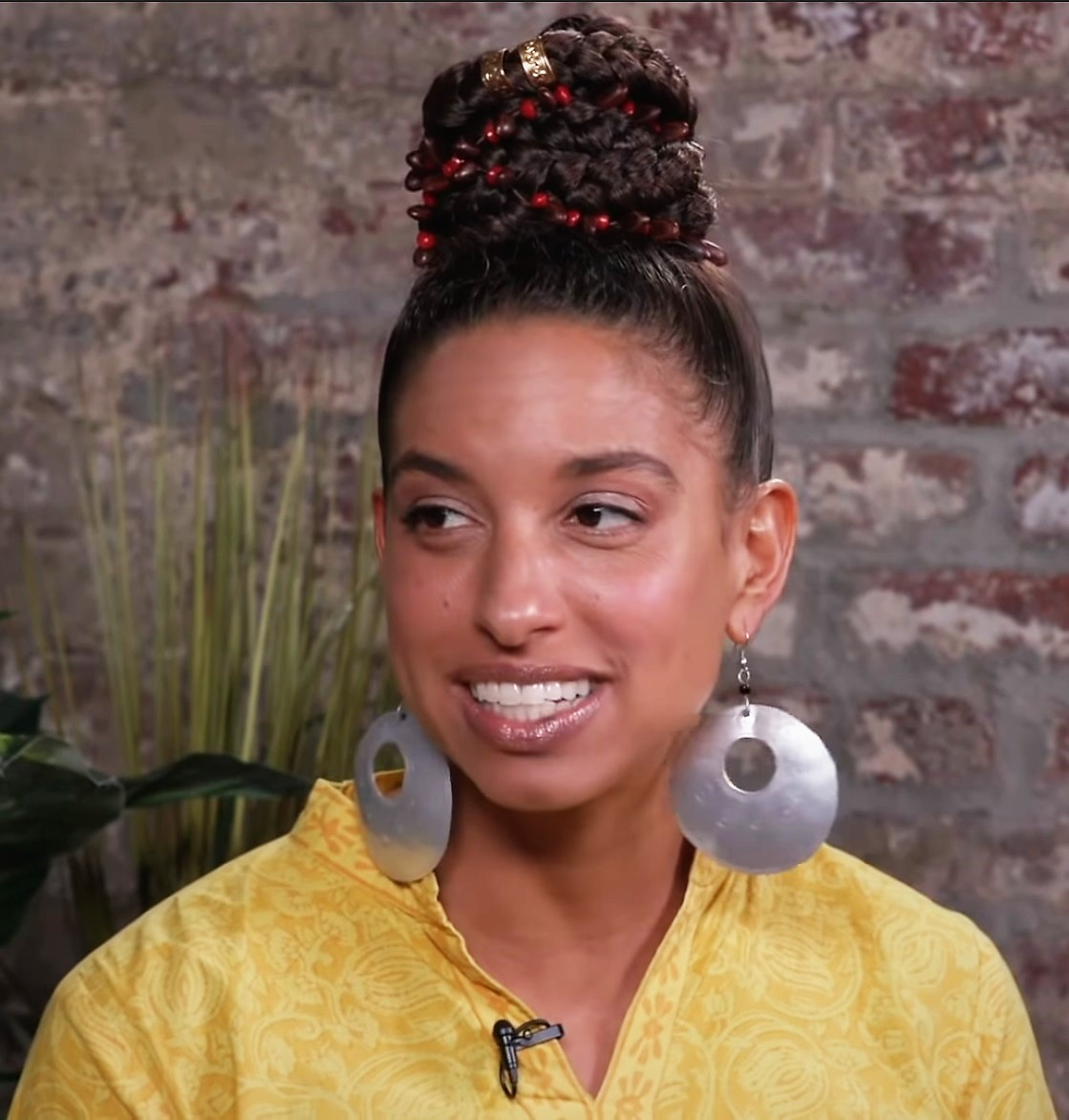
Leah Penniman started Soul Fire Farm.

The university's most famous alumnus was graduate student and professor Robert H. Goddard, a pioneering rocket scientist who conducted many experiments on campus. Clark's first president, G. Stanley Hall, founded the American Psychological Association in July 1892 at Clark. Grayson L. Kirk, a president of the Council on Foreign Relations during the Cold War and the president of Columbia University during the student protests of 1968, received his master's degree from the university, as did D'Army Bailey, a prominent civil rights activist and the founder of the National Civil Rights Museum in Memphis, Tennessee. Clark is also notable for being the site of Sigmund Freud's only lectures in the United States, and for being the university where Chinese poet Xu Zhimo earned his BA. Another alum is Leah Penniman, who attended Clark and achieved a B.A in Environmental Science and International Development, as well as an M.A in Science Education. An activist, Penniman is the co-founder of Soul Fire Farm, a New York-based farming training center and community farm.

== In popular culture ==
Gus Van Sant's The Sea of Trees was filmed in part on Clark University's campus. Leading actor Matthew McConaughey's character, Arthur Brennan, is a physics professor and scenes were filmed in and around Clark's Sackler Sciences Center. Clark was also a shooting location for the thriller Black Car, an independent film about a law student out for revenge, with Clark as the law school. The novel Something for Nothing, a semi-comic take on the struggles of a professor new to academia written by economist Michael W. Klein, is set at the fictional "Kester College," which like Clark University has a large main building that legend says was designed so that it could be converted into a factory should the college fail. Klein began his teaching career at Clark. Burning Annie, an independent comedy, was written and produced by two Clark alumni and is a semi-autobiographical film based on the experiences of one at Clark.
