= List of Clark University people =

This list of Clark University people features alumni, including currently matriculating students and alumni who are graduates or non-matriculating students of Clark University and faculty.

== Alumni ==
=== Academia ===
- Edwin Eugene Aldrin Sr. – father of Buzz Aldrin (DSc 1969), worked with Robert Goddard on his theories of rocketry (1915)
- Mildred Allen – physicist (PhD Physics 1922)
- Adelbert Ames, Jr. – research professor at Dartmouth College, pioneered the study of physiological optics
- Clarence Barber – Canadian economist (MA 1941)
- Simon Batterbury – environmental studies professor, University of Melbourne (PhD, Geography, 1997)
- Anthony Bebbington – international director, Ford Foundation; Clark University professor (PhD Geography, 1990, faculty)
- Jill Beck – president of Lawrence University, spent a summer as a Radio City Rockette while an undergraduate at Clark (BA Philosophy and Art History)
- Gwen Bell – co-founder and president of the Computer Museum (PhD Geography 1967, DSc 1994)
- Samuel Flagg Bemis – two-time recipient of the Pulitzer Prize (LHD 1937)
- Moti Bodek – Tel Aviv University and Bezalel Academy of Art and Design professor (MPA 1995)
- Hermon Carey Bumpus – fifth president of Tufts College (now Tufts University) (LLD 1909)
- Frederic Lister Burk (1862–1924) – Canadian-born American educator, educational theorist, superintendent, educational reformer, and university president (Ph.D. 1898)
- Alexander Francis Chamberlain – anthropologist
- Pinkhos Churgin (1894–1957) – Israeli first president of Bar-Ilan University
- Levi L. Conant – mathematician (no degree awarded; scholar of mathematics at Clark 1890–1891)
- V. Raymond Edman – president of Wheaton College (MA, PhD 1933)
- Rona M. Fields – psychologist and author (MA 1965)
- John H. Flavell – Stanford University professor (MA Psychology 1952, Phd 1955)
- E. Franklin Frazier – sociologist (MA)
- Yair Galily – Israeli sociologist (MSc Communications, 1996)
- Arnold Gesell – Yale professor known for his contributions to child psychology (PhD Psychology 1906)
- Henry H. Goddard – psychologist (PhD Psychology 1899)
- Robert H. Goddard – rocket engineer, invented the modern day rocket (MA Physics 1910, PhD Physics 1911, DSc 1945)
- Thomas F. Goreau – marine biologist and authority on coral reef ecology
- Frederick Grinnell – cell biologist, bio-ethicist, shortlist 2010 Royal Society Prizes for Science Books (BA Chemistry 1966)
- Clarence N. Hickman – rocket scientist and recipient of the Medal for Merit, known as the "father of scientific archery" and for his involvement in the development of the bazooka (DSc 1946)
- John Irwin Hutchinson – mathematician (no degree awarded; scholar and fellow in Mathematics at Clark 1890–1892)
- Roger Kasperson (1938–2021) – geographer and environmental risk scholar; director, Stockholm Environment Institute; Clark University provost (BA 1959, faculty)
- Grayson L. Kirk – president of the Council on Foreign Relations; president of Columbia University during the student protests of 1968 (LLD 1953)
- John Kneller – English-American professor and fifth president of Brooklyn College (B.A. 1938)
- William L. Langer – historian, head of the Research and Analysis Branch of the Office of Strategic Services (no degree awarded; took courses on international relations at Clark 1915–1917 while teaching at Worcester Academy)
- Solomon Lefschetz – mathematician (PhD 1911, DSc 1952)
- J. Ross Mackay – Canadian geographer (BA Geography 1939)
- Shannon Boyd-Bailey McCune – geographer, university president, and recipient of the Medal of Freedom (PhD Geography 1939, LLD 1960)
- Margaret Morse Nice – ornithologist (MA Biology 1915)
- Howard W. Odum – sociologist and founder of the journal Social Forces (PhD Psychology 1909)
- Vance Randolph – folklorist; his book Ozark Superstitions is dedicated to the memory of his Clark mentor G. Stanley Hall (MA Psychology)
- Mannque Rho – South Korean theoretical physicist (Bachelor's 1960, DSc 2003)
- Walter Ristow – head of map division at New York Public Library and Library of Congress (Doctorate)
- W.S. Small – experimental psychologist
- L. S. Stavrianos – historian (MA, PhD)
- Francis Sumner – first African-American to receive a Ph.D. in psychology at an American university
- Amy Tanner – psychologist
- Lewis Terman – pioneer in cognitive psychology (PhD 1905)
- L.T.E. Thompson – physicist and ballistician (Physics MA 1915, PhD 1917)
- Thomas Gordon Thompson – chemist and oceanographer, namesake of two oceanographic research ships (BA 1914)
- Albert Potter Wills – PhD advisor of the Nobel Prize winner Isidor Isaac Rabi (PhD 1897)

=== Business ===
- Sonia Gardner – co-founder of Avenue Capital Group
- Jacob Hiatt – former president of Rand-Whitney, acquired by Kraft Group in 1972, Hiatt's daughter Myra married Robert Kraft; namesake of Clark's Jacob Hiatt Center for Urban Education and Frances L. Hiatt School of Psychology, life trustee of Clark University (master's 1946, LLD 1977)
- Alan Kotok – computer pioneer, Digital architect, associate chairman of W3C (MBA 1978)
- Marc Lasry – billionaire CEO and co-founder of Avenue Capital Group (BA History 1981)
- Jeffrey Lurie – billionaire owner of Philadelphia Eagles
- Michael Marcus – commodities trader
- Hugh Panero – CEO of XM Radio (BA Government 1978)
- Thomas Peterffy – billionaire entrepreneur, founder, chairman, and CEO of Interactive Brokers Group and played a key role in founding the Boston Options Exchange
- Fred Rosen – former CEO of Ticketmaster, co-founder of the Bel Air Homeowners Alliance
- Ronald Shaich – co-founder of Au Bon Pain Inc and later founded Panera Bread

=== Government, law, and public policy ===
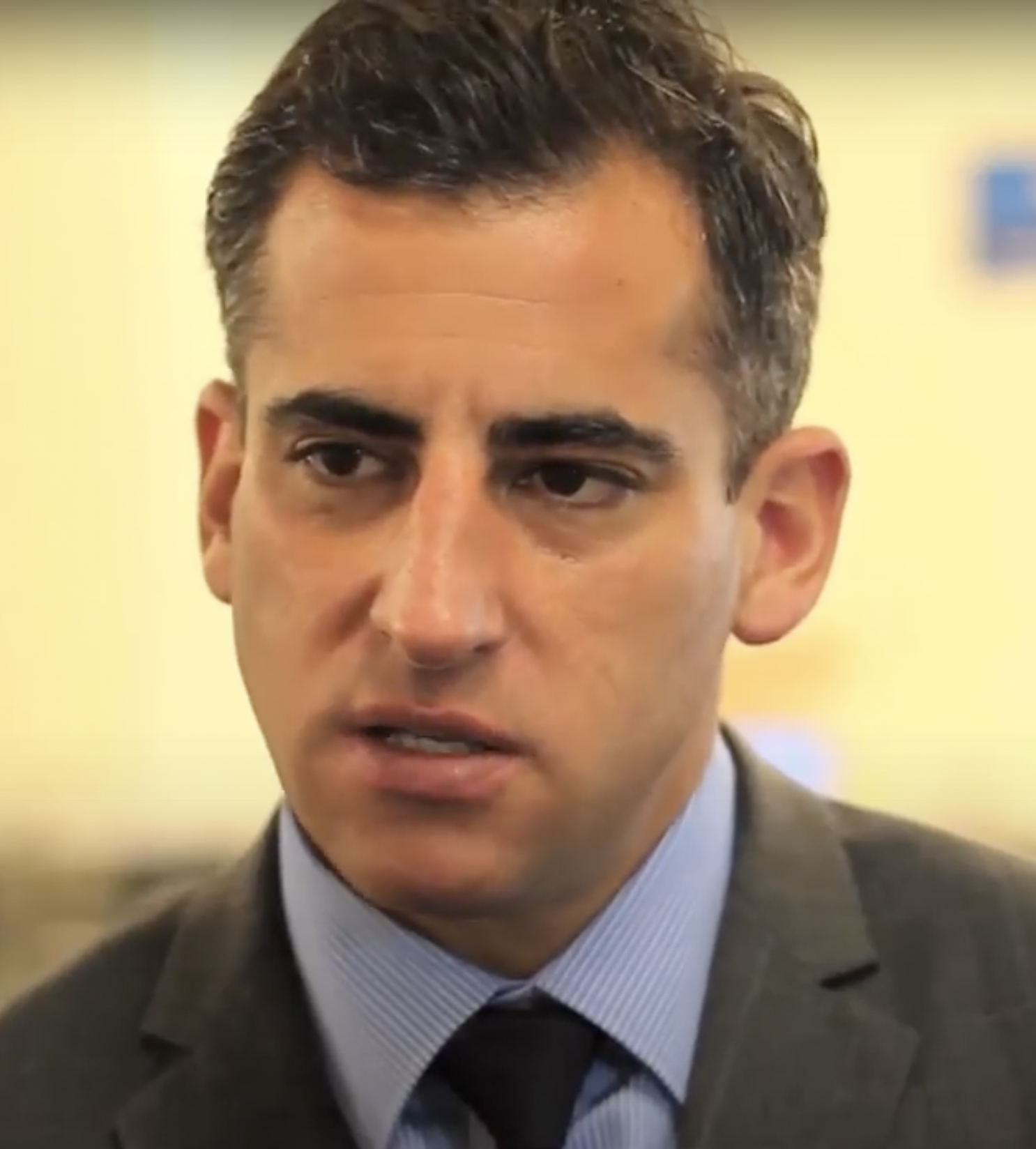
Michael P. Ross is an American lawyer and former politician from Boston, Massachusetts, who represented District 8 (which includes Beacon Hill, Back Bay, and the Fenway) on the Boston City Council from 2000 through 2013.

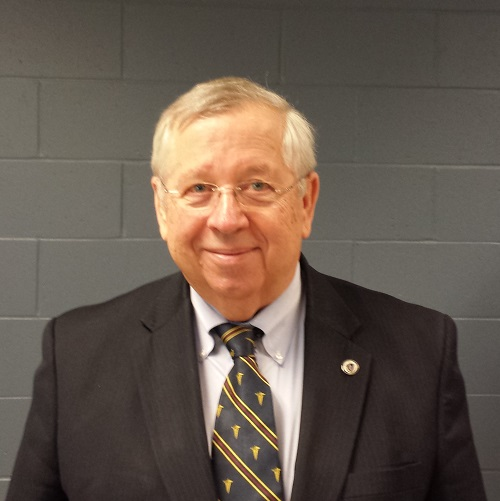
Richard T. Moore is a Democratic politician from Massachusetts and a former member of the Massachusetts State Senate.

- Adjoa Aiyetoro – lawyer, activist, executive director of the National Conference of Black Lawyers 1993–1997
- Jay Ash – former Massachusetts secretary of Housing and Economic Development, former city manager of Chelsea, Massachusetts (BA Government 1983)
- D'Army Bailey – former circuit court judge in Shelby County, Tennessee, founder of the National Civil Rights Museum, and civil rights activist
- Terri Bonoff – former Minnesota state senator and deputy senate minority leader, and 2016 congressional candidate (BA Psychology and Sociology 1979)
- David Brenerman – member of the Maine House of Representatives and ceremonial mayor of Portland, Maine (BA 1973 Government)
- Peng Chun Chang – high-level Chinese diplomat who played a pivotal role in the drafting of the Universal Declaration of Human Rights (BA 1913, LLD 1938)
- Budi Djiwandono – member of House of Representatives (Indonesia) (BA Government & International Relations 2004)
- Beth Edmonds – Maine state senator (BA Geography 1972)
- Lauren Beth Gash – former Illinois state representative
- Matt Gilman – Massachusetts DUI lawyer (BA Government 2006)
- John M. Granville – USAID diplomat assassinated in Sudan
- Stephan Hay – member of the Massachusetts House of Representatives
- Ellen Hughes-Cromwick – chief economist of the U.S. Department of Commerce (2015–17), chief global economist of Ford Motor Company, member of the Clark University Board of Trustees (2017–present) (MA International Development 1988, PhD Economics 1986)
- Hugh Llewellyn Keenleyside – Canadian ambassador to Mexico (1944–47) and commissioner of the Northwest Territories (1947–50); taught history at Clark (MA 1921, PhD 1923, LLD 1951)
- Joseph L. Kennedy – independent candidate in the United States Senate special election in Massachusetts, 2010 (BA Computer Science 1993)
- Kim Chung-yum – South Korean ambassador to Japan, chief presidential secretary, minister of Commerce and Industry, and minister of Finance (MA Economics 1959, LLD 1995)
- Mark MacDonald – member of the Vermont House of Representatives and Vermont Senate (BA Government & International Relations 1972)
- Raymond Mariano – mayor of Worcester, MA, 1993–2001 (MPA 1982)
- Floyd McKissick Jr. – North Carolina state senator, deputy senate minority leader (BA Geography)
- Libérat Mfumukeko – secretary-general of the East African Community (MBA 1994)
- Richard T. Moore – Massachusetts state senator (BA History 1966)
- Libby Pataki – First Lady of New York and wife of Republican presidential candidate George Pataki
- Michael P. Ross – member of the Boston City Council since 1999, representing District 8, which includes Beacon Hill, Back Bay, and the Fenway (BA 1993)
- Suh Sang-chul – South Korean government minister killed in the Rangoon bombing (bachelor's 1958, master's 1959, posthumous LLD 1984)
- Brian P. Stern – associate justice, Rhode Island Superior Court
- Olta Xhaçka – Albanian minister of Defense and former minister of Social Welfare and Youth

=== Medicine ===
- Anna L. Brown (died 1924) – Canadian-born American physician; a leading authority on health for girls in the U.S.
- Bruce Lerman – cardiologist; chief of the Division of Cardiology and director of the Cardiac Electrophysiology Laboratory at Weill Cornell Medicine and the New York Presbyterian Hospital

=== Military ===
- Andrew J. Olmsted – U.S. Army major; blogger; killed in action while serving in the Iraq War (BA Government & International Relations 1992)

=== Journalism and media ===
- Ben Bagdikian – educator and Pulitzer Prize-winning journalist, played a major role in publishing the Pentagon Papers; editor of The Clark News while an undergraduate (LittD 1963)
- Mark Bittman – food journalist for The New York Times and author of How to Cook Everything
- Otis Ferguson – film critic for The New Republic in the 1930s
- Ronald Kessler – journalist and author
- Jon "Stugotz" Weiner – co-host of The Dan Le Batard Show with Stugotz on ESPN Radio (BMOC)

=== Literature ===
- Christopher Collier – children's author (My Brother Sam is Dead) (BA 1951, LHD 2008)
- Betsy Wollheim – president, co-publisher and co-editor-in-chief of science fiction and fantasy publisher DAW Books
- Xu Zhimo – 20th-century Chinese romantic poet

=== Art, entertainment, and architecture ===
- Moti Bodek – Israeli architect; senior lecturer in architecture at Bezalel Academy of Art and Design, Jerusalem (MPA 1995)
- Corey Carrier – child actor (BA)
- Steven DePaul – Emmy Award-winning television producer and director of NYPD Blue (BA English 1972)
- Ali Fedotowsky – host of NBC television show 1st Look, star of the sixth season of The Bachelorette (BA Psychology 2006)
- Frances Forever – singer-songwriter (BA Music Technology 2021)
- Mitch Glazer – film producer and screenwriter (Scrooged, The Recruit, Lost in Translation)
- Alexander Gould – actor, voice of Nemo in Finding Nemo
- John Heard – actor (BA History 1968)
- Padma Lakshmi – host of television show Top Chef (BA Theater 1992)
- Eric Macksoud – contestant on Survivor 51
- Paul Pena – singer, songwriter and guitarist
- Ben Schechter – Internet artist (BA Government 2003)
- Brian Shactman – former ESPN broadcaster; co-anchor of Worldwide Exchange on CNBC (MA English)

=== Religion ===
- Frederick Madison Smith – religious leader; author; a prophet-president of the Community of Christ Reorganized Church of Jesus Christ of Latter Day Saints, now renamed Community of Christ (PhD 1916)

=== Athletics and exploration ===
- Jeffrey Lurie – owner of Philadelphia Eagles (BA Psychology 1973)
- Paul Siple – Antarctic explorer and inventor of wind chill factor (PhD Geography 1939, DSc 1958)

=== Activism and reform ===
- William Aramony – CEO of United Way of America, later convicted of fraud (BA 1949)
- Pilar Barbosa – Puerto Rican educator and activist
- Robert Dexter – human rights (PhD Sociology 1927)
- Miriam Van Waters – prison reformer
- Mesfin Woldemariam – Ethiopian human rights activist

== Faculty ==
- Taner Akcam
- David Angel
- Jeffrey Arnett
- Wallace Atwood (LLD 1946)
- Louis M. Aucoin
- Georg Baur
- Anthony Bebbington
- George Athan Billias
- George Hubbard Blakeslee (LLD 1941)
- Franz Boas (LLD 1909)
- Oskar Bolza
- Edwin G. Boring
- Rafael Bruschweiler
- Leonard Carmichael
- Gary Chaison
- Saul B. Cohen
- William Damon
- Stephen DiRado
- Debórah Dwork
- J. Ronald Eastman – professor of Geography, chief developer of IDRISI
- Cynthia Enloe
- Everett Fox
- Richard M. Freeland
- Benjamin Ives Gilman
- Robert Goddard (MA Physics 1910, PhD Physics 1911, DSc 1945)
- Beverly Grier
- G. Stanley Hall – first president of the university (LLD 1924)
- Susan Hanson – geographer
- Tamara Hareven
- George E. Hargest – accounting teacher and philatelist
- David S. Hibbett
- Alan A. Jones
- Roger Kasperson
- Robert Kates
- Wolfgang Köhler
- Charles A. Kraus (DSc 1949)
- Thomas Kuhne
- William L. Langer
- Jon Leiberman
- Douglas Little
- Drew McCoy
- J. Playfair McMurrich
- Albert Abraham Michelson (PhysD 1909)
- John Ulric Nef
- Arthur Amos Noyes (LLD 1909)
- Richard Peet
- Gregory Pincus
- Relly Raffman
- Martin André Rosanoff
- Robert J.S. Ross
- Ellen Churchill Semple
- Christina Hoff Sommers
- William Edward Story
- Amy Tanner
- Robert Deam Tobin
- Billie Lee Turner II
- Jaan Valsiner
- Arthur Gordon Webster
- Heinz Werner
- James Wertsch
- Charles Otis Whitman (BiolD 1909)
- Carroll D. Wright (LLD 1902)
