= Martin Fleming =

American economist

- Born: March 19, 1953 (age 72)
- Education: University of Massachusetts Lowell (B.Sc. Mathematics, 1974); Tufts University (M.A. Economics, 1976; Ph.D. Economics, 1980)
- Occupation(s): Economist and Business Executive
- Title: Research Scientist at MIT’s FutureTech Lab, Fellow, The Productivity Institute; former, Chief Revenue Scientist at Varicent; former Vice President and Chief Economist at IBM

Martin Fleming (born March 19, 1953) is an American economist and business executive. He is a Research Scientist at MIT's FutureTech Lab and a Fellow of The Productivity Institute, the UK research organization. From 2010 until 2019, he served as both IBM's Chief Economist and Chief Analytics Officer.

His first book, Breakthrough: A Growth Revolution was published in October 2022 by Business Expert Press.

== Early life and education ==
Fleming was born in Lowell, Massachusetts. He graduated in 1974 from the University of Massachusetts, Lowell with a Bachelor of Science degree in mathematics. Fleming earned a Master of Arts degree in economics from Tufts University in 1976, and in 1980 he completed a Ph.D. in economics.

== Career ==
Fleming began his career as a research assistant at the Alfred P. Sloan School of Management at Massachusetts Institute of Technology. In 1986, he joined the publishing company Cahners Business Information, which later became Reed-Elsevier, Inc., and where, in 1991, he was named vice president, Strategy. In 1996 he became a principal economic consultant at Abt Associates in Cambridge, Massachusetts.

IBM

In 1999 Fleming was hired by IBM as head of its Emerging Business Opportunity program, and also managed planning and strategy for global sales and distribution. In 2006 he joined the company's Corporate Strategy team. He also chaired a "Smarter Planet" committee that focused on reducing the company's environmental footprint and developing energy-saving products.

In 2010, Fleming was named IBM's Chief Economist and Chief Analytics Officer. In that role, Fleming provided weekly macroeconomic reports to IBM's Chief Executive Officer (first, Samuel J. Palmisano, and then, Ginni Rometty) and senior leadership teams.

He produced IBM's Global Economic Outlook, which he regularly presented to IBM's Fortune 500 clients. As head of IBM's analytics team, Fleming led key elements of IBM's business transformation initiatives, employing machine learning, artificial intelligence and natural language processing in a cloud computing environment.

Varicent and The Productivity Institute

Fleming was chief revenue scientist at Varicent, a Toronto-based sales performance management software provider from 2020 to 2024. He is a Fellow of the Productivity Institute, a UK-based research organization that studies what productivity means for business, workers and communities.

Additionally, Fleming is a consultant to the U.S. Bureau of Economic Analysis.

== Boards and memberships ==
Fleming is a member and former chair of the Conference of Business Economists, and a participant in the Brookings Productivity Measurement Initiative, organized by David Wessel and chaired by Janet Yellen.

He has also served on the Board of the National Association for Business Economics, and chaired its Statistics Committee, its committee on economic indicators and the Julius Shiskin Awards Committee. He served on the board of the Boston Association of Business Economists, including a term as president.

Fleming was a member of the Federal Economics Statistics Advisory Committee and a member of the Federal Reserve Bank of New York's Fintech Advisory Committee.

== Breakthrough: A Growth Revolution (book) ==
Fleming is the author of Breakthrough: A Growth Revolutionwas published in October 2022 by Business Expert Press. In the book, Fleming applies a unique approach that combines deep analysis of current economic and societal trends with a rich history of the four major industrial revolutions.

Fleming argues that conditions are ripe for a post-pandemic global growth revolution – if government leaders, business executives and workers come together to adopt a proposed “Growth and Fairness Agenda” designed to break five decades of stagnating real wages, limited GDP and productivity growth, and declines in labor's income share.

According to Susan Lund, vice president, economics and private sector development, International Finance Corporation, World Bank Group, “Fleming has written an engaging and important book that identifies actionable pathways for inclusive growth in the post-pandemic recovery.”

Stuart P.M. Mackintosh, executive director, Group of Thirty, said: “{Breakthrough} is an outstanding book, laying out the dynamics of the ongoing AI-industrial revolution. It deserves a reading by a wide audience of economists, policymakers, analysts, and students across disciplines.”

Diane Swonk, Chief Economist for KPMG, summarized Breakthrough: "Fleming lays out a road map for hope. He sees the potential a way to overcome some of our largest economic hurdles."

Fleming will present key findings from Breakthrough at a series of conferences and events in autumn 2022, including the MIT Computational Foundations of Prosperity, the National Association for Business Economics (NABE) Annual Meeting, the World KLEMS Conference, the NABE Tech Economics conference, and the annual Conference of Business Economists Meeting.

== Publications and presentations ==
Fleming has authored and co-authored a number of articles about current economic issues. His work has been published in professional journals, including the Journal of Economic and Social Measurement, Business Economics and American Demographics, as well as in the New York Times and the Wall Street Journal.

Fleming has testified before the Joint Economic Committee and contributed to the American Chemical Society Science and Congress Report on Intellectual Property Products. He has also given keynote speeches and participated on panel discussions, including the MIT Center for Digital Business Roundtable on the Digital Economy, the MIT Big Data Summit, the National Association for Business Economics conference, the California Center for Service Science at the University of California and the Dealbook's Opportunities For Tomorrow conference in New York City.

== Personal life ==
In 1974 Fleming married Patricia Marie Magnan. The couple have two children.
