= Rosanoff =

Rosanoff is a surname. Notable people with the surname include:

- Aaron Rosanoff (1878-1943) a Russian-American psychiatrist
- Martin André Rosanoff (1874–1951) a Russian-American chemist
- Lillian Rosanoff Lieber (1886-1986) a mathematician and popular author
- Marie Roemaet Rosanoff (1896-1967), Belgian-American cellist

== See also ==
- Rozanov
