= Sleepeezee =

Sleepeezee Limited
- Company type: Private
- Industry: Mattresses
- Founded: 1924
- Headquarters: Rochester, UK
- Products: Mattresses, Beds

Sleepeezee Limited T/A Sleepeezee is a British manufacturer of mattresses situated in Kent. It has a Royal Warrant of Appointment for its products. Travelodge UK feature their mattresses.

== History ==
In 1964 it was bought by the Simmons Bedding Company, and moved its premises. It was owned by Cauval Group of France (who made the Cumfilux brand) as part of Continental Sleep Holdings from the early 1990s when it bought the company for £17m, but went into receivership in February 2016, and is now owned by Adova Group, funded by Perceva.

It received a Royal Warrant to the Queen in 1963. In 1985 it received a Royal Warrant to the Prince of Wales.

Sleepezee donated £60,000 to Sheffield Children’s Hospital in 2021. The donation was funded by sales of Sleepeezee’s ‘Jessica’ range of mattresses. The company donated £20 per sale to the children’s hospital.

== Structure ==
It is a member of the National Bed Federation. It makes its mattresses in Strood.
