= Aucoin =

Aucoin is a surname of French Belgian origin. Notable people with the surname include:

- Adrian Aucoin (born 1973), Canadian ice hockey player
- Bill Aucoin (1943–2010), American band manager
- Derek Aucoin (born 1970), Canadian baseball pitcher
- Hubert Meen Aucoin (1874–1952), Canadian politician
- Vice Admiral Joseph Aucoin, United States Navy, formerly Commander of the 7th Fleet
- Keith Aucoin (born 1978), American ice hockey player
- Kelly AuCoin, American actor
- Kevyn Aucoin (1962–2002), American make-up artist and photographer
- Les AuCoin (born 1942), United States Congressman from Oregon
- Louis M. Aucoin, United Nations Secretary-General Deputy Special Representative for Liberia
- Matthew Aucoin (born 1990), American composer, conductor, pianist and writer
- Peter Aucoin (1943–2011), professor
- Rich Aucoin, Canadian indie rock musician
