= DiRado =

DiRado is a surname. Notable people with the surname include:

- Maya DiRado (born 1993), American swimmer
- Stephen DiRado (born 1957), American photographer
