= Lillian Rosanoff Lieber =

Russian-American mathematician

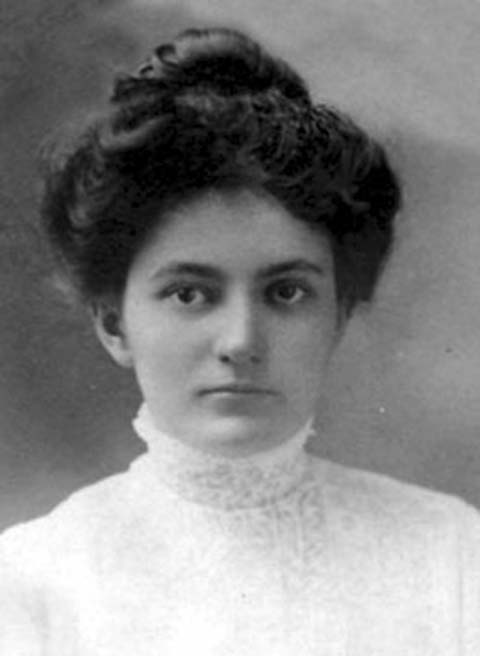
- Born: July 26, 1886; Nicolaiev, Russian Empire
- Died: July 11, 1986 (aged 99); Queens, New York City, New York, U.S.
- Education: Barnard College (AB); Columbia University (MA); Clark University (PhD in chemistry)
- Occupations: Mathematician, author
- Employer(s): Long Island University; Bryn Mawr College; Wells College; Connecticut College
- Known for: Popular mathematics books in free-verse style; The Education of T. C. MITS; The Einstein Theory of Relativity
- Spouse: Hugh Gray Lieber

Lillian Rosanoff Lieber (July 26, 1886 in Nicolaiev, Russian Empire – July 11, 1986 in Queens, New York) was a Russian-American mathematician and popular author. She often teamed up with her illustrator husband, Hugh Gray Lieber, to produce works.

== Life and career ==
=== Early life and education ===
Lieber was one of four children of Abraham H. and Clara (Bercinskaya) Rosanoff. Her brothers were Denver publisher Joseph Rosenberg, psychiatrist Aaron Rosanoff, and chemist Martin André Rosanoff. Aaron and Martin changed their names to sound more Russian and less Jewish. Lieber moved to the US with her family in 1891. She received her A.B. from Barnard College in 1908, her M.A. from Columbia University in 1911, and her Ph.D. in chemistry from Clark University in 1914, under Martin's direction; at Clark, Solomon Lefschetz was a classmate. She married Hugh Gray Lieber on October 27, 1926.

=== Career ===
After teaching at Hunter College from 1908 to 1910, and in the New York City high school system (1910–1912, 1914–1915), she became a Research Fellow at Bryn Mawr College from 1915 to 1917; she then went on to teach at Wells College from 1917 to 1918 as Instructor of Physics (also acting as head of the physics department), and at the Connecticut College for Women (1918 to 1920). She joined the mathematics department at Long Island University (LIU) in Brooklyn, New York (LIU Brooklyn) in 1934, became department chair in 1945 (taking over from Hugh when he became Professor, and Chair, of Art at LIU), and was made a full professor in 1947, until her retirement in 1954; she was appointed director of LIU's Galois Institute of Mathematics (later the Galois Institute of Mathematics and Art) (named for Évariste Galois) in 1934. Over her career she published some 17 books, which were written in a unique, free-verse style and illustrated with whimsical line drawings by her husband. Her highly accessible writings were praised by no less than Albert Einstein, Cassius Jackson Keyser, Eric Temple Bell, and S. I. Hayakawa. Concerning her book, The Education of T. C. MITS, Dorothy Canfield Fisher said:

This is quite different from any other book you ever bought... full of mathematics and full of humor... also full of a deep, healing philosophy of life, reassuring, strengthening, [and] humane..."

She edited several volumes of Galois lectures, including Martin's A Practical Simplification of the Method of Least Squares, several talks by Alonzo Church, and Lattice Theory by Garrett Birkhoff. Although Lieber retired from Long Island University in 1954, she continued to write and publish into the 1960s.

=== Personal obscurity ===
Few details of Lillian Lieber's life and career have survived, even at Long Island University. She died in Queens, New York just weeks shy of her 100th birthday. She came from a well-educated Jewish family. Details can be found in the out of print book, Yesterday, that was written by her cousin Miriam Shomer Zunser in the 1930s.

== Unusual typography ==
In addition to enlivening her books with illustrations (or "psyquaports") by her husband, Hugh Gray Lieber (who was head of the Department of Fine Arts at Long Island University), Lillian often chose an unusual scheme of typography which is self-explained in this example from her Preface to The Education of T. C. MITS:

This is not intended to befree verse.Writing each phrase on a separate linefacilitates rapid reading,and everyoneis in a hurrynowadays.

T.C. MITS was an acronym for "The Celebrated Man In The Street," a character who, like George Gamow's Mr Tompkins, served as a device for bringing concepts in higher mathematics and physics to the general public. The MITS character was central to Lieber's populist approach to education, and she often laced her expositions with passages extolling the virtues of the democratic system.

== "The Lillian Lieber Standard" ==
In her book, The Einstein Theory of Relativity, Lillian Lieber stated her views on the inclusion of mathematics in books intended for "the celebrated man [or woman] in the streets:"

...just enough mathematics to HELP and NOT to HINDER the lay reader... Many 'popular' discussions of Relativity, without any mathematics at all, have been written. But we doubt whether even the best of these can possibly give to a novice an adequate idea of what it is all about.... On the other hand, there are many [books on relativity] that are accessible to experts only."

The Cavendish Press in Ann Arbor, Michigan, has adopted Lillian's rule of thumb with some elaboration.

== Works ==
Although her works were broadly influential (including a special paperback edition of The Education of T. C. MITS that was circulated to American servicemen during World War II), they remained out of print for decades. Starting in 2007, publisher Paul Dry Books has reissued The Education of T.C. MITS, Infinity, and The Einstein Theory of Relativity.

- 1931 Non-Euclidean Geometry, Academy Press.
- 1932 Galois and the Theory of Groups, Science Press Printing Company, Lancaster, PA.
- 1936 The Einstein Theory of Relativity, Science Press Printing Company, Lancaster, PA.
- 1940 Non-Euclidean Geometry; or, Three Moons in Mathesis, Science Press Printing Company, Lancaster, PA.
- 1942 The Education of T. C. MITS, Galois Institute of Mathematics and Art, Brooklyn, NY..
- 1944 The Education of T. C. MITS, W. W. Norton & Company, NY, (Revised and Enlarged edition)
- 1945 The Einstein theory of Relativity, Farrar & Rinehart, NY & Toronto. (Part I of this edition is the same material published in 1936. Part II was new in this edition.)
- 1946 Modern Mathematics for T. C. Mits, The Celebrated Man in the Street, G. Allen & Unwin Ltd, London, 1st London Edition.
- 1946 Take a Number: Mathematics for the Two Billion, The Jaques Cattell Press, Lancaster, PA.
- 1947 Mits, Wits and Logic, (1st Edition) W. W. Norton & Company, NY.
- 1949 The Einstein Theory of Relativity, D. Dobson, London.
- 1953, 2008 Infinity: Beyond the Beyond the Beyond, Edited & Foreword by Barry Mazur, Paul Dry Books, Rinehart, NY.
- 1954 Mits, Wits, and Logic, (Revised Edition) Galois Institute of Mathematics and Art, Brooklyn, NY.
- 1956 Human Values of Modern Mathematics a Book of Essays, Galois Institute of Mathematics and Art, Brooklyn, NY.
- 1959 Lattice Theory: The Atomic Age in Mathematics, Galois Institute of Mathematics and Art, Brooklyn, NY.
- 1960 Mits, Wits, and Logic, (3d Edition) W. W. Norton & Company, NY.
- 1961 Human Values and Science, Art and Mathematics, (1st Edition) W. W. Norton & Company, NY.
- 1961 Galois and the Theory of Groups: A Bright Star in Mathesis, Galois Institute of Mathematics and Art, Brooklyn, NY.
- 1963 Mathematics: First S-t-e-p-s, F. Watts, NY.
- 2007 The Education of T. C. MITS: What Modern Mathematics Means to You, Foreword by Barry Mazur, Paul Dry Books, Philadelphia, PA.
- 2008 The Einstein theory of Relativity: A Trip To the Fourth Dimension, Paul Dry Books, Philadelphia, PA.
- 2017 Take a Number: Mathematics for the Two Billion, Dover Publications, Mineola, NY.
