= Travelodge (British company) =

British budget hotel chain

Travelodge Hotels Limited
- Formerly: Aeroclean Limited, (1963–1978); The Fernley Aeroclean Company Limited (1963–1978); Trusthouse Forte Airport Services Limited (1978–1984); Trusthouse Forte (U.K.) Limited (1984–1991); Forte (U.K.) Limited (1991–2001); Travelrest Services Limited (2001–2004)
- Type: Private limited company
- Industry: Hospitality
- Founded: 1985
- Headquarters: Thame, England, United Kingdom
- Number of locations: Over 600 hotels in the UK (2024); 11 hotels in Ireland (2024); 11 hotels in Spain (2024)
- Area served: United Kingdom; Republic of Ireland; Spain
- Key people: Martin Robinson (chairman); Ray Reidy (CFO, interim CEO)
- Products: Hotels
- Revenue: ▲£909.9m (31 December 2022)
- Operating income: ▲EBITDA profit of £212.9m (31 December 2022)
- Net income: ▲£154.2m (31 December 2022)
- Total assets: ▲£888.4m (net) (2010)
- Owner: GoldenTree Asset Management
- Number of employees: Over 13,000 (2024)
- Website: travelodge.co.uk

Travelodge Hotels Limited, trading as Travelodge, is a private company operating in the hotels and hospitality industry throughout the United Kingdom, Ireland and Spain.

== Company history ==
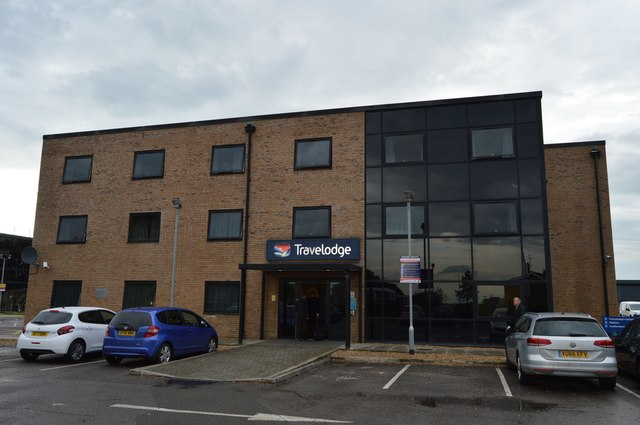
Travelodge in Bedford

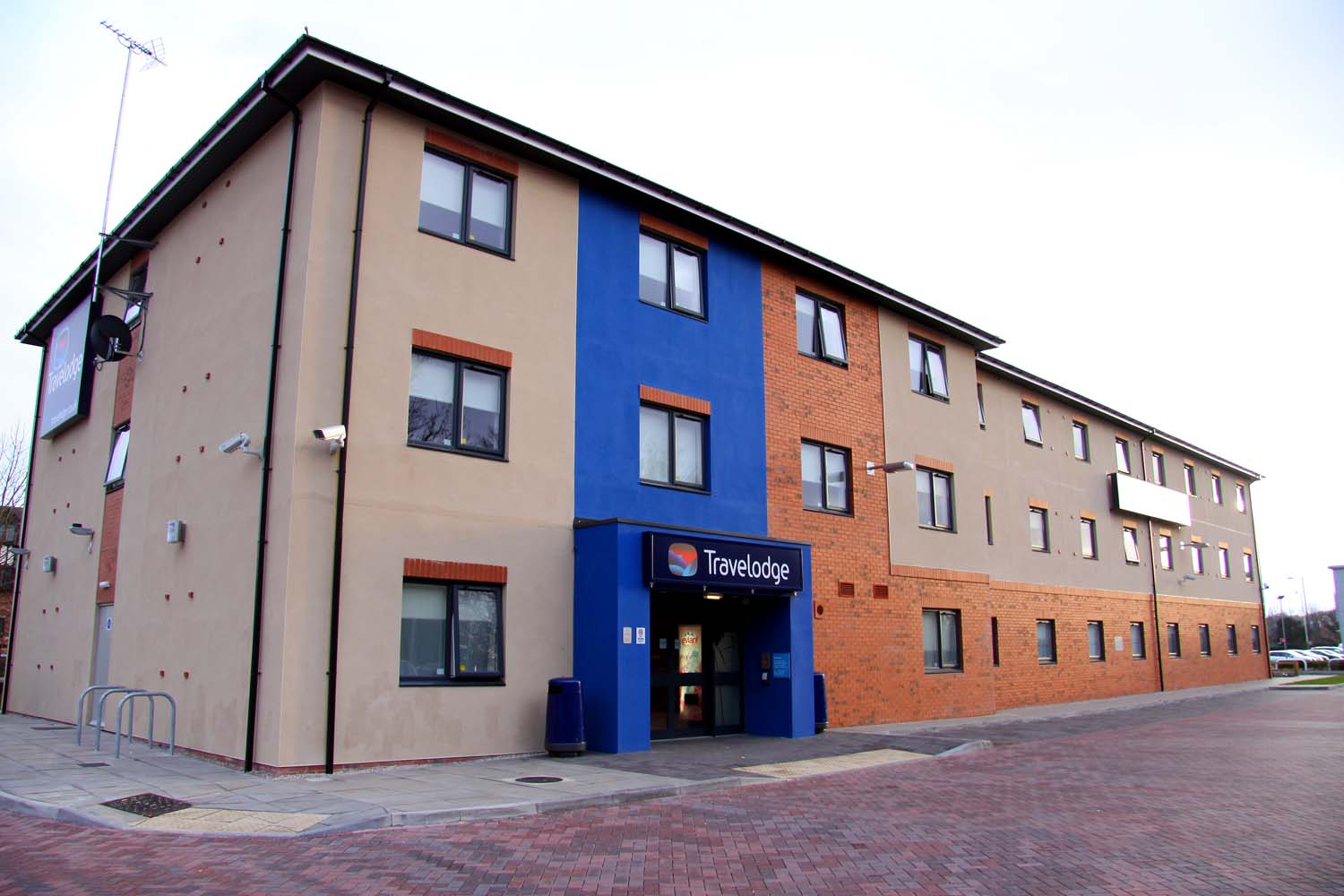
Travelodge in Bromborough

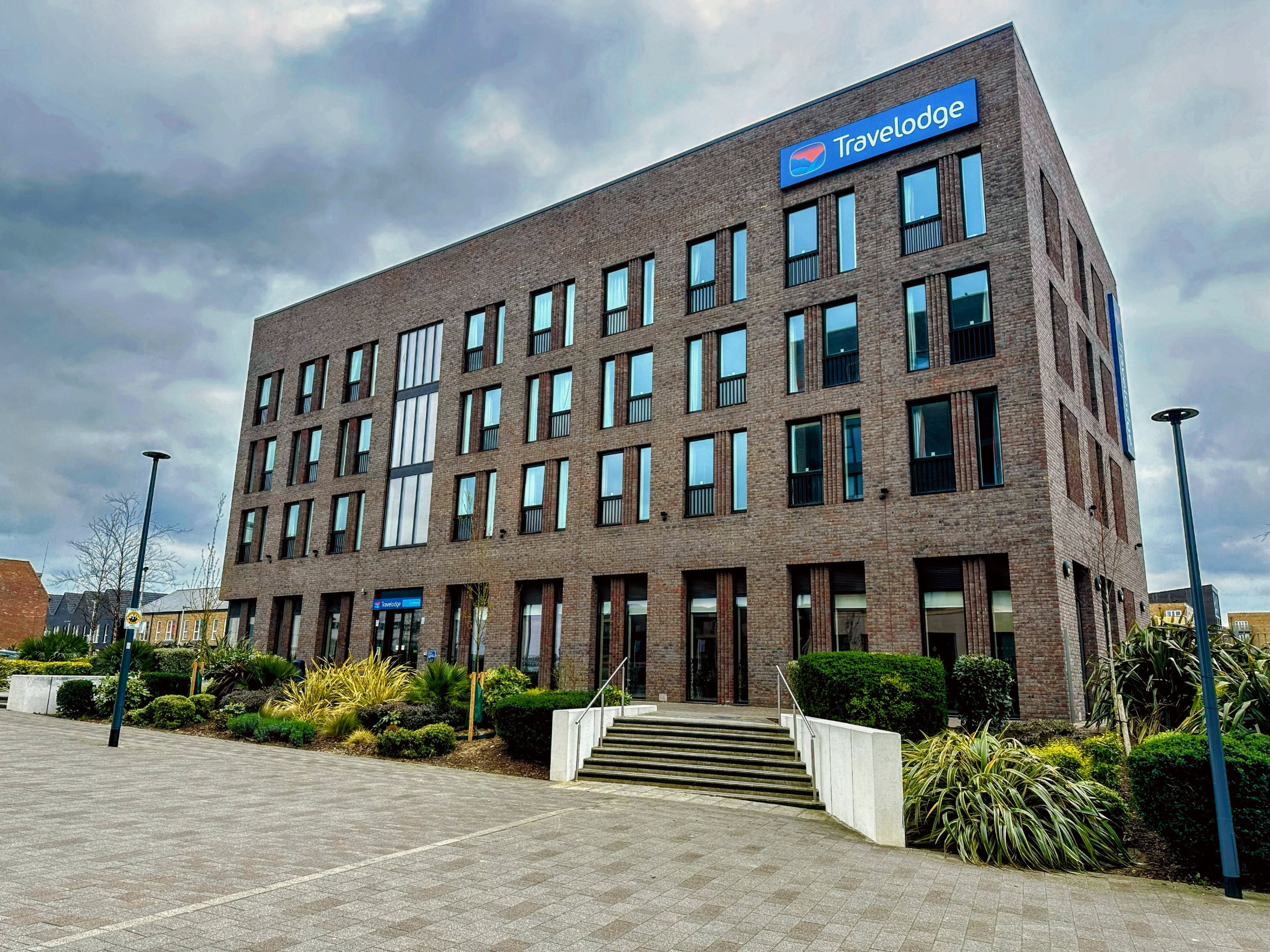
Travelodge in Rochester Riverside, Kent

=== Opening by Trusthouse Forte ===
In the early 1970s, Charles Forte imported the Travelodge brand from the United States with the hope of establishing it in the UK. The first Travelodge locations opened in 1973 in former Excelsior Motor Lodge branches, a brand of motels owned by Forte which were located near busy roads. In 1976, Trusthouse Forte would open Little Chef Lodges; these were attached to Little Chef restaurants and the first chain of budget hotels in the UK. In 1988, the two chains were combined and rebranded to become "Forte Travelodge".

=== Granada ownership ===
In 1995, Travelodge became part of Granada, after they completed a hostile takeover of Forte Group (formerly Trusthouse Forte). Granada decided to open Travelodges away from the roadside, with the first urban Travelodge opening in 1997. In 2001, Granada merged and then de-merged with Compass Group, where their hospitality interests were transferred to Compass.

=== Sale to Permira ===
In February 2003, Travelodge and Little Chef were sold by Compass to Permira, who created the special-purpose entity, TLLC Group Holdings Ltd and moved Travelodge's headquarters from Toddington in Bedfordshire to Thame in Oxfordshire in June 2003.

In 2004, it bought the Moat House hotel on Drury Lane for £11m, and the 'London Farringdon' and 'London Islington' Thistle hotels. In July of that year, it decided to sell 136 of its hotels for £400m, then lease them back.

In October 2005, Permira sold Little Chef to The People's Restaurant Group for £52 million, whilst retaining Travelodge.

=== Purchase by Dubai International Capital ===
In August 2006, Travelodge was sold to Dubai International Capital (DIC), a United Arab Emirates-based company, for £675 million.

In mid-2010, Travelodge bought 52 Innkeeper's Lodge properties from the Mitchells & Butlers pub chain, leaving less than half the original number of Innkeeper's Lodge hotels. In 2011, Travelodge announced a tie-up with British supermarket Waitrose to develop three joint sites in the UK.

=== Financial restructuring in 2012 ===
In February 2012, DIC had to prepare a bailout package due to a large debt of £17.5 million that was added to Travelodge's balance sheet following its purchase; despite significant earnings since 2006, these could not cover the debt repayments and the company recorded a debt of £517m in 2011. The company's ownership passed to New York-based hedge funds GoldenTree Asset Management and Avenue Capital Group, as well as Goldman Sachs. On 17 August 2012 Travelodge UK confirmed that the financial restructuring would be through a company voluntary arrangement which would include:

- At least £75m of new money being injected into the company.
- £55m being invested into a major refurbishment programme across the estate, covering over 11,000 rooms and 175 hotels. The refurbishment programme was due to start in early 2013 and continue through to summer 2014.
- Bank debt of £235m will be written off and £71m repaid, reducing total bank debt from £635m to £329m.

However, Travelodge also stated that it was no longer viable to operate 49 hotels (8% of the estate), for which the company would now seek new operators.

Hotels transferred to other hotel operators include Edinburgh Belford transferred to Britannia Hotels, Blackpool transferred to Ibis, Huddersfield, Liphook and Walsall transferred to Metro Inns, and Bolton Services, Eastbourne, Edinburgh Haymarket, Manchester Airport, Manchester Worsley and Wentbridge transferred to independent operators. Travelodge's hotels in Coventry and Sutton Scotney (North and South) were closed. Travelodge UK also operate eleven hotels in Ireland and five in Spain. In late 2023, they also a new contactless hotel in St Albans.

== Description ==
Travelodge is known for its budget style hotels and room types. They have a range of hotels across the United Kingdom, Ireland and Spain. Travelodge offers many different room types, from their iconographic standard budget style to a more sleek-high end look. In 2022, they introduced a new look and style and began refitting their existing hotels as well as any newly opened sites. During this refurb, they renovated the Bar Cafés, reception areas, and rooms & bathrooms.

== Controversies ==
=== Overbooking ===
In 2006, the BBC programme Watchdog highlighted Travelodge's policy of overbooking their hotels, turning guests away even when they have booked against a credit card, which resulted in leaving customers stranded late at night with nowhere to sleep. In 2018, Watchdog Live on The One Show returned to the issue, with further examples of Travelodge failing to provide rooms on arrival to customers with 'guaranteed' bookings. The issue has been widely reported in subsequent years across the media, highlighting that Travelodge would oversell expensive hotels, and then relocate travellers to cheaper alternatives in less desirable locations, yet not refund the difference. A report by The Guardian highlighted that customers were at risk of having nowhere to sleep even though they had pre-paid for their rooms, and that Travelodge offers no compensation for customers who are affected. A report in the Daily Mirror claimed the practice was a breach-of-contract by Travelodge.

=== Plymouth advertising ===
To advertise its new location in Plymouth in 2004, Travelodge ran a poster campaign using the phrase "Other hotels in Plymouth fleece you, we prefer duvets" which was not well received by other hotels in the area and was reported to the Advertising Standards Authority.

=== Eviction of homeless families ===
In March 2020, The Guardian reported that Travelodge gave homeless families and key workers only two hours' notice to leave when it shut 360 of its UK hotels in response to the Coronavirus pandemic. Although the government had told hotels to close, this did not apply to those accommodating key workers or homeless people. In May 2023, The Guardian reported that homeless families being housed in the Enfield Travelodge were being removed due to an upcoming Beyonce concert set to take place at the nearby Tottenham Hotspur stadium between 29 May and 4 June.

=== Release of room keys without permission ===
In December 2022, staff at a Travelodge in Maidenhead gave a duplicate room key of a woman staying at the hotel, to a man who had seen the woman at a party. He entered the room as she slept, and sexually assaulted her in her bed. Travelodge responded by offering her £30 in compensation. The attacker was later jailed for seven and a half years for the assault.

In October 2025, a woman checked into a London Travelodge to escape a domestic abuser. The abuser then arrived at the hotel looking for the woman, told staff she was having a "seizure", and asked for a room key. Staff at the hotel gave him a duplicate key to her room; the man then forcefully entered the room and attacked the woman. Travelodge responded by offering the woman another room at the hotel.

On 17 August 2026, Jo Boydell stepped down as CEO. The company's chief financial officer, Ray Reidy, has taken over the role of CEO on an interim basis.

== Trivia ==
In 2007, The Daily Telegraph reported that David and Jean Davidson, a retired couple originally from Sheffield, had stayed at Travelodges in Newark, Worksop and Grantham for a combined total of 22 years, effectively making Travelodge their home. The retired banker and former sailor and his wheelchair-using wife found the cost of their stay comparable with living in a house, but with the benefits of housekeeping service and without added costs such as council tax or utilities.
