= Constance Hunter =

American economist

Constance L. Hunter

Academic background
- Education: School of International and Public Affairs, Columbia University (SIPA); New York University

Academic work
- Discipline: Chief economist Macroeconomics; Financial forecasting
- Institutions: Economist Intelligence Unit
- Notable ideas: "Covid's economic reset: making the quixotic quotidian"
- Website: EIU/ConstanceHunter

Constance Hunter is an American economist. She is a former principal and chief economist at KPMG, and has served as president of the National Association for Business Economics (NABE). A member of several think tanks, including the Council on Foreign Relations, she is among the first economists to forecast various historic economic events, including the 2001 dot-com bubble, the 2007–2008 mortgage and credit crisis, and the economic impact of the COVID-19 pandemic.

== Education ==
She attended New York University, receiving a bachelor's degree in Economics and Sociology, then earned a master's degree from the School of International and Public Affairs, Columbia University (SIPA). She also holds a Certified Business Economist (CBE) designation.

== Career ==
Since the 1990s, she has held various upper-level asset management positions, serving as chief investment officer (CIO) or chief economist for over a decade prior to joining KPMG. She began her career in 1994, as an economist on foreign exchange at Chase Manhattan Bank, was subsequently a portfolio manager for Firebird Management, which invested hedge funds in countries formerly of the Soviet Union. She was chief economist at Galtere Ltd.; then managing director and chief economist at Aladdin Capital Management. In 2011, she became deputy CIO at Axa Investment Managers, with over $500 billion in managed assets. That year, she was an early forecaster of the recovery of U.S. housing markets. Hunter became known for accurately forecasting major economic events. the dot-com bubble burst of 2001; the subprime mortgage crisis that contributed to the subsequent 2008 financial crisis; low bond yields concurrent with U.S. housing market recovery, from 2012; and the effects of the COVID-19 pandemic on U.S. and international economies. She often appears as an economic commentator for broadcast media.

=== KPMG ===
In 2013, she was appointed chief economist of KPMG, where she was responsible for macroeconomic analysis and economic forecasting. A former principal of the firm, she joined its strategy leadership team in 2020, and the advisory board of its pension committee. A year after the U.S. imposed new tariffs on its trading partners, in 2018, Hunter stated that the result was that the higher tariffs were disruptive to the business environment. The following year, The Wall Street Journal noted Hunter among the first economists to officially forecast Federal Reserve rate cuts and economic recession for 2019. She was also one of the first economists to begin forecasting the extensive economic impacts of COVID-19 on the U.S., noting a March 2020 start to economic recession, emerging obstacles, such as job loss and decreased consumer consumption; mask wearing resistance; virus variants; political uncertainty; and recovery, through such as federal rate changes and social shifts, as well as the pandemic's effect on Chinese economies in February 2020. In early 2021, she forecast economic changes subsequent to societal adaptations due to the pandemic, outlined in the report, "Covid's economic reset: making the quixotic quotidian".

=== AIG ===
In early 2022, Hunter joined AIG as executive vice president, global head of strategy and environmental, social, and corporate governance (ESG). In the newly created role, her ESG responsibilities include supporting businesses as they navigate climate change, as well as meeting AIG's own net-zero by 2050 goal to match those of the Paris Agreement, and other commitments.

=== EIU ===
In September 2024, Hunter joined The Economist Intelligence Unit (EIU), the business information arm of The Economist Group as chief economist.

== Boards and associations ==
Hunter is a member of the Council on Foreign Relations, She served as president of the National Association for Business Economics for 2019 to 2020, and is a NABE Fellow and board member, where her focus is diversity and inclusion. She serves on the board of NPO GallopNYC and is a member of various economic associations, including the New York Association of Business Economics, Money Marketeers and 100 Women in Finance. Hunter also serves on the advisory board of Social Impact Capital, and the board of the National Bureau of Economic Research.
