= Ellen Hughes-Cromwick =

American economist

- Education: University of Notre Dame (BA); Clark University (MA, PhD)
- Occupation: Economist

Ellen Hughes-Cromwick is an American economic advisor serving as a senior economist at the University of Michigan Energy Institute. She previously served as the chief economist for Ford Motor Company for over 18 years, and oversaw the company through the 2008 financial crisis. Hughes-Cromwick has been involved with the National Association for Business Economics for over a decade, and served as the association's president from 2007 to 2008.

== Education ==
Hughes-Cromwick earned a Bachelor of Arts degree in Government and French Language in 1977 at the University of Notre Dame in Notre Dame, Indiana. Hughes-Cromwick then went on to complete a Master of Arts in International Development in 1988 and a Doctor of Philosophy in Economics in 1986 at Clark University in Worcester, Massachusetts.

== Career ==
=== Executive Office of the President ===
Upon completing her Ph.D. in Economics at Clark University, Hughes-Cromwick began working as a staff economist for the Reagan Administration from 1985 to 1987. During her time as a staff economist, Hughes-Cromwick worked primarily in the areas of monetary and fiscal policy and productivity growth.

=== Trinity College Hartford ===
From 1987 to 1990, Hughes-Cromwick was an assistant professor of economics at Trinity College. She taught macroeconomics courses and was awarded an IBM/Sloan Foundation grant to incorporate computer use into the classroom.

=== Mellon Bank ===
Hughes-Cromwick worked as a senior economist with Mellon Bank from 1990 to 1996 during which time she focussed on macroeconomic forecasting, Latin market studies, and healthcare economics.

=== Ford Motor Company ===
Hughes-Cromwick started as a senior economist at the Ford Motor Company in 1996. In 1999, she became a corporate economics manager and was soon promoted to director in 2002. In 2004, she was appointed chief economist of Ford. She was at the helm of seeing the company through the 2008 economic recession. During her time as Chief Economist, Ford Motor Company employed over 166,000 employees in 70 plants across the globe.

Much of the work Hughes-Cromwick did for the Ford Motor Company was researching the economic implications of Alternative Fuel Vehicles. In 2011, she presented the company's Global Electrification Strategy at the National Association for Business Economics Conference. Hughes-Cromwick emphasized Ford's 2007 "blueprint for sustainability" plan to reduce carbon dioxide emissions by 30 percent by 2020. This was to be done by developing new automobile technologies including reducing the weight of vehicles, adding hybrid electric vehicles, and employing an automatic "stop-start" mechanism in vehicles to reduce idling. The key strategy of Ford, as detailed by Hughes-Cromwick, was to provide a large variety of affordable electric and hybrid vehicles for consumers to choose from.

=== University of Michigan Ross School of Business ===
In October 2014, Hughes-Cromwick began teaching at the University of Michigan Ross School of Business. Hughes-Cromwick spent her tenure at the University of Michigan teaching graduate level economics courses and furthering her own research.

=== University of Michigan Energy Institute ===
As a Senior Economist with the Energy Institute, Hughes-Cromwick leads projects on the topics of energy, economics, policy and human behavior. Hughes-Cromwick takes part in the Transportation, Economics, Energy and the Environment conference annually.

=== U.S. Department of Commerce ===
On December 16, 2015, the States News Service reported that Penny Pritzker, the U.S. Secretary of Commerce, announced Ellen Hughes-Cromwick to be the next Chief Economist for the U.S. Department of Commerce. Hughes-Cromwick was Chief Economist at the U.S. Department of Commerce during the Obama administration and worked to develop the President's economic forecast. During her appointment as Chief Economist, Hughes-Cromwick focused on expanding trade and investment as well as improving data quality and measuring the digital economy. She worked with the Secretary of Commerce to support foreign direct investment initiatives. Her appointment as Chief Economist ended in 2017.

=== Research ===
Hughes-Cromwick's most recent publication in partnership with Julia Coronado is entitled "The Value of U.S Government Data to U.S. Business Decisions". In this paper, Hughes-Cromwick and Coronado examine the economic value of government acquired data in financial decision making. They primarily consider the automotive, energy and financial services sectors as they are affected by government data. A specific focus of this report is the new era of big data generated by private companies. Hughes-Cromwick and Coronado consider how private data interacts with government data in informing business decisions. The authors stipulate the importance of public government data being provided in addition to data acquired by private companies. Hughes-Cromwick and Coronado emphasize that the value US government data is extremely high, and even increasing in recent times as improvements in technology allow more data to become readily accessible. They argue that subsidizing government data collection is merited.

Hughes-Cromwick served as the President of the National Association for Business Economics from 2007 to 2008. As President, she presented her research on the changing economic climate at the October 6, 2008 National Association of Business Economics conference. As 2008 marked the 50th anniversary of the NABE, Hughes-Cromwick compared and contrasted the economy in 2008 and in 1958. She discussed the golden age of the 1950s and describes how the economy was booming prior to the recession of 1957–1958. She emphasized that the financial sector has become a larger portion of the US economy in the last 50 years, whereas the manufacturing sector has declined. When examining the financial situation in 2008, Hughes-Cromwick stated that financial disintermediation had benefited global economic growth in the short term but, in the context of the US housing market, severely punished consumers. She ended her presentation by stating that the key focus for the future is the challenge of determining an appropriate level of government regulation in the financial sector.

During her time at the University of Michigan Energy Institute, Hughes-Cromwick reviewed the Michael Lewis book entitled "The undoing project: a friendship that changed our minds". The book itself takes a psychological perspective on human decision making. Hughes-Cromwick further interpreted the book from an economic perspective and commented that the findings of Lewis are contrary to the current economic practice of forecasting. Hughes-Cromwick agreed with Lewis that predictions to an extreme degree of precision often ultimately prove to be false. She stresses that economists cannot precisely predict the future under uncertainty. Drawing on her own experience as the Chief Economist of Ford Motor Company from 1996 to 2014, she agrees with Lewis that it would not have been possible to provide accurate predictions relying solely on economic models and without consulting policy, financial and business experts.

While completing her Ph.D. in economics, Hughes-Cromwick conducted research concerning household energy use in Nairobi, Kenya. She exploited a household survey conducted by the Kenyan government which asked households to specify the type of energy they used for heating. The goal of the paper was to explain changes in fuel demand as a result of the price increase in petroleum in the 1970s. By looking at the effect of income changes on fuel demand, Hughes-Cromwick found that electricity consumption was income elastic, gas consumption was income inelastic, and charcoal consumption depended on charcoal appliance ownership and number of household members.

=== Media appearances ===
Hughes-Cromwick, as a Senior Economist with the University of Michigan Energy Institute, regularly attends the Transportation, Economics, Energy and Environment conference hosted by the institute. At the 2018 conference, she was a presenter on a panel on the subject of the Economics of Batteries and Electric Vehicle Charging. Hughes-Cromwick discussed that economics and technology of electrified vehicles have improved and predicted that retail pricing parity of electrified vehicles is expected within five years. She stipulated that a transition to electrified vehicles would have a large effect on reducing carbon dioxide emissions.

In 2013, Hughes-Cromwick addressed the Society of Automotive Analysts Conference as the Chief Economist of Ford Motor Company. Her presentation at this conference primarily focused on sales predictions for Ford, both in the U.S. and in Europe. She projected U.S. automotive sales growth at 2 to 2.5% in the short term. In the long term, over the next five years, she predicted sales growth at approximately 5% on average.

In 2017, Hughes-Cromwick appeared on CNBC to address the focus of the U.S. Federal Reserve before the September 2017 meeting. She discussed the current slowdown in job growth in the U.S. and tight labor market conditions. She commented that she did not see any inflationary risk and that she predicted the increase in interest rates might be less substantial than people expected.

=== Biden transition team ===
In 2020, Hughes-Cromwick was named a volunteer member of the Joe Biden presidential transition Agency Review Team to support transition efforts related to the United States Department of Commerce.

== Honors and awards ==
- Certificate for Business Economics (CBE) Designation, 2015
- Global Fellow, Global Interdependence Center
- Presidential Fellow, National Association for Business Economics
- Special Recognition for input to Ford Motor Company's Board of Directors Strategy Offsite, 2003
- Award from President Reagan for Improving Government Efficiency
- H.B. Earhart Graduate Fellow, Clark University

== Boards and associations ==
- Board of directors (2011–2015) and executive committee member, National Bureau for Economic Research
- Member, Conference of Business Economists, since 2000; chair, 2013–2014
- Global Fellow, Global Interdependence Center
- Board member, Council for Economic Education 2013–2014
- Member, Fiscal Future Committee, National Academy of Sciences, 2008–2010
- President, 2007–2008, and board member, since 2014, National Association for Business Economics (NABE)
- Member, Congressional Budget Office Advisory Panel, 2005–2007
- Member, Industrial Economists Discussion Group (Harvard)
- Board chair, Operation ABLE, 2007–2008
- Member, American Economic Association
