= National Association for Business Economics =

Professional association

- Formation: 1959
- Headquarters: Washington, D.C.
- Region served: United States
- Members: 3,000
- Executive Director: Tom Beers
- Website: http://www.nabe.com

The National Association for Business Economics (NABE) is the largest international association of applied economists, strategists, academics, and policy-makers committed to the application of economics. Founded in 1959, it is one of the member organizations of the Allied Social Science Associations. According to the association's website, "NABE's mission is to provide leadership in the use and understanding of economics.".

NABE was holding its annual conference at the Marriott World Trade Center hotel during the 9/11 attacks.

The association's membership is divided into subject-oriented subdivisions or round tables, including: financial, health economics, international, manufacturing, real estate/construction, regional/utility, small business/entrepreneurship, technology, and transfer pricing. Each round table plans and executes webinars and sessions at NABE meetings each year. NABE also has local and student chapters in many cities and much of the United States.

== Leadership ==
=== Presidents ===
Past presidents of the NABE include former Chairman of the Federal Reserve Alan Greenspan and Federal Reserve, Council of Economic Advisers and Congressional Budget Office advisor Diane C. Swonk. Since 2009, NABE's executive director has been Tom Beers, former chief economist of the Manufactured Housing Institute and economist with the National Association of Realtors and the Bureau of Labor Statistics.

Past presidents include:

Name	Term	Position
George W. McKinney Jr.	1965 – 1966	Senior vice president, Irving Trust Company
William Chartener	1967 – 1968	Chief economist, Goldman, Sachs & Co.
Alan Greenspan	1969 – 1970	Co-founder, Townsend, Greenspan & Co.
M. Kathryn Eickhoff	1980 – 1981	Executive vice president, Townsend-Greenspan & Co.
Diane C. Swonk	1999 – 2000	Chief economist, KPMG
Ellen Hughes-Cromwick	2007 – 2008	Chief economist, Ford Motor Company
Chris Varvares	2008 – 2009	President, Macroeconomic Advisers
Lynn Reaser	2009 – 2010	Chief economist, Point Loma Nazarene University
Richard L. Wobbekind	2010 – 2011	Director of business research division and associate dean for MBA and Enterprise Programs at the University of Colorado at Boulder
Gene Huang	2011 – 2012	Vice president & chief economist, FedEx
Ken Simonson	2012 – 2013	Chief economist, Associated General Contractors of America
Jack Kleinhenx	2013 – 2014	Chief economist, National Retail Federation
John Silvia	2014 – 2015	Managing director and chief economist, Wells Fargo
Lisa Emsbo-Mattingly	2015 – 2016	Research director, asset allocation, Fidelity Investments
Stuart P. M. Mackintosh	2016 – 2017	Executive director, Group of Thirty
Mine Yucel	2017 – 2018	Senior vice president and research director, Federal Reserve Bank of Dallas
Kevin Swift	2018 – 2019	Chief economist, American Chemistry Council
Constance Hunter	2019 – 2020	Chief economist, AIG and, formerly, KPMG
Manuel Balmaseda	2020 – 2021	Chief economist, CEMEX; adjunct professor, IE University
David E. Altig	2021 – 2022	Executive vice president and director of research, Federal Reserve Bank of Atlanta
Julia Coronado	2022 – 2023	President and Founder, MacroPolicy Perspectives LLC

== Activities ==
- NABE Annual Meeting: The NABE Annual Meeting features speakers, panel discussions, educational sessions, and networking opportunities. In addition to NABE Members and those in related fields, attendees include business leaders, government officials, analysts, investors, and members of the business media.
- Economic Policy Conference: Held annually in the spring in Washington, DC, focuses "on the one seemingly-unpredictable variable that regularly confounds many economists and their models: economic policy". Speakers at the Economic Policy Conference typically include leaders from the Federal Reserve Board, Treasury Department, Congressional Budget Office, Federal Deposit Insurance Corporation, and other government agencies, in addition to analysts at think tanks and other institutions.
- Webinars/Teleconferences: Each of the ten NABE Roundtables conducts regular webinars and teleconferences on topics within its area of interest. These sessions are available to both members and non-members.
- Publications: NABE offers a variety of publications. Business Economics, its journal - as below - is best known of these.
- NABE Surveys: NABE regularly conducts three surveys of its membership: the Outlook Survey, the Industry Survey, and the Economic Policy Survey. The NABE Outlook Survey, the most well-known of the NABE surveys, provides the consensus forecast of NABE’s professional economic forecasters.

== Education and career development ==
- Certified Business Economist: NABE offers continuing education through its Certified Business Economist program which features a comprehensive exam developed and administered by the association. Candidates must have at least a four-year degree, and two years of work experience in applied business economics or in a related field.
- Econometrics Certificate Programs: Offered twice yearly at Federal Reserve Banks, NABE's Econometrics Seminars are among its offerings. Each Summer, NABE offers the Certificate in Applied Econometrics, and each Fall, the Certificate in Time-Series Analysis and Forecasting.
- NABE career site: caters to those seeking a job or an employee in the field of economics.
- No accreditation appears to exists for their educational products or services.

== Journal publication ==
NABE is the publisher of Business Economics, a scholarly journal that covers different aspects of applied economics and is published quarterly. The journal serves as an essential resource and provides practical information for people who apply economics in the workplace. It is the leading forum for debating solutions to critical business problems, analyzing key business and economic issues, and sharing of best-practice models, tools, and hands-on techniques from practitioners in the field of economics.

== Adam Smith Award ==
Since 1982, NABE has awarded the Adam Smith Award to prominent economists and policy makers who have contributed to business economics. Recipients of the award include former Federal Reserve chairman Ben Bernanke, in 2014; CEO and president of TIAA-CREF Roger Ferguson, in 2013; vice chair of the Board of Governors of the Federal Reserve System Janet Yellen, in 2010; former director of the National Economic Council Lawrence Summers in 2009, chief executive of the Federal Reserve Bank of St. Louis William Poole, in 2006; Princeton University economics professor Paul Krugman, in 1995; and Chicago School economist and recipient of the Nobel Prize in Economics Milton Friedman in 1989.

== Paul A. Volcker Lifetime Achievement Award for Economic Policy ==
Each March, NABE presents the Paul A. Volcker Award to a senior policymaker recognizing outstanding contributions to the field of economic and monetary policy in his or her career. Past recipients include:

Year	NABE
2013	Paul A. Volcker
2014	Jean-Claude Trichet
2015	Alice Rivlin
2016	Stanley Fischer
2017	Joseph Stiglitz
2018	Mervyn King
2019	Alan Greenspan
2020	Roger Ferguson

== See also ==
- List of economics awards
