= Diane Swonk =

American economist

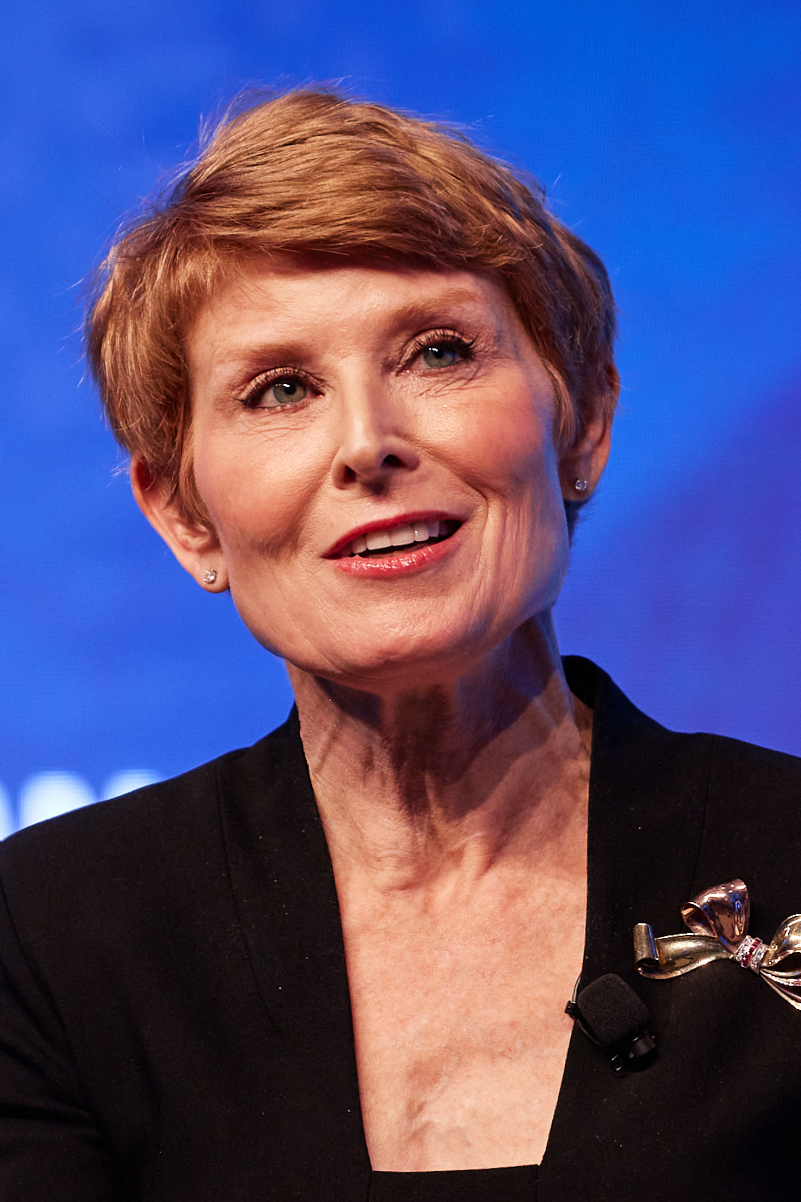
- Swonk in 2023
- Born: April 8, 1962; Kalamazoo, Michigan, US

Academic background
- Education: University of Michigan (BA, MA); University of Chicago (MBA)
- Website: www.kpmg.us/DianeSwonk

Diane C. Swonk (born April 8, 1962) is an American economic advisor and chief economist at KPMG US.

== Early life and education ==
Swonk was born in Kalamazoo, Michigan. She studied economics at the University of Michigan, where she obtained a bachelor's degree in 1984, followed by a master's degree, in 1985. She also holds an MBA in finance from the Booth School of Business at the University of Chicago. She is dyslexic, and has spoken publicly on how she considers this to have affected her work.

== Career ==
Swonk started her career at the age of 22 when she joined First Chicago Corporation in 1985 as an associate economist. Despite encounters with workplace gender discrimination, by the turn of the century, Swonk became "widely regarded as one of the premier forecasters of the U.S. economy". The bank later merged with Banc One Corporation to become Bank One. Swonk rose to become director of Economics and senior vice president, prior to leaving the firm in 2004.

Lodged at a nearby New York Marriott World Trade Center hotel to attend an annual National Association for Business Economics (NABE) conference at the time; her economic focus shifted from pure numeracy following the events of 9/11, as she then ascertained economics to be equally influenced by social as by financial policy. Swonk joined the faculty of Kellstadt Graduate School of Business at DePaul University, as a clinical professor of finance that year.

In November 2004, Swonk was appointed chief economist and senior managing director at Mesirow Financial. She spent 11 years at the firm, before leaving in 2016 to found her private consulting firm, DS Economics, where she is CEO.

Swonk was appointed chief economist of Grant Thornton, LLP in January 2018. In July 2022, KPMG US appointed her as its chief economist.

Swonk is a Fellow of the NABE, and was its president from 1999 to 2000. Swonk is also a member of the Council on Foreign Relations.

== Works ==
- The Passionate Economist: Finding the Power and Humanity Behind the Numbers (2003)
- The Economic Outlook and Undercurrents in the Consumer Credit Market (1997)
- The Great Lakes Economy Revisited Federal Reserve Bank of Chicago (1996)
