= Ben Schechter =

American artist and investor (born 1980)

- Born: August 26, 1980 (age 45)
- Movement: Internet Art
- Website: http://www.weirddays.com

Ben Schechter (born August 26, 1980) is an American artist and filmmaker best known as a partner in Directors Collective Weird Days. He is now based in Los Angeles.

== Career ==
Ben Schechter established Weird Days with Alex Goldberg and Drew Blatman in 2007. They gained notoriety for their work with Riff Raff, Santigold, Das Racist, Tanlines. and Real Estate. Schechter has directed commercials for MySpace, Nike, Converse, and Levi's.

== Ben's Books ==
Schechter ran a small independent book store in Williamsburg, Brooklyn. It has since closed.
