= Relly Raffman =

Composer and professor of music at Clark University

Relly Raffman (1921–1988) was a composer and professor of music at Clark University in Worcester, Massachusetts.

== Early biography ==
Raffman was born in New Bedford, Massachusetts, September 4, 1921. He entered Dartmouth College in 1939, by which time he had been performing as a jazz pianist for several years. At Dartmouth, he was pianist, arranger, leader, singer, and saxophonist of the Barbary Coast Orchestra. His Dartmouth education was interrupted by four years in the U.S. Navy in World War II, during which he had a distinguished career as a carrier pilot, flying more than 75 missions and receiving the Distinguished Flying Cross and three Air Medals.

== Jazz performance ==
After receiving his Dartmouth B.A. in 1947, he formed the Relly Raffman Trio and was active in the lively jazz scene of the southeastern Massachusetts area. His jazz activities expanded to New York City while he was at Columbia University earning his Master's Degree.

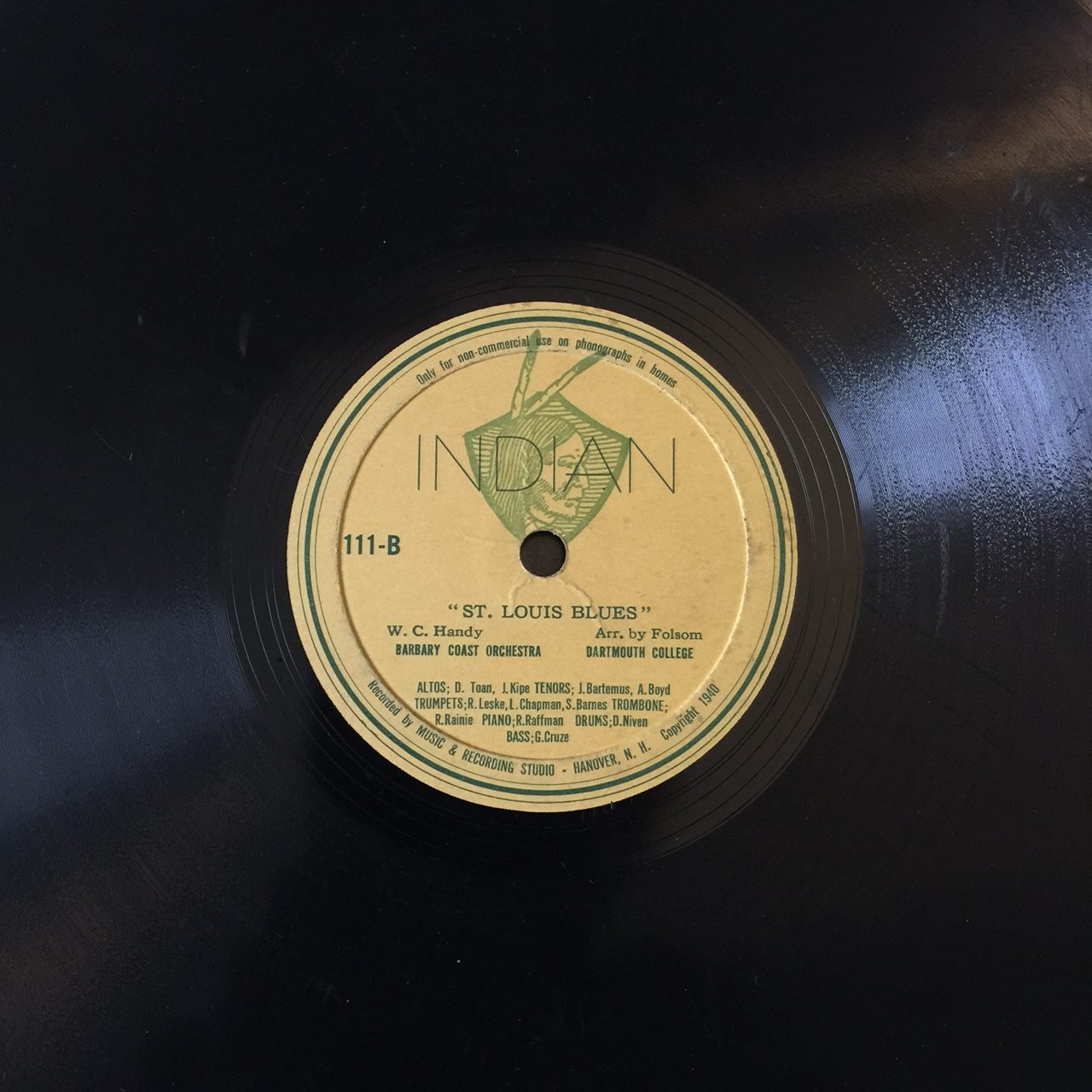
Recording by the Barbary Coast Orchestra of Dartmouth College, featuring Relly Raffman

== Compositional study ==
When, in 1950, Raffman arrived at Indiana University to begin work on a Ph.D. in theory and composition with Bernard Heiden, he was doing a complete flip-flop, as he later described it, from jazz to "serious" music. However, it was a flip-flop that integrated jazz into the serious music he would write; and, as described below, Raffman continued playing and writing jazz in later years, even as he delved into other areas of composition. Raffman also studied with John Cage during this period.

== Academic career ==
Raffman's career was interrupted by military service a second time, during the Korean War. After serving three years as a flight instructor, Raffman returned to civilian life and joined the faculty at Clark University (Worcester, Massachusetts) in 1954, established the Music Department, and served as its first chair. From 1972-1977, he was the chairman of both the Music Department and of the newly created Department of Visual and Performing Arts. In 1966 he had been named the first Jeppson Professor of Music, a position he held to the time of his death in 1988. In that capacity, he taught courses in music history and theory. His main interest was 20th-century music; in particular, that of Debussy, Ravel, Stravinsky, and Bartók. In teaching theory, he placed particular emphasis on the concept of scalar control, as exemplified in the music of 20th-century classical and jazz composers.

During his 34 years at Clark, in addition to teaching history and theory, he was, at various times, conductor of the Chorus and the Madrigal Group, and he conducted several opera performances. In 1971, he inaugurated the Jazz Studies program and organized the Jazz Workshop, writing many big-band arrangements for the group. Raffman's arrangements were tailored to the strengths of the individual musicians in the band, which was composed of Clark students and outside musicians from the Worcester area. The works included original jazz compositions and arrangements of the work of other songwriters. In addition, Raffman wrote arrangements for a vocal group that sang with the Jazz Workshop; this group was generally made up of four singers but sometimes grew to as many as 12, when they were known as "the Dodecaphonics."

== Compositional output ==
Relly Raffman had fourteen published compositions and thirteen in manuscript; among the latter are a cantata, a musical, a one-act opera, "Midas," which parodied President Lyndon Johnson, and chamber music for various combination. His last commission, "Fur Eliot," was dedicated to guitarist Eliot Fisk, who worked closely with the composer in adapting the work to the guitar. Raffman had written the music in piano notation and in a register appropriate for the piano but with the intention that it be played on the guitar. Fisk made a number of suggestions "that turned it into a true guitar piece," as he explained. Fisk has made two recordings of the work.
