= Stuart P. M. Mackintosh =

British economist and financial author

Stuart P.M. Mackintosh is a British economist and financial author who was formerly the Executive Director of the Group of Thirty, an international financial think tank. He oversees the Group's program of studies, project development, event planning and annual fundraising.

== Books ==
- Climate Crisis Economics: A Race of Tipping Points. April 2025 (Paperback, Hardback, and E-book).
- Creating the National Bank of Scotland and the Scottish Pound: Establishing an Institutional Pathway and a Timeline for Success. May 2022 (Paperback and E-book).
- Climate Crisis Economics. Routledge. September 2021 (Paperback, Hardback, open access). Chinese edition forthcoming in 2022.
- Redesign of the Global Financial Architecture: State Authority, New Risks, and Dynamics. Taylor Francis/Routledge. Second Edition, forthcoming, 2020.
- The Redesign of the Global Financial Architecture (in paperback). Taylor and Francis/Routledge, 2017

== Articles ==
- The tech bros' rush for riches is foolish, shocking, and dangerous The Herald, April 23, 2024.
- After climate tipping points, change will come slowly, then all at once. The Hill, April 11. 2024.
- Why richer, older China needs a change in the social contract, South China Morning Post. April 9, 2024.
- China Ramps Up Green Spending. Project Syndicate, March 27, 2024.
- Keir Starmer's austerity-lite will not deliver economic growth, The national February 19, 2024.
- China must shield the rest of its economy from property contagion South China Morning post, February 9, 2024.
- To revive confidence in China’s economy, clear and reliable data is essential South China Morning Post, December 17, 2023.
- Central banks should get back to basics, The Herald, December 4, 2023.
- King's speech to a troubled UK 8 November 2023.
- Culture as culprit, culture as cure. The Banker. September 15, 2023.
- The US sees an epochal shift: A smart Britain would be following suit The National, August 28, 2023.
- China should learn from America’s past mistakes to save its economy South China Morning Post, August 23, 2023.
- We need better strategies as we approach climate change breaking point The Hill, August 22, 2023.
- China should use its sway to push Russia to negotiate with Ukraine South China Morning Post, July 26, 2023, with Bill Rhodes.
- As the planet bakes, political agendas stall progress on climate change The Hill, July 22, 2023.
- Insurers are fleeing the states due to climate realities, note due to "anti-woke' bullies The Hill, June 2, 2023.
- How China can learn from mistakes in US banking oversight South China Morning Post, April 26, 2023, with Bill Rhodes.
- Who is to blame for the US banking crisis? Project Syndicate, March 16, 2023, with Bill Rhodes.
- The right is wrong ESG investing did not create the US banking crisis . The Hill March 21, 2023.
- Time for China to use influence with Putin to push for peace South China Morning Post, March 1, 2023, with Bill Rhodes.
- Climate change has its tipping points - thankfully so does progress The Hill February 21, 2023.
- China must look beyond short-term recovery to spur growth South China Morning Post, January 28, 2023, with Bill Rhodes.
- Debt fixes can help rebuild Ukraine Reuters GuestView, January 11, 2023, with Bill Rhodes.
- The right and the wrong way to protect endangered species The Hill January 11, 2023.
- How will Joe Biden's America impact on Scotland and Europe?. The National, December 16, 2022.
- Climate anxiety isn’t the enemy: Embracing it can speed change. The Hill. December 8, 2022.
- Decline of globalization with make world less prosperous and more unlivable. South China Morning Post, November 14, 2022, with Bill Rhodes.
- Without regulation, we’ll never know if carbon offsets reduce emissions. The Hill, October 22, 2022.
- Economic plan for independent Scotland offers stability over disarray. The National, October 18, 2022.
- Scotland's tax differences from England can be a strength, not a liability. The Glasgow Herald, October 11, 2022, with Bill Rhodes.
- Russia Sanctions Lack Decisive Punch. Reuters Guestveiw. September 27, 2022, with Bill Rhodes.
- This Labor Day Honor the Fundamentals of Fairness September 5, The Hill.
- Avoiding the pain of China’s housing crisis risks infecting the wider economy, August 17, 2022. South China Morning Post.
- Biden’s green triumph: What a difference a month makes August 17, 2022. The Hill.
- Global food crisis demands urgent western response Reuters, July 25, 2022.
- Global citizens: We may have to sue our way out of the climate crisis. The Hill July 25, 2022.
- Does the G20 have a Future? July 13, 2022. Project Syndicate.
- Don’t let SCOTUS undo decades of progress on climate change July 3, 2022. The Hill.
- The quiet of a country walk is nature’s silent scream May 19, 2022. The Hill.
- Op-ed - the four big threats to China's economy. CNBC, with Bill Rhodes, April 27, 2022.
- Climate change that happened gradually is accelerating suddenly The Hill, March 31, 2022.
- Time to Charge the Real Cost for Polluting Energy Intelligence, February 15, 2022.
- Climate change is no longer a probability - it's time to face reality. The Hill, February 12, 2022.
- Technocrats and Traffic Lights: the Franco-German Alliance and the Direction of Europe EuropeNow, February 2022.
- Fed Hike Spells Emerging Market Strain Reuters. February 4, 2022.
- Banks and the Green Leap Forward Project Syndicate. January 25, 2022.
- To Save the Planet Build Back Better Must be Salvaged The Hill, January 5, 2022.
- COP26 was a Cop-out: Why it gets a failing grade The Hill, November 18, 2021.
- Warning Signs of a 'Volcker Moment.'. June 14, Reuters, with Willian R. Rhodes.
- Threats to Recovery Co-Authored with Bill Rhodes. March 3. Project Syndicate.
- Make America Green Again. Financial World Magazine, February 2021.
- State support for COVID-hit companies has to change - Raghuram Rajan and Stuart Mackintosh Financial Times, November 2020.
- The Great British Kakistocracy. EuropeNow. November 20, 2020.
- Debt Crisis Will Delay Recovery Reuters Breaking Views, May 26. 2020.
- Come Together. Reuters Guest Views, April 7, 2020
- Climate change and the central banking: A policy revolution under way, World Economics Journal, October–December, 2019.
- Turbulent times ahead for the American economy. Financial World Magazine. December 2019.
- Fairytales, Brexit Halloween Nightmares, and the Birth of Little England EuropeNow, July 2019.
- Volcker and de Larosiere: The end of giants? Book Review. Business Economics Journal, May 2019.
- America First and the end of pax Americana Europe Now Journal, November 2, 2018.
- Data, Deceit, and the Defense of Truth. World Economics, July–September 2018.
- Tough Talk on Trade, a review of Rodrik, D (2017). Book review, in Business Economics, October 2018
- Will America First trump international cooperation and coordination, in World Economics, December 2017;
- The Trumpian Regulatory Landscape, Financial World Magazine, forthcoming.
- The banks’ Trump card, Financial World Magazine, February–March 2017.
- Doing It The Hard Way, Financial World Magazine, December 2016-January 2017, pp-27-28.
- A gathering storm, Financial World Magazine, October–November 2016 pp 16–17.
- The Creation of the Asian Infrastructure and Investment Bank: America’s Loss and China’s Gain, World Economics, July–September 2016;
- Why Dull Banks Are Delightful, Financial World Magazine, June/July 2016, pp56–59.
- The UK's Nativist Nationalism, published in 2016, on the dynamics behind the campaign for the UK to leave the European Union;
- Making the Jump: How crises Affect Policy Consensus and Can Trigger Paradigm Shift, 2016, a paper that formed part of a UNEP work stream on Climate Change and Green Finance;
- Crises and Paradigm Shift: A Response to Critics, Political Quarterly, 2015.
- Crises and Paradigm Shift, Political Quarterly, 2014. The article stirred some debate, with direct rebuttals from Prof. Mugge - Policy Inertia and the Persistence of Systemic Fragility; and from Tsingou - The Club Rules in Financial Governance, both published in 2015.
- The Global Financial and Economic Crisis and the Creation of the Financial Stability Board, 2014, published in Journal of World Economics;
- Mackintosh published The Redesign of the Global Financial Architecture: The Return of State Authority in November 2015 with Routledge.
- Ph.D. thesis The Redesign of the Global Financial Architecture: Forums, Institutions, and State Power (2014).

== Professional roles ==
Mackintosh became Vice President of the National Association for Business Economics (NABE) in October 2015 NABE Board, and in June 2016 he was elected as the 2016-2017 President of NABE.

Mackintosh delivered his NABE presidential address on September 23, 2017 in Cleveland Ohio, at the organization's annual conference. In it he said NABE members had to be 'ready to defend truth'. The speech was titled 'Business Economics in a Post-Truth Era', and was published in the Business Economics Journal.

Mackintosh is a past Director of the NABE Foundation. He serves on the advisory boards of the Official Monetary and Financial Institutions Forum, and the World Affairs Council. Mackintosh was elected a member of the Conference of Business Economists, an invitation-only organization of economists in the United States, in 2014.
