= Metro Inns =

British budget hotel company

Logo

Metro Inns is a British budget hotel company established in 2006 and headquartered in Newcastle upon Tyne. As of 2024, the chain operates six hotels in England, Scotland and Northern Ireland.

== History ==
In 2012 the company branched out to Northern Ireland with the purchase of the Lansdowne Hotel for £700,000. In early 2013 it acquired a number of hotels from Travelodge. By May 2013 the company announced that several of its hotels were for sale after being placed in administration.
