= Marc Lasry =

American hedge fund manager

- Born: Marrakesh, Morocco
- Education: Clark University (BA); New York Law School (JD)
- Occupations: Private equity investor Hedge fund manager
- Known for: Co-founder of Avenue Capital Group, and co-owner of the Milwaukee Bucks
- Spouse: Cathy Cohen
- Children: 5, including Alex
- Family: Sonia Gardner (sister)

Marc Lasry is a Moroccan American billionaire businessman and private equity manager. He is the co-founder and chief executive officer (CEO) of Avenue Capital Group. He was a co-owner of the NBA's Milwaukee Bucks basketball team from 2014 to 2023.

== Early life and education ==
Lasry was born in to a Jewish family in Marrakesh, Morocco. When he was seven years old, he and his family immigrated to the U.S., right before the outbreak of the Six Day War in 1967. His father, Moise, was a computer programmer and his mother, Elise, was a schoolteacher. Lasry grew up in West Hartford, Connecticut, and received a B.A. in history from Clark University in 1981 and a J.D. from New York Law School in 1984. While in law school, he worked as a clerk for the Chief Bankruptcy Judge of the Southern District of New York, Edward Ryan.

== Career ==
After graduating from law school, Lasry took a position in the bankruptcy branch of the law firm Angel & Frankel. Together with his sister Sonia Gardner, an attorney, they founded Amroc Investments in 1989 and Avenue Capital Group in 1995. One year later Lasry became the Director of the Private Debt Department at the investment firm R. D. Smith, now Smith Vasillou Management. This is where Lasry first got involved in trade claims. He then took a position as co-director of the Bankruptcy and Corporate Reorganization Department at Cowen & Company. There Lasry recruited his sister Sonia to assist in the company's trade claims department. Lasry left Cowen & Company and joined the Robert M. Bass Group, focused on distressed security investments.

In 1989, Lasry and his sister founded the firm Amroc Investments with $100 million in seed money from various investors. Amroc purchased both trade claims and bank debt held by vendors of bankrupt and/or distressed companies. In 1995, Lasry and Gardner invested $7 million of their own capital and founded the Avenue Capital Group, which initially focused on distressed debt and special situations primarily in the United States, including getting involved in Puerto Rican government-debt crisis. The partners successfully expanded the firm's investment focus to Europe and Asia. The two went on to build their hedge fund, which had as much as $11 billion in assets under management.

In 2010, Lasry also took control of Trump Entertainment Resorts as it went through its third bankruptcy. In October 2011, Lasry and Donald Trump announced plans to set up an online gambling venture if and when the United States legalizes such betting. On January 12, 2013, when the reorganization of Trump Entertainment had made marked progress, Lasry resigned as the casino company's chairman of the board.

In 2013, Lasry was considered for the position of U.S. ambassador to France, but declined consideration for business reasons. In 2014 Forbes listed Lasry as one of the 25 highest-earning hedge fund managers in 2013, with total earnings of $280 million.

In April 2014, Lasry became co-owner of the NBA's Milwaukee Bucks after purchasing the team from Herb Kohl for $550 million with Wes Edens. Following the 2016 U.S. election, Lasry and the Milwaukee Bucks became one of three NBA teams to openly state they would not be staying at Trump branded hotels when on the road.

In 2021, Lasry stepped down as the chair of Ozy Media. He also touted about investing in China, saying "Now is a great time to be investing in China"

Lasry is the largest shareholder of Amplify Energy, an energy company responsible for an October 2021 oil spill in Orange County, California. Amplify was charged by a federal grand jury in December 2021 for criminal negligence in connection with their role in the oil spill. The 25,000-gallon oil spill was “in a quantity that may be harmful to the public health, welfare and environment of the United States,”

In 2023, Lasry entered an agreement to sell his 25% stake of the Bucks to Dee and Jimmy Haslam. The NBA Board of Governors approved the sale on April 14, 2023. The following month Lasry announced a women's sports investment fund, Avenue Sports Fund, at SALT's New York iConnections conference. The fund is an investor in The Bay Golf Club of the TGL alongside Stephen Curry, Andre Iguodala, and Klay Thompson.

In September 2026, Lasry and Steve Apostolopoulos are narrowed down to three group finalist for the NBA potential Las Vegas expansion, along with a joint bid by Bill and Nancy Walton Laurie; and a joint bid by Bill Foley and Jerry Colangelo. However they dropped out on October 23, 2026.

== Philanthropy ==
In 2004, Lasry and his wife contributed support to the University of Pennsylvania and co-chaired the Penn Parent Leadership Committee. In 2005 they donated $5 million to Clark University for the construction of the "Cathy '83 and Marc '81 Lasry Center for Bioscience".

Lasry served as a director of the 92nd Street Y and the Big Apple Circus and was a trustee of the Mount Sinai Hospital in Manhattan.

In January 2016 Lasry participated in "Portfolios with Purpose," an annual stock selection contest in which participants pick portfolios on behalf of their favorite charities.

In October 2017, Lasry, Dirk Ziff and Tim Sarnoff resigned from The Weinstein Company's board following the publication of a New York Times investigation into the claims against Mr. Weinstein.

== Personal life ==
Lasry is married to Cathy Cohen and they have five children. The family continues to practice some of the distinctive customs of the Moroccan Jewish community. Their son, Alex, worked for White House senior adviser Valerie Jarrett and was a candidate for the United States Senate in 2022. Their daughter, Samantha, was a staffer for congressman Rahm Emanuel.

Lasry is a member of Kappa Beta Phi.

Lasry is a major Democratic Party donor while considering a Democratic sweep in election "bad for stocks". He backed Kamala Harris in the 2020 Democratic presidential primary, stating that he "would like to have somebody who's in the middle" as the party's candidate.

Lasry was a board member of the 92nd Street Y.

In 2019, Lasry played on the "Away" roster during the NBA All-Star Celebrity Game at the Bojangles Coliseum in Charlotte, North Carolina.

Sporting positions
Preceded by Herb Kohl	Milwaukee Bucks principal owner 2014–2023; Served alongside: Wes Edens	Succeeded by Jamie Dinan; Jimmy Haslam
