= Sonia Gardner =

American businesswoman (born 1962)

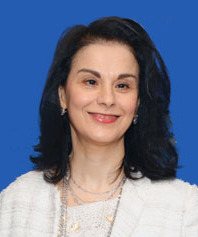
- Born: Sonia Esther Lasry; 16 February 1962 (age 64); Marrakesh, Morocco
- Education: Clark University; Cardozo School of Law
- Occupation: Hedge fund manager
- Known for: Co-founder of Avenue Capital Group
- Spouse: Alan Gardner
- Children: 1
- Relatives: Marc Lasry (brother)

Sonia Gardner (born 16 February 1962) is an American businesswoman, hedge fund manager and the co-founder of Avenue Capital Group.

== Early life and education ==
Sonia Gardner was born Sonia Esther Lasry to a Jewish family in Marrakesh, Morocco. She immigrated with her family to the U.S. in 1966 at the age of four. Her father was a computer programmer and her mother a schoolteacher. She was raised in West Hartford, Connecticut with her brother Marc Lasry and sister Ruth Lasry. Gardner earned a B.A. in philosophy from Clark University in 1983 and a J.D. from Cardozo School of Law in 1986.

== Career ==
Gardner began her career as senior attorney of the bankruptcy and corporate reorganization department at Cowen and Company. In 1989, Gardner and her brother, Marc, founded the debt brokerage firm Amroc Investments. In 1990, Gardner and her brother began a debt brokerage firm with Gardner as Senior Portfolio Manager. Gardner and her brother formed Avenue Capital Group in 1995.

In 2008, Gardner was the recipient of the 100 Women in Hedge Funds' 2008 Industry Leadership Award. In 2010 and 2011, The Hedge Fund Journal included her in their list of the Top 50 Women in Hedge Funds. In January 2011 Gardner rang the stock market's closing bell in celebration of the tenth anniversary of "100 Women in Hedge Funds." In 2012, Gardner was listed in the book, The Alpha Masters: Unlocking the Genius of the World's Top Hedge Funds. In March 2013, Business Insider included her in their list of the 25 most powerful women on Wall Street. Gardner rang the closing bell at the NYSE on 25 August 2015, on behalf of "100 Women in Hedge Funds." In December 2015, the 100 Women in Hedge Funds announced the election of the new Global Association Board Leadership for 2016 which includes the election of their new chair, Gardner.

She is the United Nations Capital Development Fund (UNCDF), Goodwill Ambassador for Gender Equality in Access to Finance. In her role, she will focus on advocating ways to give women access to economic resources to start and grow businesses, lift their families out of poverty, and help achieve the Sustainable Development Goals.

Gardner is on the board of directors of 100 Women in Hedge Funds. She is also a member of the board of trustees of the Mount Sinai Medical Center. Gardner was previously on the board of the non-profit organization "Her Justice," which helps victims of domestic violence. She was also on the board of directors of the Managed Funds Association (MFA) and on its executive committee.
