= Group of Thirty =

Consultative group on international economic and monetary affairs

- Consultative Group on International Economic and Monetary Affairs, Inc.
- Established: 1978; 47 years ago
- Chair: Vacant
- Executive Director: Stuart P. M. Mackintosh
- Staff: 4
- Budget: $448k (FY07)
- Members: 30
- Address: 1701 K Street, NW, Suite 950 Washington, DC 20006 USA
- Location: Washington, D.C.
- Website: www.group30.org

The Group of Thirty, often abbreviated to G30, is an international body of financiers and academics which aims to deepen understanding of economic and financial issues and to examine consequences of decisions made in the public and private sectors. Areas within the interest of the group include: the foreign exchange market, international capital markets, international financial institutions, central banks and their supervision of financial services and markets, and macroeconomic issues such as product and labor markets.

The group is noted for its advocacy of changes in global clearing and settlement.

== History ==
The Group of Thirty was founded in 1978 by Geoffrey Bell at the initiative of the Rockefeller Foundation, which also provided initial funding for the body. Its first chairman was Johannes Witteveen, the former managing director of the International Monetary Fund. Mark Carney was the recent Chair before stepping down in January 2025 to run for election in Canada. The current Chair of the Board of Trustees is Tharman Shanmugaratnam.

The Bellagio Group, formed by Austrian economist Fritz Machlup, was the immediate predecessor to the Group of Thirty. It first met in 1963, at the Rockefeller Foundation Center (Villa Serbelloni) in Bellagio, to investigate international currency problems, particularly the balance of payments crisis which America faced throughout the early 1960s.

In June 2011, the group released a report that examines the 2008 financial crisis, including the causes, the responses and the future outlook for the United States and other markets.

In January 2018, the European Ombudsman Emily O'Reilly requested that ECB President Mario Draghi resign from the group because his membership in the organization could be interpreted as undue influence.

== Members ==
The group consists of thirty members and includes the heads of major private banks and central banks, as well as members from academia and international institutions. Current members of the group include current and former heads of the central banks of Argentina, Australia, Brazil, Canada, China, France, Germany, India, Israel, Italy, Japan, Mexico, Nigeria, Poland, Singapore, Spain, Switzerland, the United Kingdom, and the United States as well as two presidents of the Federal Reserve Bank of New York, two presidents of the European Central Bank, a chairman of the Basel Committee on Banking Supervision, two chairmen of the Bank for International Settlements, two chief economists of the International Monetary Fund, a chief economist of the World Bank, and the former president of Mexico. It holds two full meetings each year and also organises seminars, symposia, and study groups. It is based in Washington, D.C.
