= Avenue Capital Group =

American multinational investment firm

Avenue Capital Group, LLC
- Company type: Limited liability company
- Industry: Private Equity, Distressed securities
- Founded: 1995; 31 years ago
- Founder: Marc Lasry, Sonia Gardner
- Headquarters: 399 Park Avenue, New York City, New York, U.S.
- Area served: Worldwide
- Products: Private equity funds, Hedge funds
- AUM: $12.6 billion (October 2022)
- Number of employees: 220
- Website: avenuecapital.com

Avenue Capital Group is an American multinational investment firm focusing on distressed securities and private equity with regional teams focusing on opportunities in the United States, Europe and Asia. The firm operates as both a private equity firm and as a hedge fund. Avenue's core strategy is focused on distressed debt and equity securities although the firm also manages investment funds that focus on long-short opportunities, real estate, and collateralized debt obligations. The firm manages assets valued at approximately $9.5 billion. The firm was founded by former professionals of Amroc Investments, an affiliate of the Robert M. Bass Group.

The firm is headquartered in New York City, with offices in London, Luxembourg, Munich, Beijing, Hong Kong, New Delhi and Singapore. The firm has established an institutional-quality infrastructure in terms of accounting, compliance legal, investor relations, and information technology capabilities. Avenue has approximately 220 employees across its 8 offices worldwide.

Avenue's investment professionals seek "good companies with bad balance sheets" — firms with sustainable businesses and positive cash flow but whose financial situation is distressed. The investment team uses Avenue's top-down/bottom-up approach to find undervalued opportunities and typically seeks to make non-operational control investments in troubled businesses. This provides the strategy maximum trading flexibility and allows Avenue's investment professionals to focus on pre-investment research and analysis rather than post-investment operating issues.

From 2006 to 2009, Chelsea Clinton, daughter of former President of the United States Bill Clinton and former Secretary of State Hillary Clinton, worked as an associate at Avenue Capital Group LLC.

Bloomberg reported that as of February 28, 2010, Avenue Capital Group is the 13th largest hedge fund in the world.

== History ==
Avenue Capital Group was founded in 1995 by siblings Marc Lasry and Sonia Gardner. The two founders had previously founded Amroc Investments in 1989 as a $100 million distressed debt investment fund organized in association with the Robert M. Bass Group.

In 1995, Mr. Lasry and Ms. Gardner started their first Avenue fund, Avenue Investments, with less than $10 million. This onshore fund has grown to $509 million as of December 31, 2012.

In 1997, Mr. Lasry and Ms. Gardner formed their second Avenue fund called Avenue International. This offshore fund attracts U.S. tax-exempt and non-U.S. investors. As of December 31, 2012, Avenue International has $1,461 million in assets under management.

In 2012, The firm was featured in Maneet Ahuja's book, The Alpha Masters: Unlocking the Genius of the World's Top Hedge Funds.

In February, 2016 Marc Lasry explained on CNBC that Avenue Capital was taking advantage of the opportunity to purchase loans from European Banks at a discount. As Lasry said: "Most banks are being forced by the European Central Bank to sell loans and therefore we're able to buy those loans at a great discount. The ECB will likely continue to put pressure on these banks to clean up their balance sheet."

In August 2018, it was announced Avenue Capital has invested €250million ($278 million) in Castlehaven Finance, an Irish construction sector lending platform.

In March 2021, Avenue signed an agreement with Indian economy airline SpiceJet to accommodate the financing, sale & leaseback of fifty new airplanes.

In November 2023, Avenue Capital Group launched its Avenue Sports Fund, which provides equity and capital to sports teams and league, primarily in US and Europe. In September 2025, the fund closed after raising over $1billion in commitments.

Since its inception in 1995, Avenue has raised 14 private equity style investment funds across its three principal regions (US, Europe and Asia) to invest in distressed securities and real estate:

=== United States ===
- 1998 - Avenue Special Situations I - $133 million
- 2001 - Avenue Special Situations II - $520 million
- 2003 - Avenue Special Situations III - $628 million
- 2006 - Avenue Special Situations IV - $1.68 billion
- 2007 - Avenue Real Estate Fund - $166 million
- 2007 - Avenue Special Situations V - $6.0 billion
- 2011 - Avenue Special Situations Fund VI - $1.9 billion
- 2014 - Avenue Energy Opportunities Fund - $1.3 billion
- 2023 - Avenue Sports Fund - $1 billion

=== Asia ===
- 2001 - Avenue Asia Capital Partners - $126 million
- 2001 - Avenue Asia Special Situations II - $275 million
- 2003 - Avenue Asia Special Situations III - $628 million
- 2006 - Avenue Asia Special Situations Fund IV - $3.0 billion

=== Europe ===
- 2008 - Avenue Europe Special Situations Fund - €1.5 billion
- 2012 - Avenue Europe Special Situations Fund II – $2.78 billion

Avenue launched its Asian-focused distressed business in 1999. In 2004, Avenue launched its European-focused distressed business with Rich Furst as the senior portfolio manager. While building distressed debt, the European branch of the firm also writes loans for small companies that are unable to obtain financing.

== Ownership ==
In October 2006, Morgan Stanley bought a non-controlling 15% stake in the firm. Marc Lasry and Sonia Gardner invested 100% of the proceeds they received from Morgan Stanley back into the Avenue funds.

== Corporate responsibility ==
In 2014, Avenue Capital Group raised over $68,000 for HerJustice, a New York-based organisation devoted to ending domestic violence. Avenue Capital Group served as a sponsor in 2010 and 2011 and, in July 2012 Avenue's President, Sonia Gardner, hosted a breakfast on inMotion's behalf to encourage other firms to participate. Ms Gardner was again honored in 2014 at the Annual Photography Auction & Benefit for Her Justice.

In January 2016 Marc Lasry participated in "Portfolios with Purpose", in which participants compete on behalf of their favorite charities.

In April 2018 the firm was reported to be launching a $500 million fund focused on impact investing.
