= Stephen DiRado =

American photographer (born 1957)

Stephen DiRado (born 1957) is an American photographer. His work is mostly black-and-white, and he makes frequent use of large-format cameras. He is most noted for his portraiture, night-astronomical photography, and semi-composed group photography, and for the extensive length of his projects.

He has been the recipient of fellowships from the John Simon Guggenheim Memorial Foundation, the Massachusetts Cultural Council, National Endowment for the Arts and the Massachusetts Artist Foundation. He has taken part in solo and group exhibitions at venues including the DeCordova and at the Museum of Fine Arts in Boston. His work is held in both public and private collections and has appeared in print in The New York Times Magazine.

DiRado's long term project, With Dad, was awarded the 2018 Bob and Diane Fund. The book, With Dad, is a photographic journal that vividly articulates a son’s connections, captured through his camera, as his father succumbs to Alzheimer’s. Experience the love, dignity and profound intimacy shared between Stephen DiRado and his family over a chronological span of twenty years. Published by Davis Art in 2019.

He is currently a Professor of Practice in photography within the Visual and Performing Arts Department at Clark University.

== Selected exhibitions ==
- Great River Arts, Bellows Falls, VT, "H2O, Film on Water" 2009
- Fitchburg Art Museum, Fitchburg, MA "Stephen DiRado's Dinner Series: How We Lived" 2008
- DeCordova Museum and Sculpture Park, Lincoln, MA, "JUMP" 2007
- Currier Museum of Art, Manchester, NH, New Acquisitions Show 2004
- Denis Bibro Fine Arts, New York, NY, "About Face" 2004
- Yossi Milo Gallery, New York, NY. "By The Sea"
- DeCordova Museum and Sculpture Park, Lincoln, MA. "Landscapes Seen and Imagined: Part II" 2003
- Tom Blau Gallery, London, UK, Celestial Series 2002
- Houston Center for Photography, Houston, TX, "Stephen DiRado, Dinner Table Series" 2002
- Museum of Fine Arts, Boston, MA "Lens Landscape" 2002
- The Photography Armory Show, New York, NY, Celestial Series 2002
- DeCordova Museum and Sculpture Park, Lincoln, MA. " Alone" 2002
- DeCordova Museum and Sculpture Park, Lincoln, MA. " Landscapes Seen and Imagined: Sense of Place" 2001
- Dorsky Gallery, (SOHO) New York City, NY, "At the Edge" 2001
- Robert Klein Gallery, Boston, MA, " Night Light" 2001
- The Afterimage Photograph Gallery, Dallas, TX, "Still Lifes" 2000
- MTA, Transit for Arts, Penn Station, New York City, NY, "Celestial Photographs" 2000
- Museum of Fine Arts, Houston, TX, "MFA, Houston: Recent Acquisitions" 1997
- Afterimage Photograph Gallery, Dallas, TX, "Nighttime" 1997
- Toledo Museum of Art, Center for the Visual Arts, Toledo, OH," Beach People" 1995
- The Vineyard Museum, Edgartown, MA, "Beach People" 1994
- Photographic Resource Center, Boston, MA, The New England Biennial 1993
- University Art Gallery, University of Massachusetts Dartmouth, North Dartmouth, MA, Jacob's House 1993
- DeCordova Museum and Sculpture Park, Lincoln, MA," Beach People" 1992
- Akin Gallery, Boston, MA, "Photo Constructions" 1991
- Worcester Art Museum, Worcester, MA, "Galleria Series" 1986
- Philadelphia Art Alliance, Philadelphia, PA, "Galleria Series" 1986
- Grove Street Gallery, Worcester, MA, "Bell Pond, Portrait of A Community" 1984

== Selected collections ==
- Natural History Museum, Berlin, Germany
- Currier Museum of Art, Manchester, NH
- Danforth Museum, Framingham, MA
- DeCordova Museum and Sculpture Park, Lincoln, MA
- Fitchburg Art Museum, Fitchburg, MA
- Lamar Dodd Art Center, LaGrange, GA
- Museum of Fine Arts, Boston, MA
- Museum of Fine Arts, Houston, TX
- New Britain Museum of Art, New Britain, CT
- New Hampshire Institute of Art, Teti Collection, Manchester, NH
- Polaroid Corporation, Dallas, TX
- Vineyard Museum, Edgartown, MA
- Worcester Art Museum, Worcester, MA
- Worcester Historical Museum, Worcester, MA

== Selected publications ==
- Esopus, Fall 2009, Issue 13, Artist's Project: Oliver Herring and Peter Krashes. Photograph Portraits of Herring and Krashes.
- New York Times Magazine, September 6, 2009, The Way We Live Now, article by Walter Kirn: A Pharmacological Education
- Boston Globe Arts Magazine, September 11, 2009, Shimmering Downriver, Cate McQuad. Review of exhibition.
