= Aaron Rosanoff =

American psychiatrist (1878–1943)

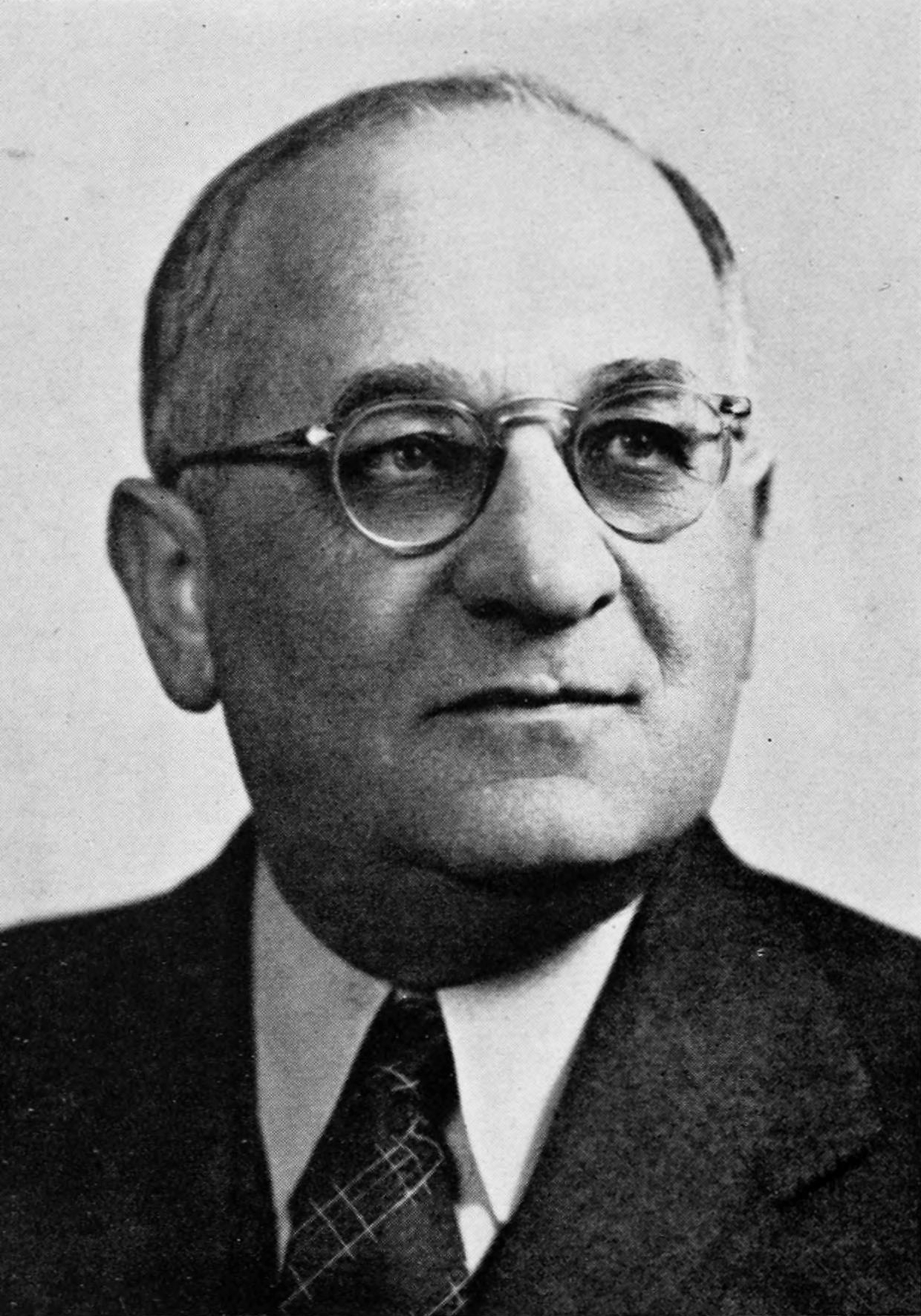
- Rosanoff c. 1940

Director of the California Department of Institutions
- In office January 2, 1939 – July 31, 1942
- Appointed by: Culbert Olson
- Preceded by: Harry Lutgens
- Succeeded by: Fred Otis Butler

Personal details
- Born: June 26, 1878 Pinsk, Minsk Governorate, Russian Empire
- Died: January 7, 1943 (aged 64) Los Angeles, California, U.S.
- Spouse: Isabel Jean Ross (m. 1911)
- Children: 4
- Education: Cornell University

Aaron Joshua Rosanoff (26 June 1878 – 7 January 1943) was an American psychiatrist who studied psychosis and was closely associated with the Eugenics Record Office and a member of the Eugenics Research Association.

== Life and career ==
Born in Belarus, Rosanoff emigrated to the United States in 1891 and received an M.D. from Cornell in 1900. He worked as a physician at Kings Park Hospital from 1901 to 1922, and as a psychiatrist for the L.A. Diagnostic Clinic from 1922 until his death. He was also California's State Director of Institutions and State Commissioner of Lunacy from 1939 until his resignation in 1942.

Closely associated with the Eugenics Record Office and a member of the Eugenics Research Association, Rosanoff was a member of the American Eugenics Society Advisory council from 1923 to 1935. He was also a member of the editorial Board of the American Journal of Psychiatry. In 1905 he translated Manual of Psychiatry by Joseph Rogues de Fursac, a medical school textbook which went through several editions and from 1927 appeared only under Rosanoff's name.

== Work ==
Rosanoff studied both the physiological and genetic factors that lead to various psychoses, and is best known for his Theory of Personality, which broke down the human personality into seven scales: Normal, Hysteroid, Manic, Depressive, Autistic, Paranoid, and Epileptoid. These scales first modelled in the Humm-Wadsworth Temperament Scale personality test in 1935. These scales were used into the 1970s, notably by Chandler McLeod, who use a modified Humm system.

== Sources ==
- Barry Mehler, A History of the American Eugenics Society, Ph.D. dissertation, 1988, University of Illinois.
