= Louis M. Aucoin =

United Nations Secretary-General Deputy Special Representative for Liberia

- Born: January 26, 1950 (age 76)
- Education: College of the Holy Cross (BA); Boston College (JD)
- Known for: United Nations Secretary-General Deputy Special Representative for Liberia

Louis M. Aucoin is the United Nations Secretary-General Deputy Special Representative (Rule of Law) for Liberia.

== Biography ==
In 1971, he graduated from the College of the Holy Cross with a BA in modern languages. He earned a JD in 1975 from the Boston College Law School.

== Career ==
At the time of his UN appointment, Aucoin worked as the academic director of the Master of Laws program in international law at The Fletcher School at Tufts University. He also taught law at the Sorbonne as a Fulbright lecturer and for fifteen years as a professor at the Boston University School of Law.
