= Martin André Rosanoff =

Russian-American chemist

Martin André Rosanoff, Sc.D. (December 28, 1874 – July 30, 1951) was a Russian-American chemist. Born at Nikolaev, Russia, he was educated at Nikolaev in the classical Gymnasium of that city, in Berlin, and in Paris. Later, he studied at New York University in the United States. He was occupied in various positions at New York City and in Pittsburgh, Pennsylvania at Mellon Institute where he was elected the first life incumbent of the newly endowed Willard Gibbs chair of research in pure chemistry.

He developed along with Fischer what is called the Fischer–Rosanoff convention, or just Rosanoff convention, that determined which enantiomer of glyceraldehyde is the D-form.
