= Chief economist =

Executive role

A chief economist is a single-position job class having primary responsibility for the development, coordination, and production of economic and financial analysis. It is distinguished from the other economist positions by the broader scope of responsibility encompassing the planning, supervision, and coordination of the economic research.

== Synopsis ==
Chief economists work primarily in banks and government institutions. By the 2010s, the chief economist position was established at large internet companies such as Google and Microsoft. Further, a trend began in data and financial services companies to utilize chief economists in customer- and media-facing roles to help in placing data in a larger economic context.

== Government positions ==
In the European Union (EU), the post of Chief Economist (aka Chief Competition Economist) was created in 2003 as part of the European Commission, reporting to the Director General for Competition. This role is primarily focused on advising around the application of EU competition rules and providing input to legal cases before the European Courts.

In Kenya, as of 1998, (Note: A new Kenyan Constitution was ratified in 2010, likely significantly revising the roles and organization of the government.) the role of chief economist was expressed as "Chief Economist/Statistician" and resided in the Ministry of Planning and National Development, one responsibility of which was to lead "a planning department or the Central Bureau of Statistics".

In the United States government, there are several Offices of the Chief Economist for different departments. For instance, the Office of the Chief Economist within the United States Department of State was first staffed in March 2012 by Heidi Crebo-Rediker, and the Office of the Chief Economist within the United States Department of Agriculture is led, as of 2014, by Joseph W. Glauber. From 2014-2016, the Chief Economist for the U.S. State Department was Rodney D. Ludema. The Chief Economist as of January 20, 2019 to present is Dr. Sharon Brown-Hruska.

In Canada, the Office of the Chief Economist reports and advises on international trade and economic issues, including global, regional and sectoral trends and developments; and undertakes trade and economic research and analysis in support of Foreign Affairs, Trade and Development Canada's various functions: trade and investment policy, including negotiation of international agreements; international business development; and trade litigation. The post-holders are civil servants responsible to the Minister of International Trade. Export Development Canada and Business Development Canada both have Chief Economists too.

== See also ==
- World Bank Chief Economist
- Economist § Professions
