= List of cooking vessels =

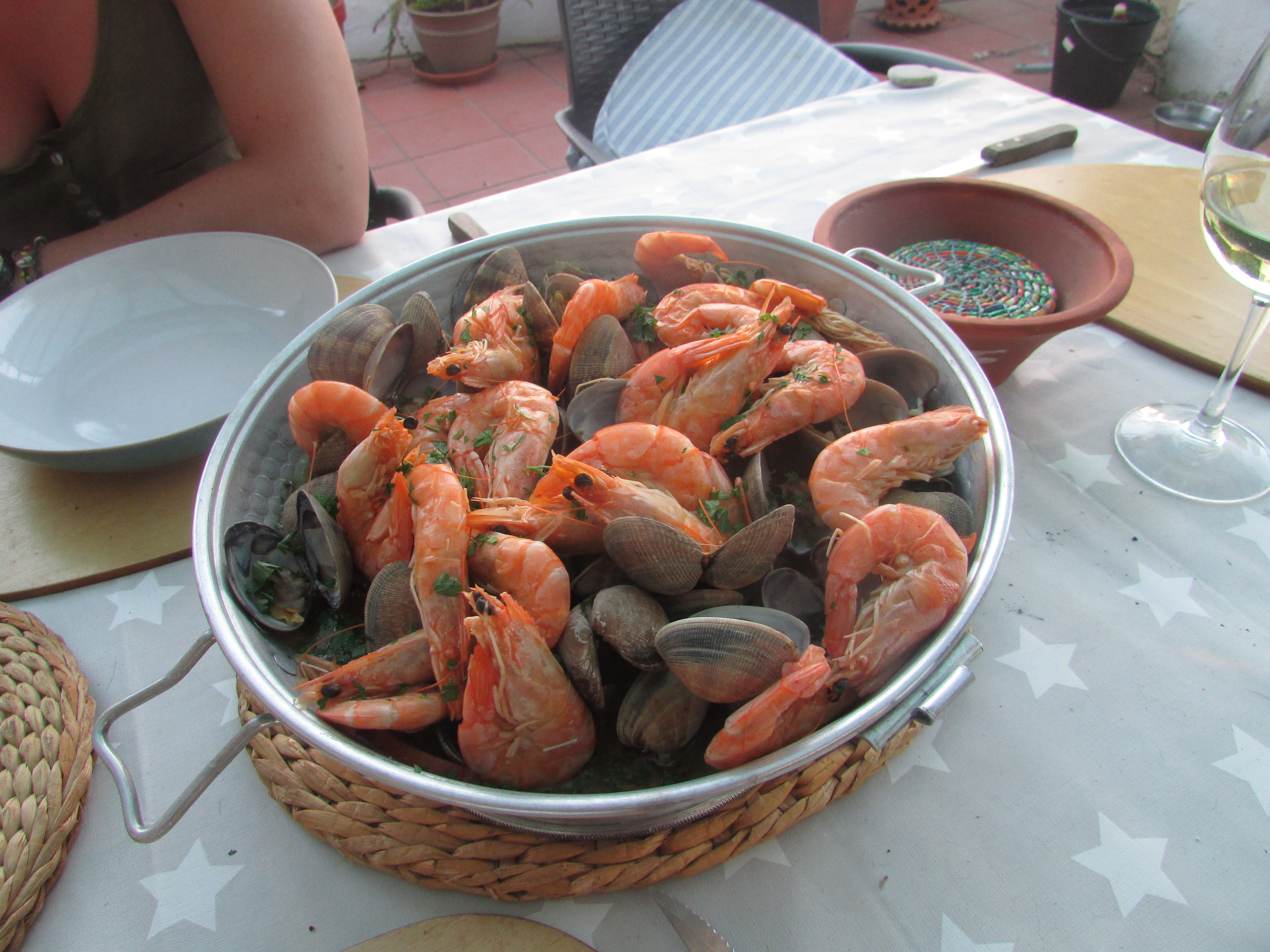
Clams and shrimp in a cataplana

This is a list of cooking vessels. A cooking vessel is a type of cookware or bakeware designed for cooking, baking, roasting, boiling or steaming. Cooking vessels are manufactured using materials such as steel, cast iron, aluminum, clay and various other ceramics. All cooking vessels, including ceramic ones, absorb and retain heat after cooking has finished.

== Cooking vessels ==
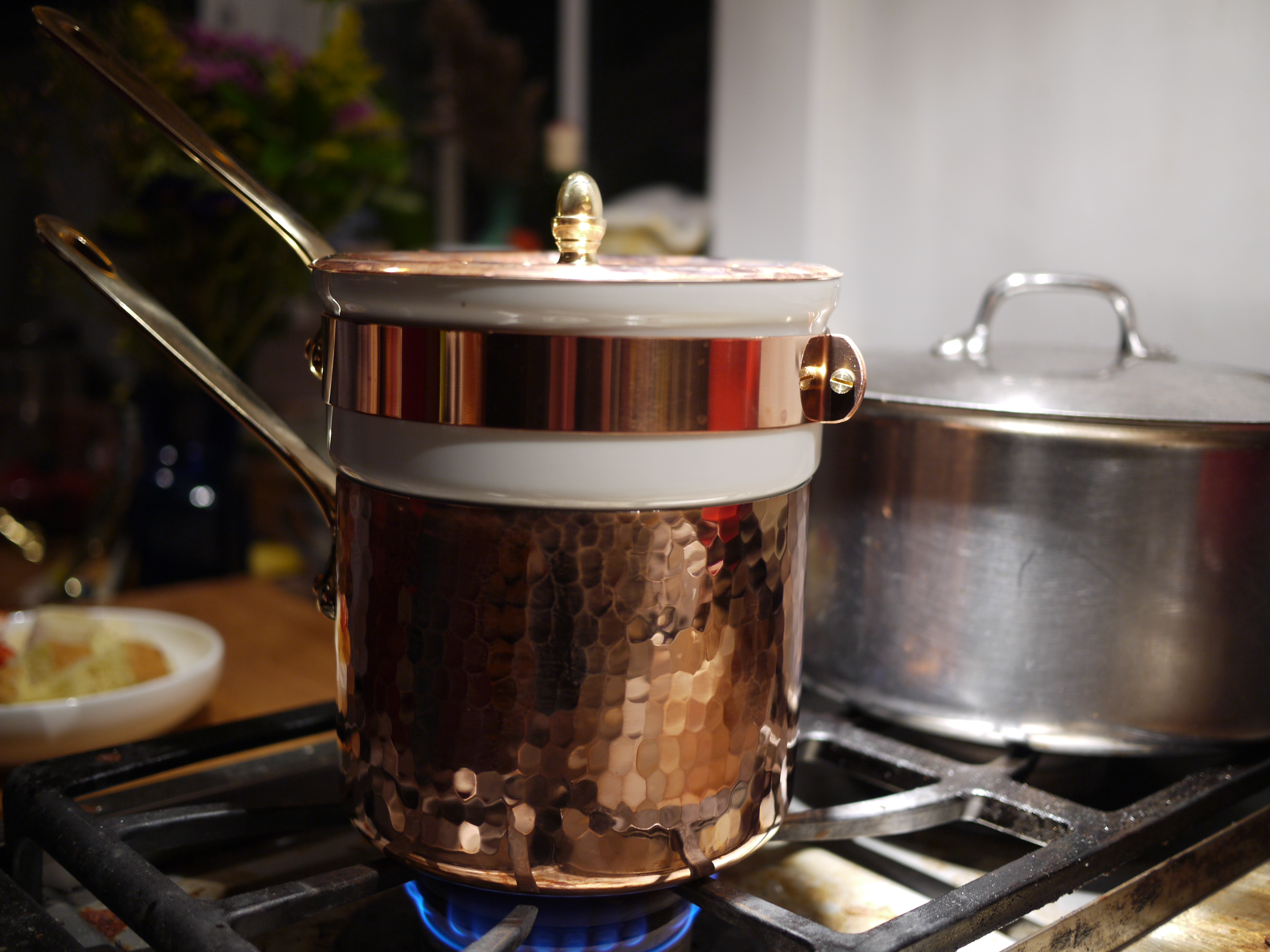
A bain-marie on a stovetop

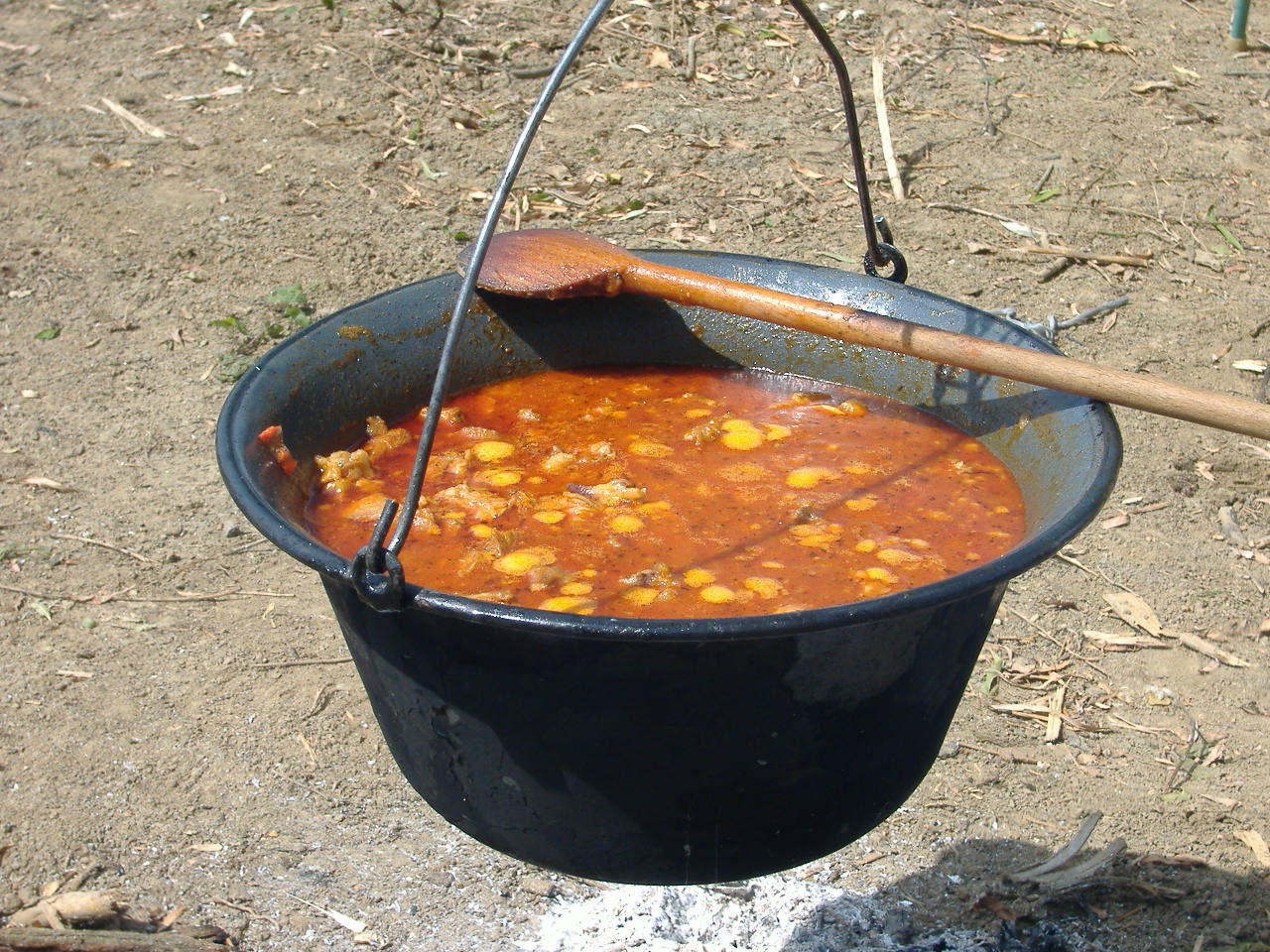
Hungarian goulash in a traditional bogrács cauldron

- Bain-marie or double boiler – in cooking applications, usually consists of a pan of water in which another container or containers of food to be cooked is placed within the pan of water.
- Beanpot – a deep, wide-bellied, short-necked vessel used to cook bean-based dishes. Beanpots are typically made of ceramic, though pots made of other materials, like cast iron, can also be found.
- Billycan – a lightweight cooking pot in the form of a metal bucket commonly used for boiling water, making tea or cooking over a campfire or to carry water.
- Bratt pan – large cooking receptacles designed for producing large-scale meals. They are typically used for braising, searing, shallow frying and general cooking.
- Bread pan – also called a loaf pan; a pan specifically designed for baking bread.
- Caquelon – a cooking vessel of stoneware, ceramic, enamelled cast iron, or porcelain for the preparation of fondue; also called a fondue pot.
- Casserole – a large, deep dish used both in the oven and as a serving vessel. The word is also used for the food cooked and served in such a vessel, with the cookware itself called a casserole dish or casserole pan.
- Cassole
- Cassolette – small porcelain, glass, or metal container used for the cooking and serving of individual dishes. It can also refer to the ingredients and recipe itself.
- Cast-iron cookware – typically seasoned before use
- Cataplana – used to prepare Portuguese seafood dishes, popular on the country's Algarve region.
- Cauldron – a large metal pot for cooking or boiling over an open fire, with a large mouth and frequently with an arc-shaped hanger.

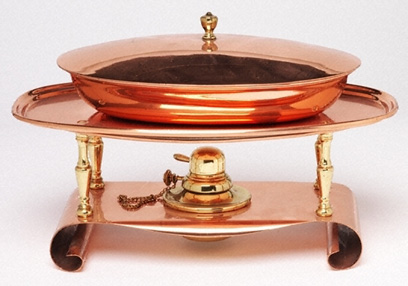
Chafing dish and stand, c. 1895, Victoria and Albert Museum, London

- Chafing dish – a cooking pan heated by an alcohol burner for cooking at table. In catering, the burner heats a water reservoir, making it a sort of portable steam table. Historically, it was a kind of portable grate raised on a tripod heated with charcoal in a brazier. The chafing dish could be used at table or provided with a cover for keeping food warm on a buffet.
- Chip pan – a deep-sided cooking pan used for deep-frying
- Chugun, Russian cast-iron crock
- Crepulja – a shallow clay container with a little hole in the middle, it is put on fire until well heated, then lifted with a hook, and dough is put into it and covered with a sač. The sač is covered with ashes and live coals.
- Crock
- Ding – prehistoric and ancient Chinese cauldrons, standing upon legs with a lid and two facing handles. They are one of the most important shapes used in Chinese ritual bronzes.
- Dolsot – a small-sized cookware-cum-serveware made of agalmatolite, suitable for one to two servings of bap (cooked rice). In Korean cuisine, various hot rice dishes such as bibimbap or gulbap (oyster rice) as well as plain white rice can be prepared and served in dolsot. As a dolsot does not cool off as soon as removed from the stove, rice continues to cook and arrives at the table still sizzling.

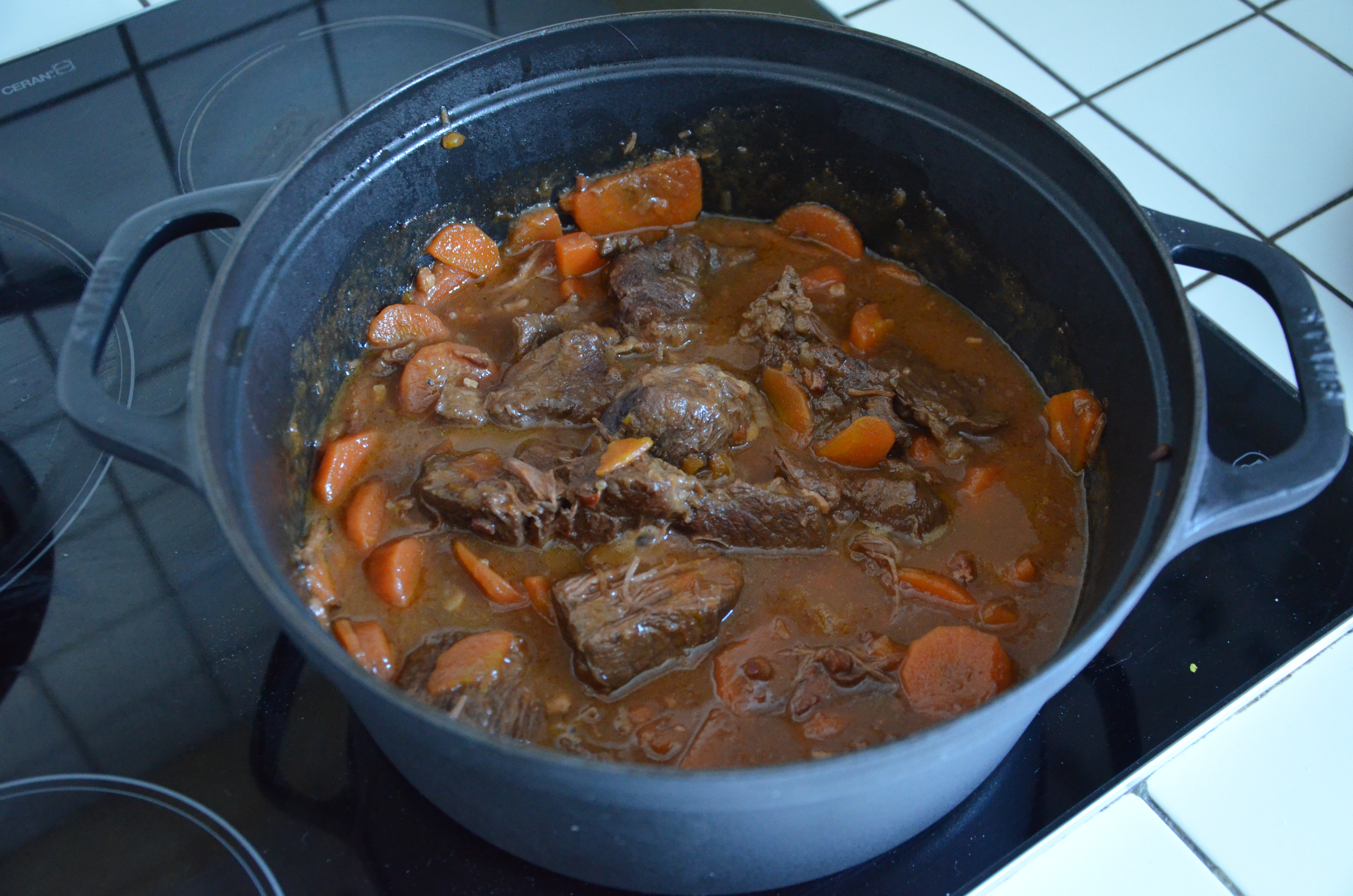
Beef stew in a Dutch oven

- Dutch oven – a cast iron shallow round pot with a tight-fitting lid with a raised rim around the top. The oven is placed over live coals and live coals placed in the lid as well. Used for baking, but also for cooking stews, etc. Modern versions for stewing on a stove top or in a conventional oven are thick-walled cooking pots with a tight-fitting lid with no raised rim, and sometimes made of cast aluminium or ceramic, rather than the traditional cast iron.
- Fish kettle – a large, oval-shaped kettle used for cooking whole fish. Owing to their necessarily unwieldy size, fish kettles usually have racks and handles, and notably tight-fitting lids
- Frying pan – a flat-bottomed pan used for frying, searing, and browning foods

- Tava – a large flat, concave or convex disc-shaped frying pan (dripping pan) made from metal, usually sheet iron, cast iron, sheet steel or aluminium. It is used in South, Central, and West Asia, as well as in Caucasus, for cooking a variety of flatbreads and as a frying pan.

- Gamasot – a big, heavy pot or cauldron used for Korean cooking
- Gastronorm - standardised nesting trays, typically of stainless steel but also available in plastic and occasionally ceramic, used in commercial catering for a wide range of uses. This can include food prep, boiling, baking, steaming, draining and straining, storing, and serving. They are often paired with a bain-marie for heating and warming, or a Chafing dish for serving. The standard fractional sizing allows a fixed size holder to be subdivided into multiple sized containers without wasted space as would occur with round containers.
- Handi – a deep, wide-mouthed cooking vessel used in north Indian, Pakistani and Bengali cooking. Because there are many specific Indian and Pakistani dishes cooked in this vessel, their names reflect its use, such as handi biryani.
- Karahi – a type of thick, circular, and deep cooking-pot similar in shape to a wok that originated in the Indian subcontinent
- Kazan – a type of large cooking pot used throughout Central Asia, Russia, and the Balkan Peninsula
- Marmite – a traditional crockery casserole vessel found in France, it is known for its "pot-belly" shape.
- Microwave - a type of oven that uses microwaves (wavelength) to vibrate water molecules to heat food up from the inside out.
- Mold
- Muffin tin
- Olla – a ceramic jar, often unglazed, used for cooking stews or soups, for the storage of water or dry foods, or for other purposes.
- Pipkin – an earthenware cooking pot used for cooking over direct heat from coals or a wood fire.
- Palayok – a clay pot used as the traditional food preparation container in the Philippines used for cooking.

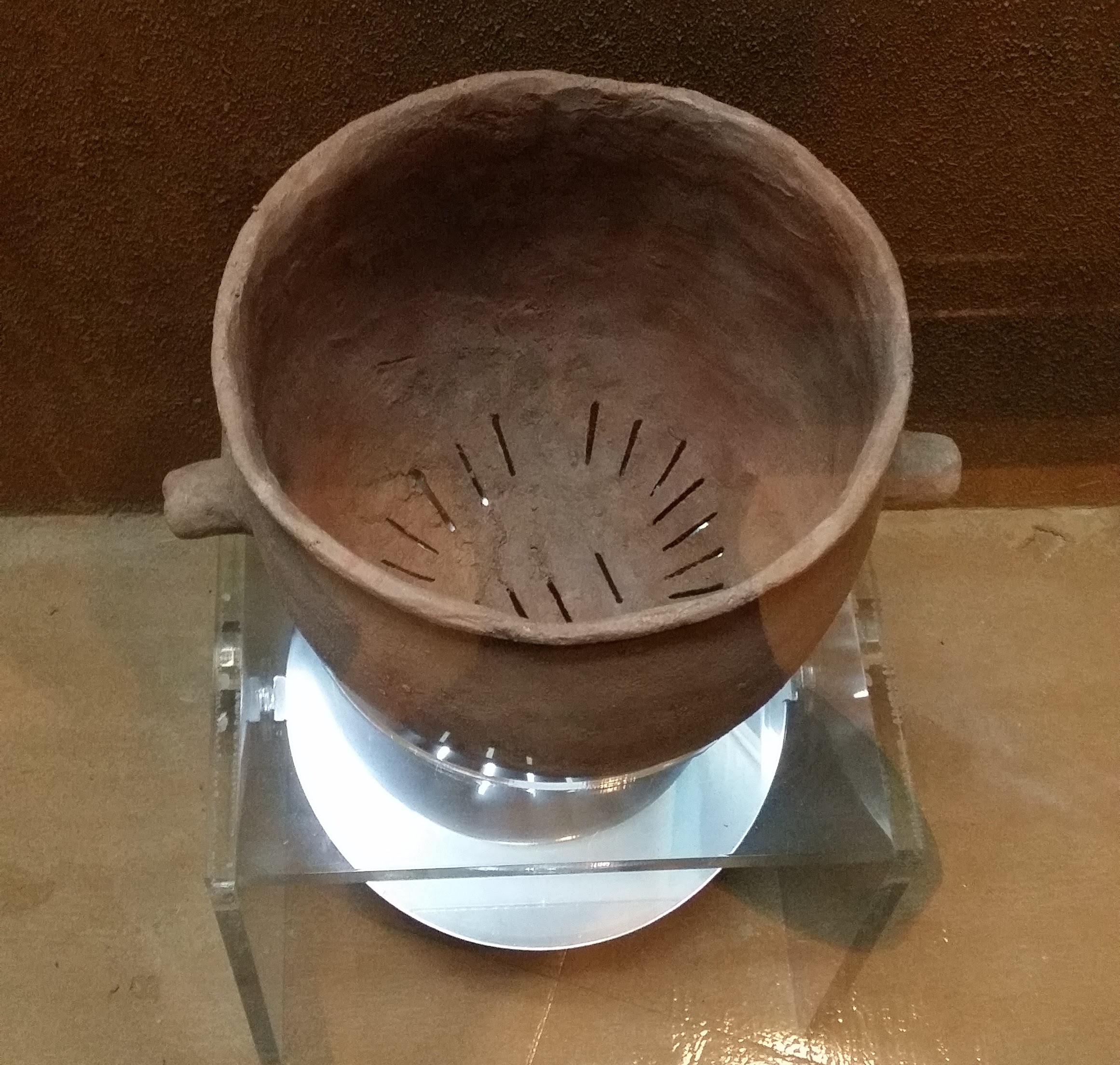
A Bronze Age siru food steamer

- Porringer – a shallow bowl, 4–6 inches (10–15 cm) in diameter, and 1.5–3 inches (3.8–7.6 cm) deep; the form originates in the medieval period in Europe and they were made in wood, ceramic, pewter and silver. A second, modern usage, for the term porringer is a double saucepan similar to a bain-marie used for cooking porridge. The porridge is cooked gently in the inner saucepan, heated by steam from boiling water in the outer saucepan.
- Potjie – a small pot used for cooking portions of stew
- Pressure cooker
- Ramekin – a small glazed ceramic or glass bowl used for cooking and serving various dishes
- Rice cooker
- Roasting pan
- Sinseollo – A Korean dish that shares the proper name for the cooking vessel in which this dish is served
- Siru – an earthenware steamer used to steam grain or grain flour dishes such as rice cakes.
- Slow cooker
- Springform pan – a type of bakeware that features sides that can be removed from the base
- Stock pot – a generic name for one of the most common types of cooking pot used worldwide

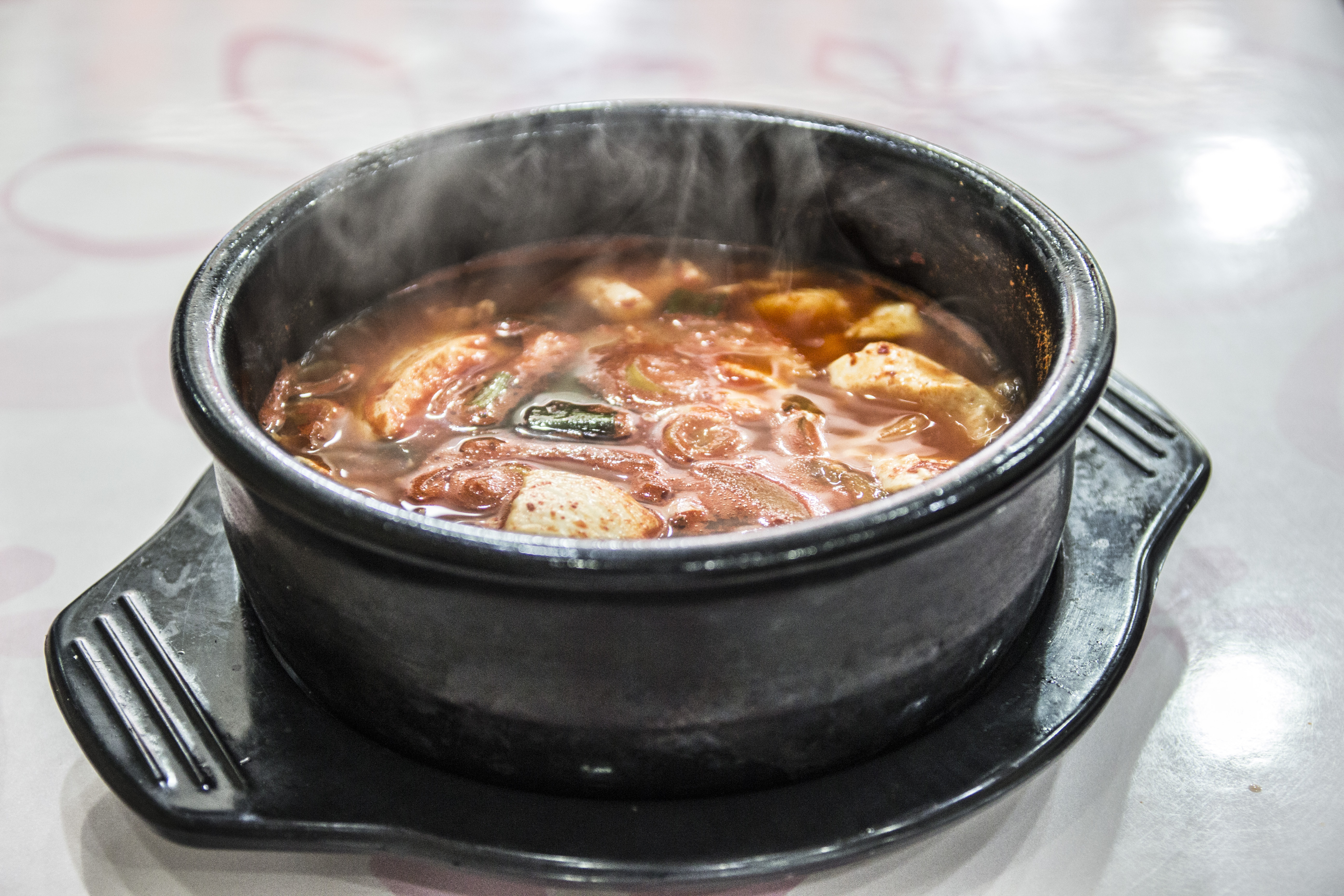
A ttukbaegi filled with sundubu-jjigae

- Sufuria – a flat based, deep sided, lipped and handleless cooking pot or container. It is ubiquitous in Kenya, Tanzania and other Great Lakes nations.
- Tajine – a North African Berber dish which is named after the earthenware pot in which it is cooked.
- Tangia – an urn-shaped terra cotta cooking vessel
- Tapayan (or tempayan) – a large earthen jar in island Southeast Asia used for cooking, fermentation, and storing water.
- Terrine – glazed earthenware (terracotta) cooking dish with vertical sides and a tightly fitting lid, generally rectangular or oval. Modern versions are also made of enameled cast iron.
- Tian – an earthenware vessel of Provence, France, used both for cooking and serving
- Ttukbaegi – a type of oji-gureut, which is an onggi coated with brown-tone ash glaze. The small, black to brown earthenware vessel is a cookware-cum-serveware used for various jjigae (stew), gukbap (soup with rice), or other boiled dishes in Korean cuisine. As a ttukbaegi retains heat and does not cool off as soon as removed from the stove, stews and soups in ttukbaegi usually arrive at the table at a bubbling boil.
- Uruli
- Wok – a versatile round-bottomed cooking vessel, originating from China, it is used in a range of different Chinese cooking techniques

=== Coffee cooking vessels ===
- Cezve – a pot designed specifically to make Turkish coffee
- Dallah – a traditional Arabic coffee pot used for centuries to brew and serve Qahwa (gahwa), an Arabic coffee or Gulf coffee made through a multi-step ritual, and Khaleeji, a spicy, bitter coffee traditionally served during feasts like Eid al-Fitr.
- Jebena – a container used to brew coffee in the Ethiopian and Eritrean traditional coffee ceremony
- Moka pot – a stove top coffee maker that functions by passing hot water driven by vapor pressure and heat-driven gas expansion through ground coffee
- Coffee percolator – a type of pot used for the brewing of coffee by continually cycling the boiling or nearly boiling brew through the grounds using gravity
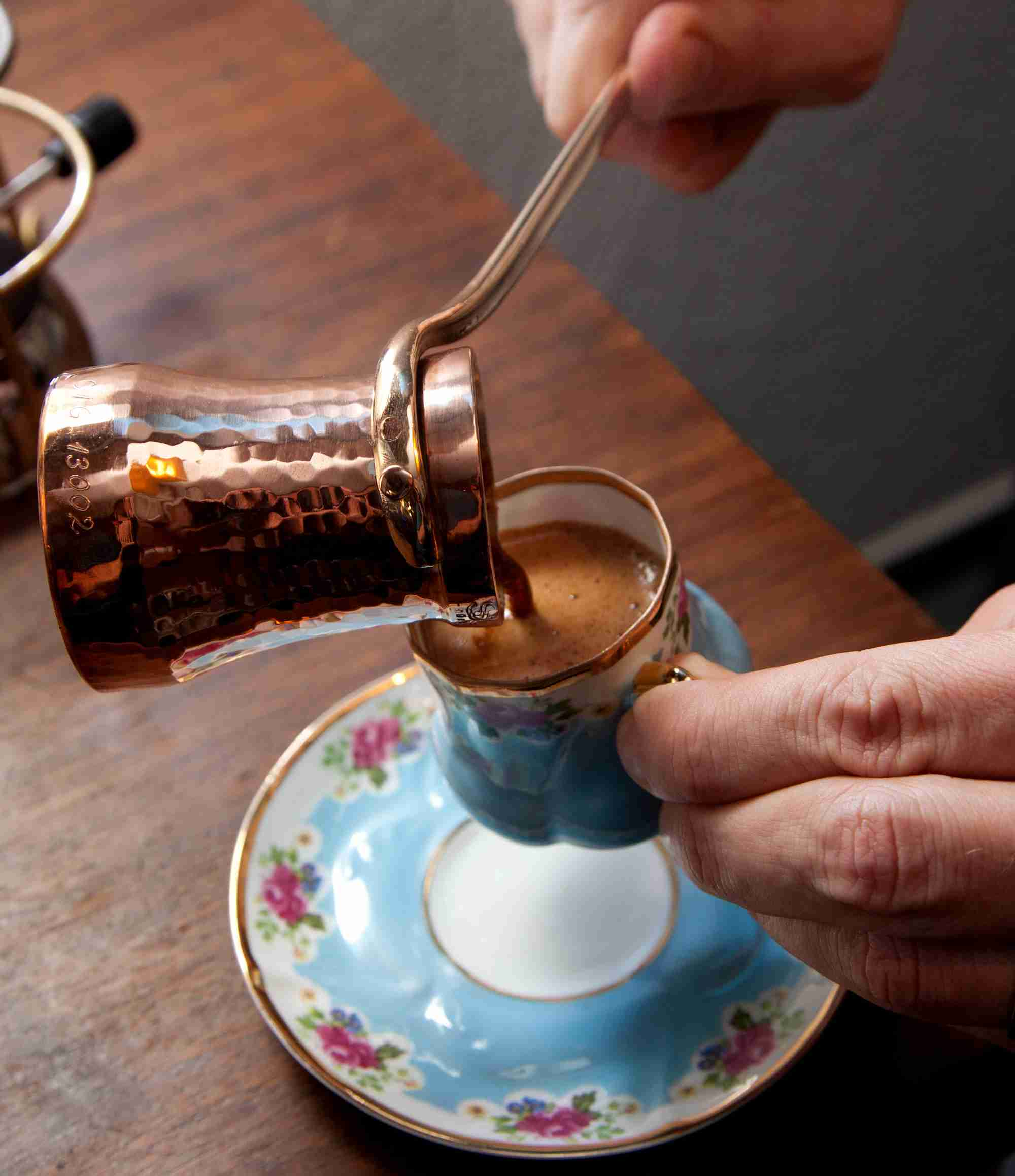
A cup of Turkish coffee, served from a copper cezve, in Turkey

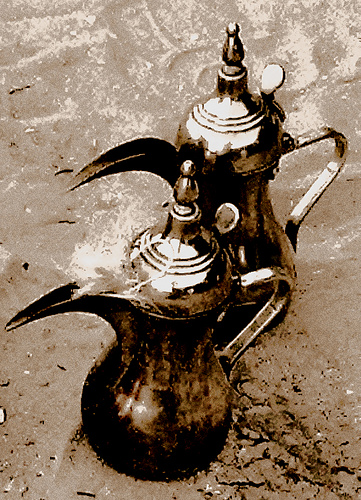
Dallahs

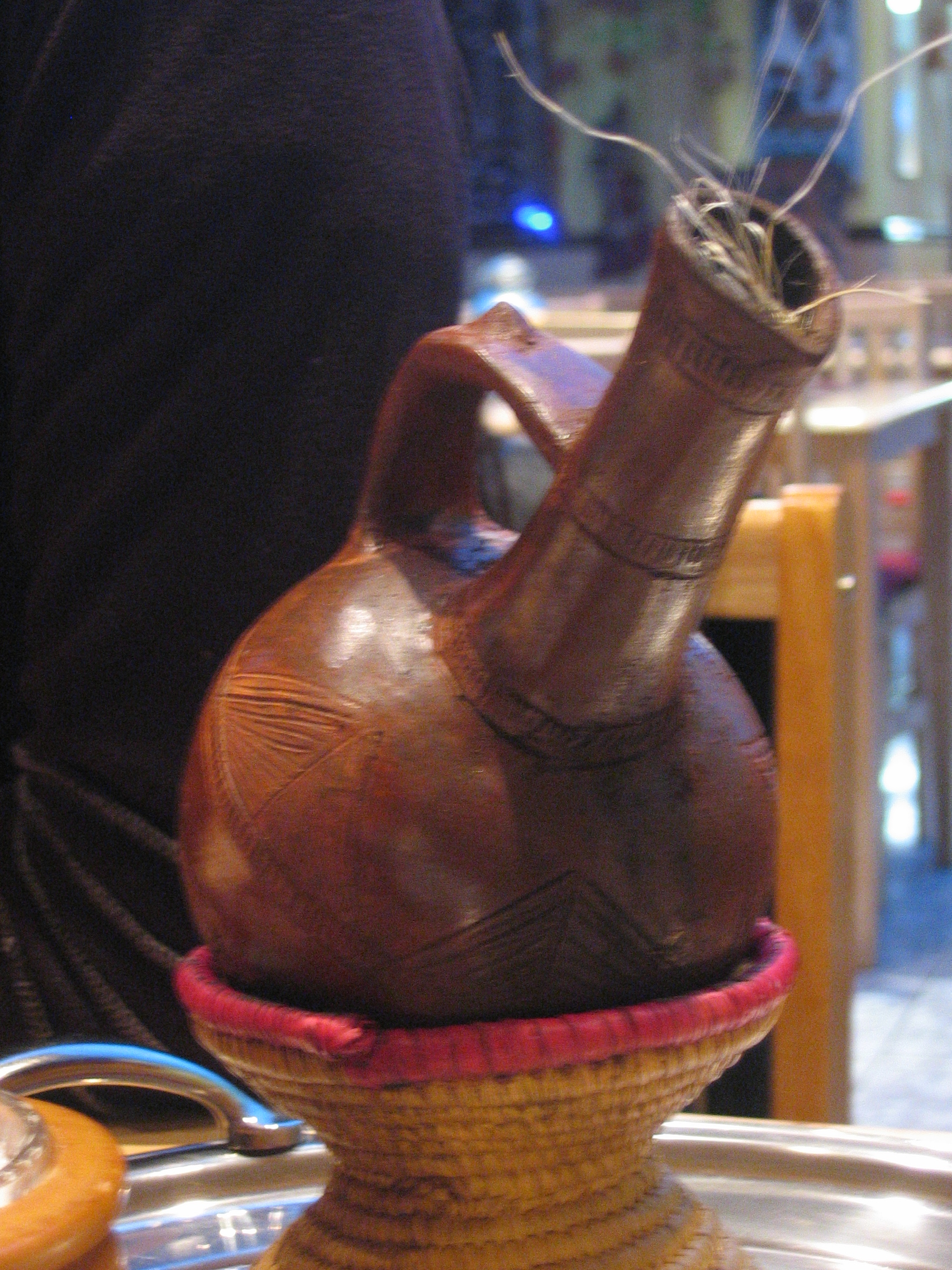
An Eritrean jebena

=== Steamers ===
- Food steamers are used to cook or prepare various foods with steam heat by means of holding the food in a closed vessel reducing steam escape. This manner of cooking is called steaming.

- Couscoussier – a traditional double-chambered food steamer used in Berber and Arabic cuisines (particularly, the Libyan, the Tunisian, the Algerian and the Moroccan) to cook couscous.
- Bamboo steamer
- Puttu kutti – A hemispherical or cylindrical metallic vessel used in South India to make puttu or steamed rice cake.
- Siru – an earthenware steamer used to steam grain or grain flour dishes such as tteok (rice cakes).

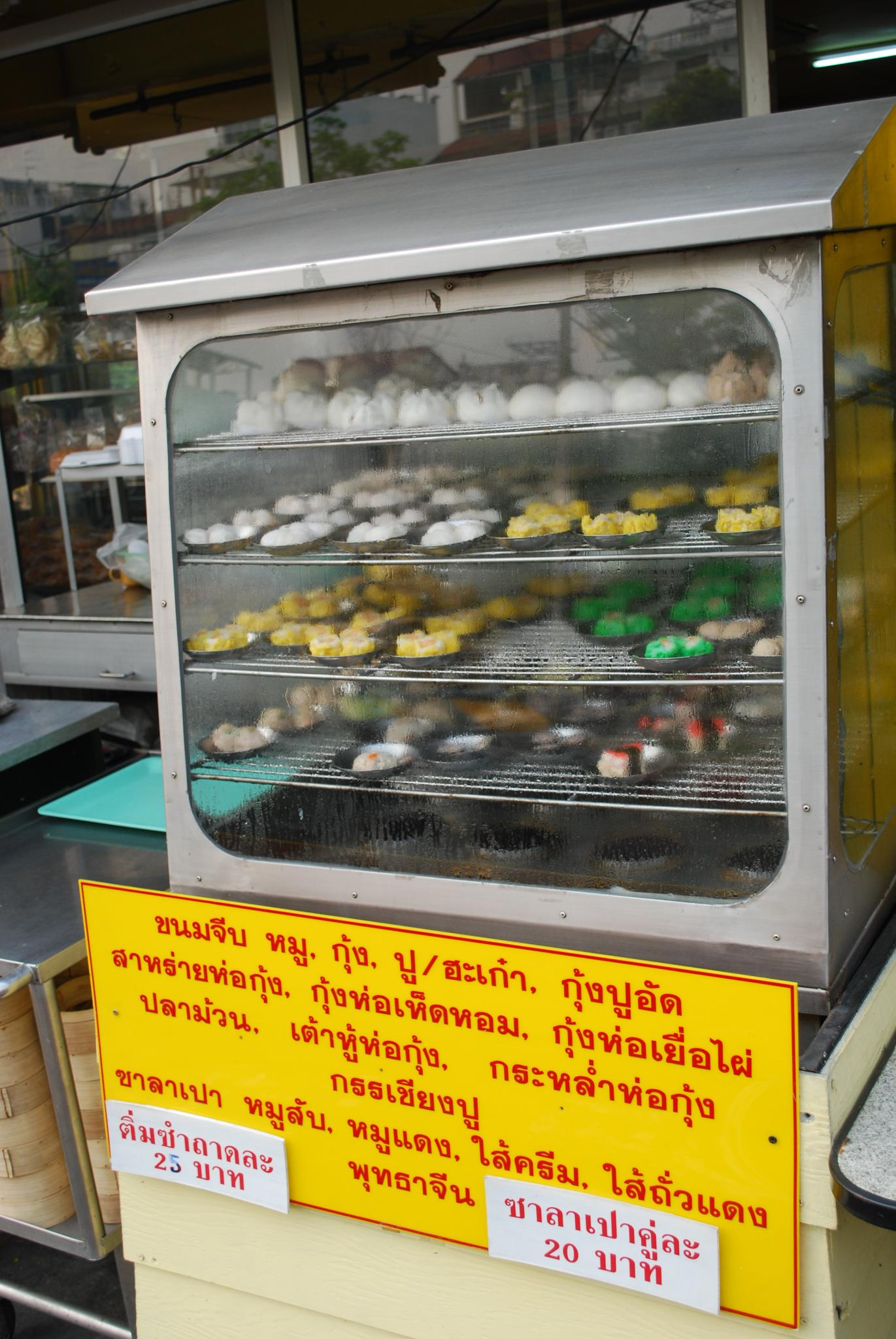
Dim sum in a food steamer

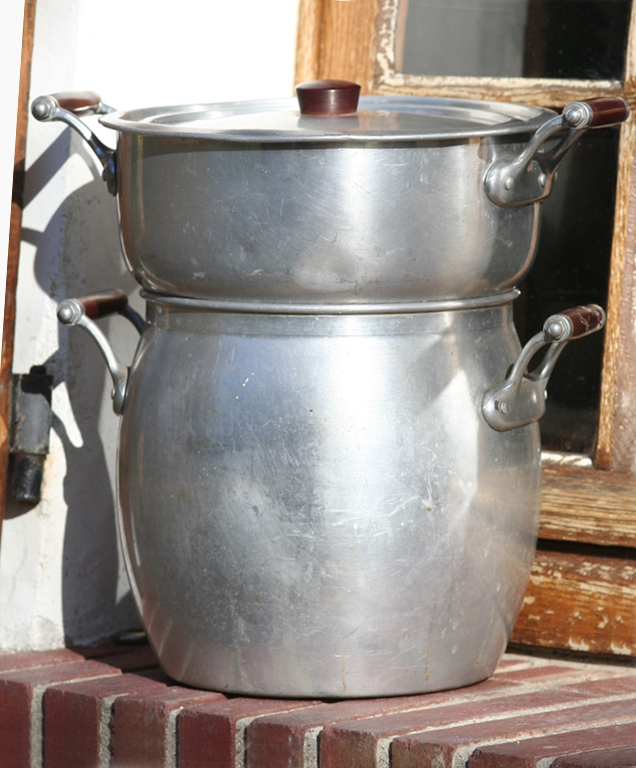
A couscoussier, a type of steamer used to cook couscous

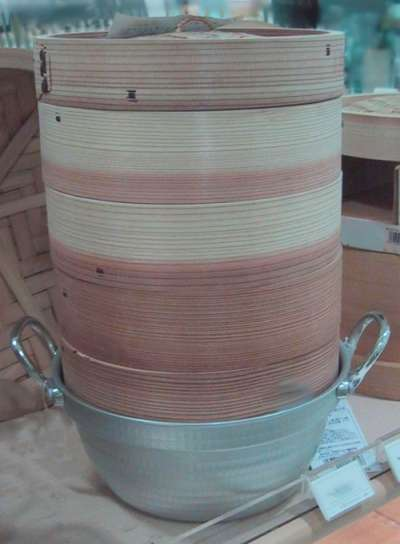
Stacked bamboo steamers on top of a pot

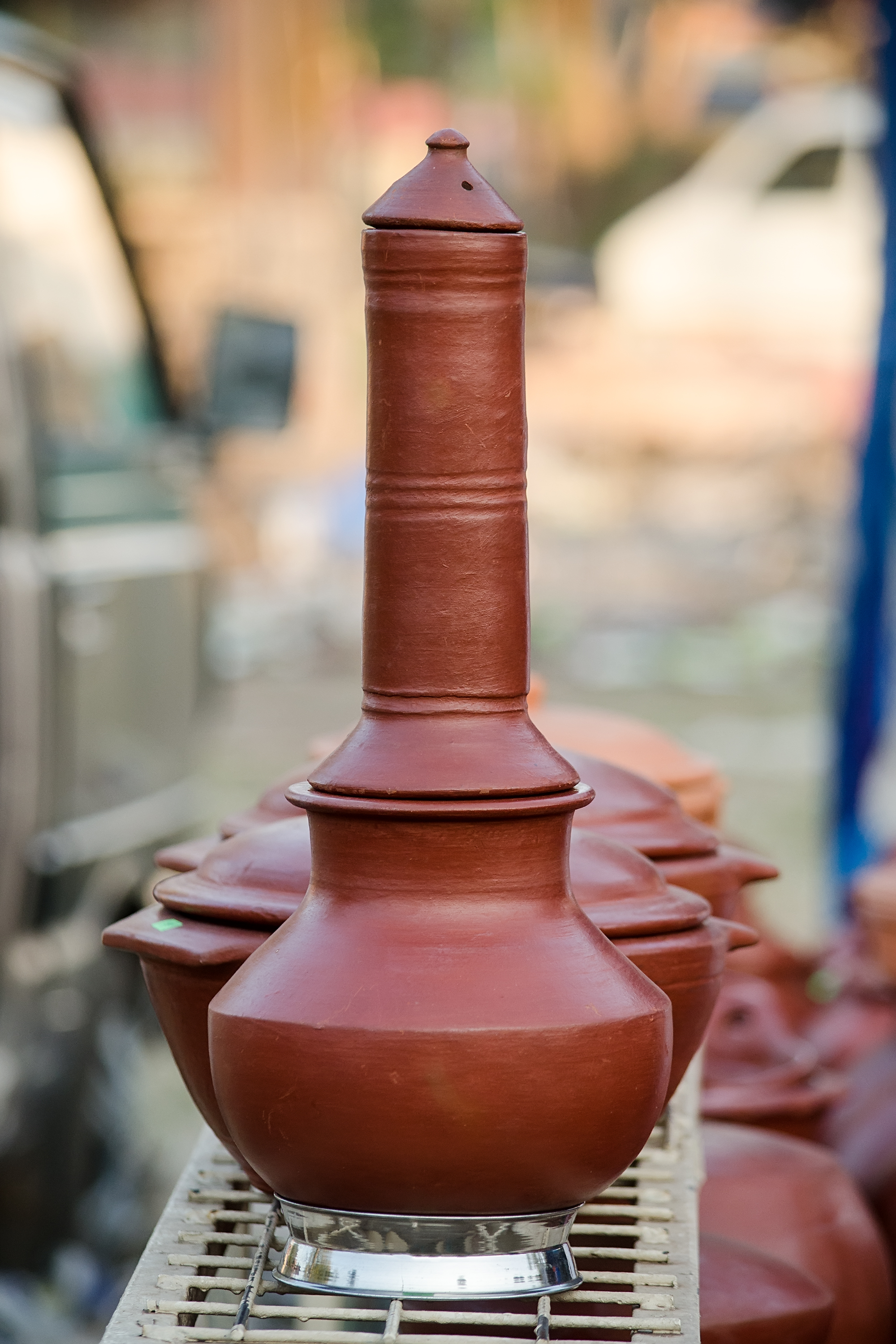
A Puttu kutti or puttu maker made of clay

== Brands and companies ==
- All-Clad – At the time of its founding, All-Clad used a patented "roll bonding" process in which metals are sandwiched together and then formed into a cooking vessel. The company derived its name from this cladding process, which is applied not only on the bottom but extends all the way up the sides of each cooking vessel. The company has been issued several patents by the United States Patent and Trademark Office (USPTO).
- Chue Chin Hua – an aluminium cookware and metal producing company in Thailand
- CorningWare – was originally a brand name for a unique glass-ceramic (Pyroceram) cookware resistant to thermal shock. It was first introduced in 1958 by Corning Glass Works in the United States.
- Cousances – French cookware manufacturer, known for enameled cast iron pans (cocotte in French). The company was formed in 1553 and was acquired by Le Creuset in 1957.
- Descoware – a brand of porcelain-coated cast iron cookware
- Emile Henry
- Fire-King
- Grab-it – microwave-safe cookware introduced by Corning Glass Works in 1977
- Le Chasseur
- Le Creuset – a French cookware manufacturer best known for its colorfully-enameled cast-iron cookware "French ovens", also known as "casseroles" or "Dutch ovens"
- Lodge
- Nordic Ware – a company based in Minnesota notable for introducing the Bundt cake pan in the early 1950s.
- Premiere Pan (USA Pan) – Manufacturers of commercial baking pans, based in suburban Pittsburgh.
- Prestige – Manufacturers of cooking utensils based in India.
- Pyrex – a brand introduced by Corning Inc. in 1908 for a line of clear, low-thermal-expansion borosilicate glass used for laboratory glassware and kitchenware.
- Revere Ware – a line of consumer and commercial kitchen wares introduced in 1939 by the Revere Brass & Copper Corp., focusing primarily on consumer cookware such as skillets, sauce pans, stock pots, and tea kettles.
- Staub – a brand of enameled cast iron cookware and bakeware that was originally headquartered in Turckheim, Alsace, France
- Swiss Diamond International – a company that produces nonstick cookware using diamond crystals
- Visions – a brand of transparent stove top cookware originally created by Corning France and released in Europe during the late 1970s and in other markets beginning a short time later.
- West Bend Company
- Wonder Pot – an Israeli invention for baking on top of a gas stove rather than in an oven. It consists of three parts: an aluminium pot shaped like a Bundt pan except smooth-sided rather than fluted, a hooded cover perforated with venting holes, and a thick, round, slightly domed metal disc with a center hole that is placed between the pot and the flame.
- World Kitchen
- Kitchenall – a New York-based distributor of commercial kitchen, cooking, refrigeration and restaurant equipment and supplies.

== Gallery ==
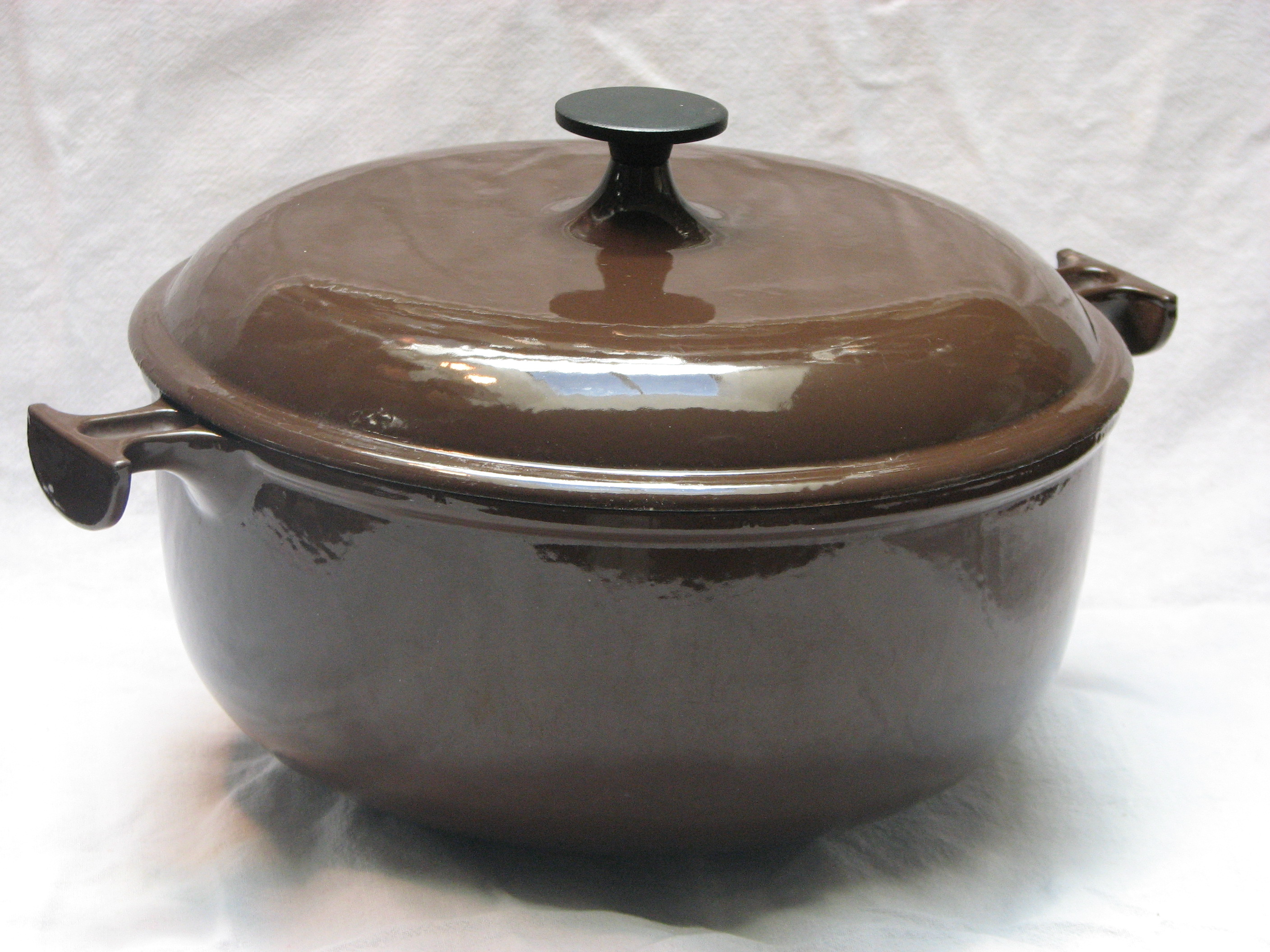
An enameled cast-iron pot

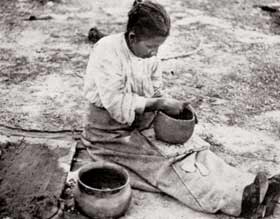
A Catawba potter making an olla, 1908

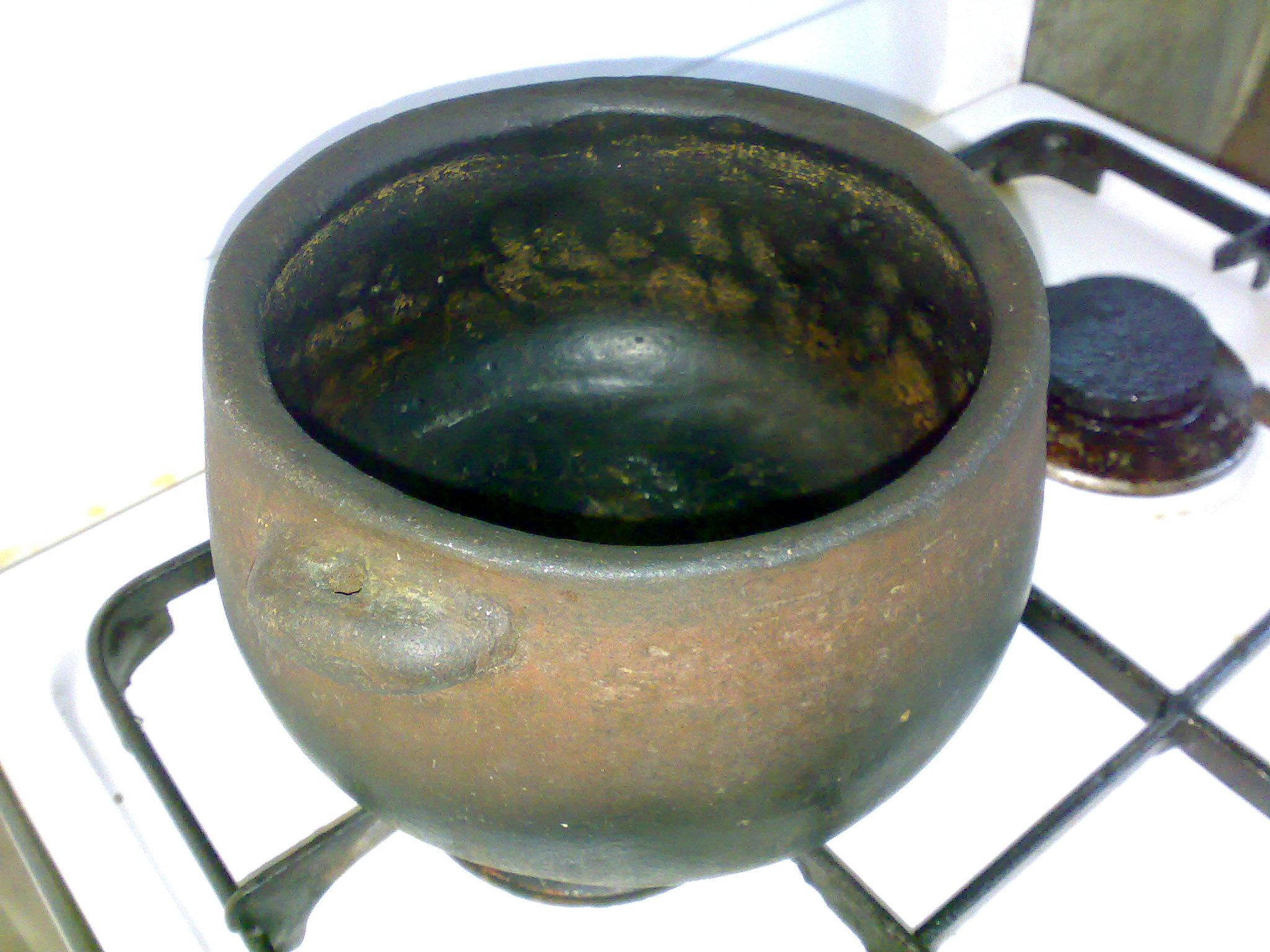
An anglit, a small palayok

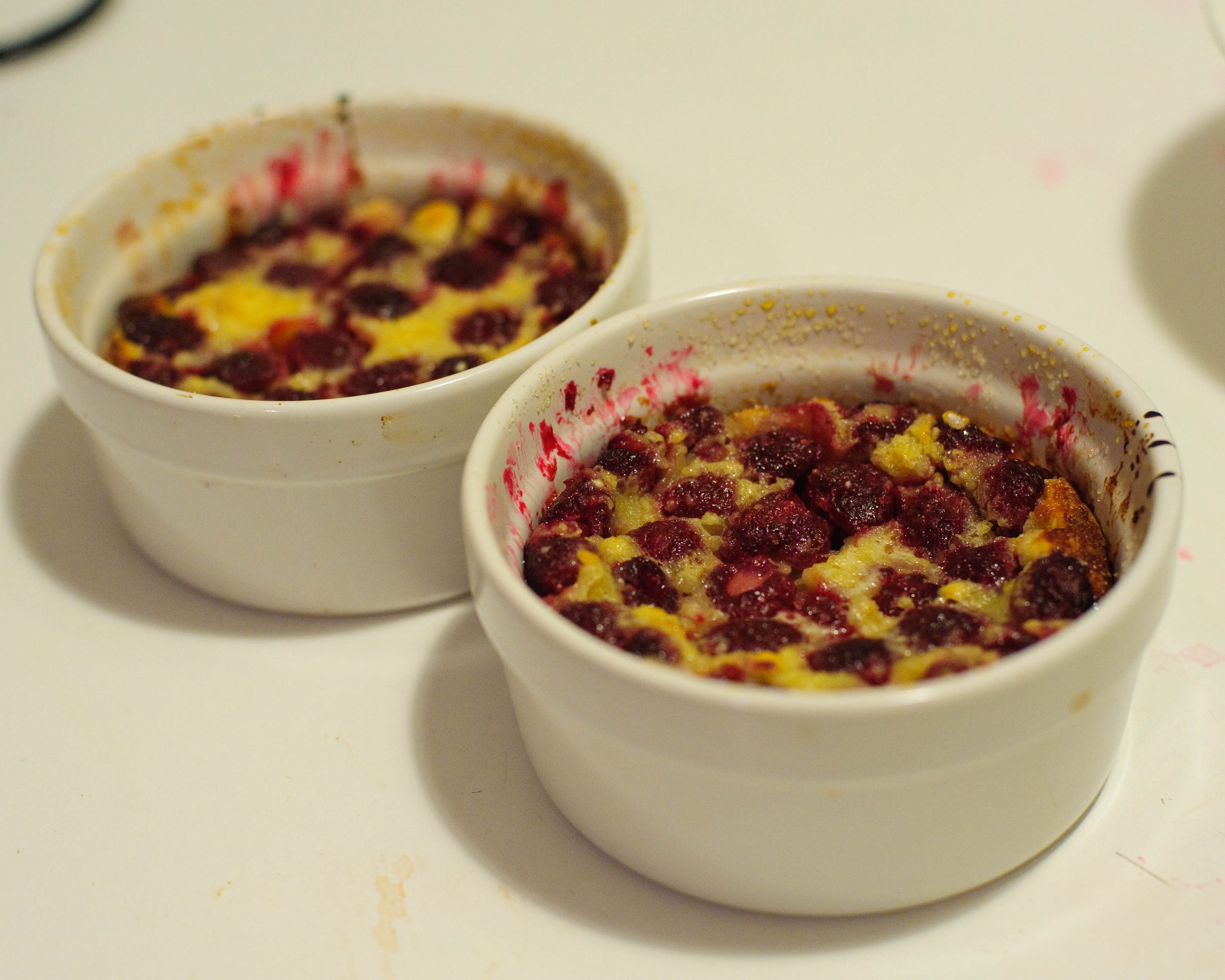
Clafoutis in ramekins

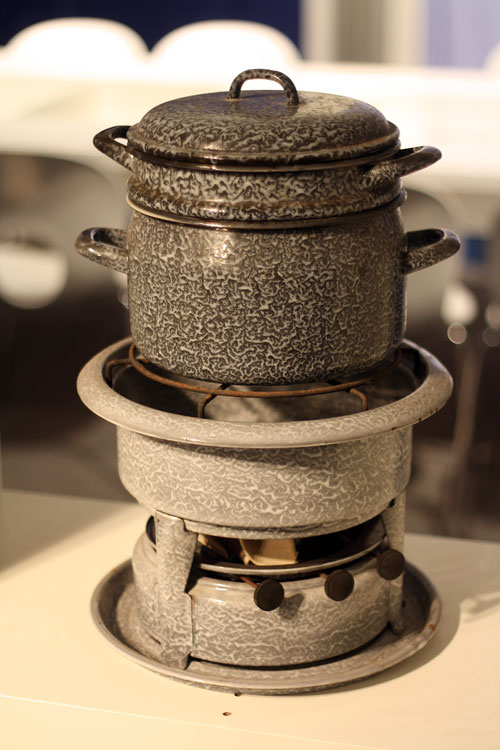
An old type of rice cooker commonly used in the Netherlands by residents of the former Dutch East Indies

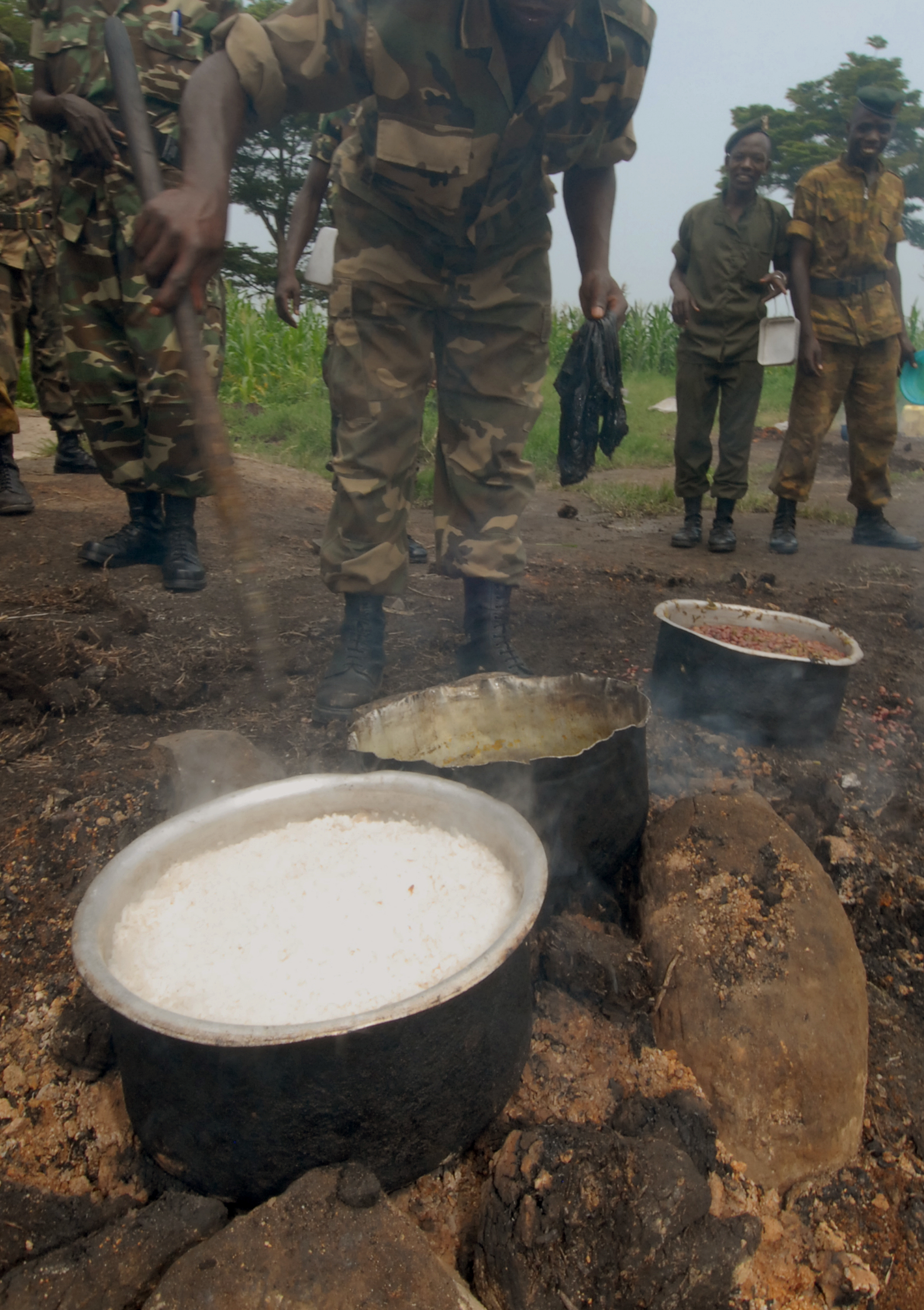
Burundian soldiers cooking in a sufuria over an open fire

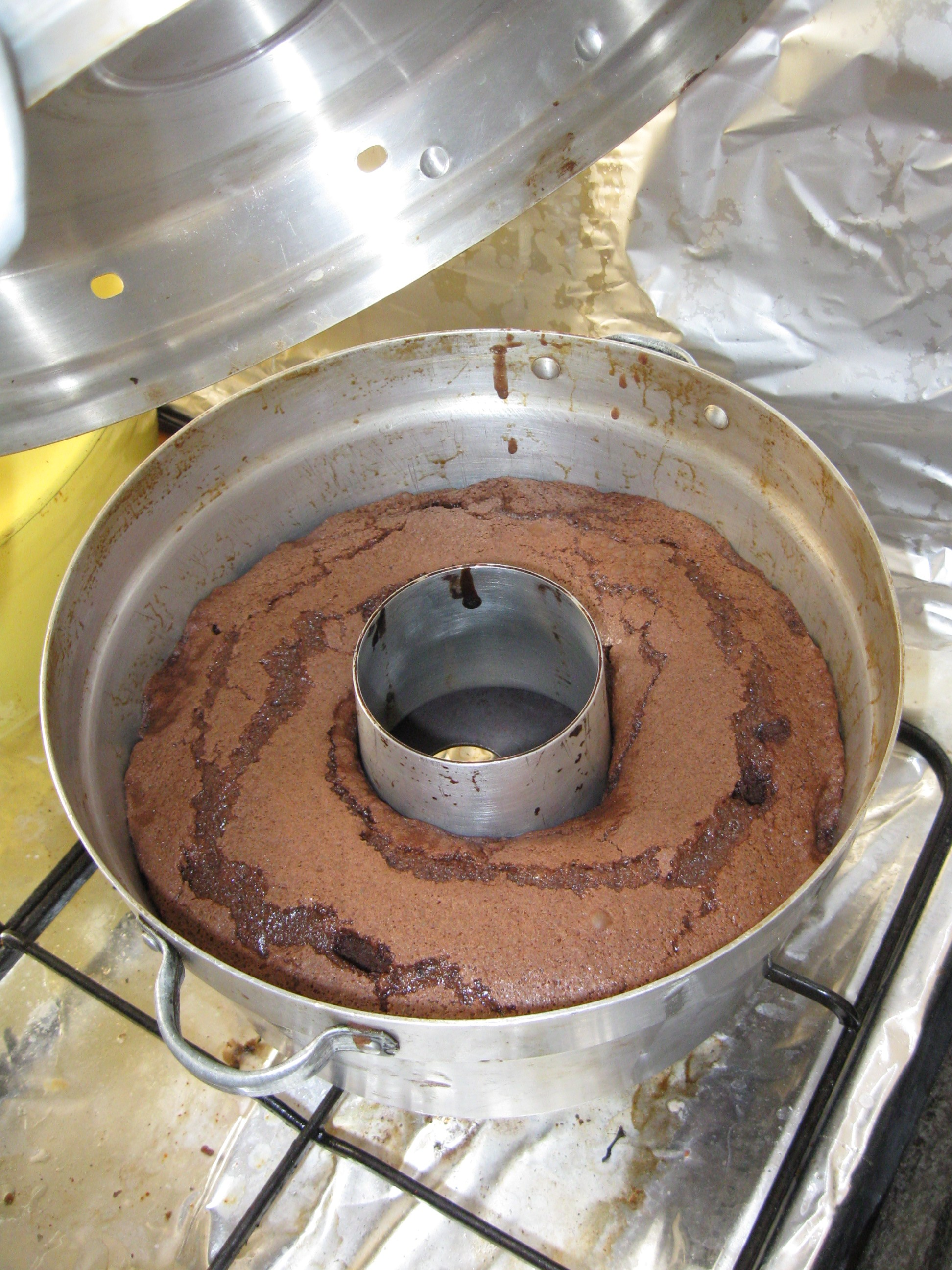
A brownie cake baked in a Wonder Pot

== See also ==
- Boiling vessel
- Cooker
- Cousances
- Fire pot
- Kitchenware
- List of cast-iron cookware manufacturers
- List of cooking appliances
- List of cooking techniques
- List of food preparation utensils
- Non-stick surface
- Sous-vide
- Thermal cooking
