= Mold (cooking implement) =

Container for holding and shaping food

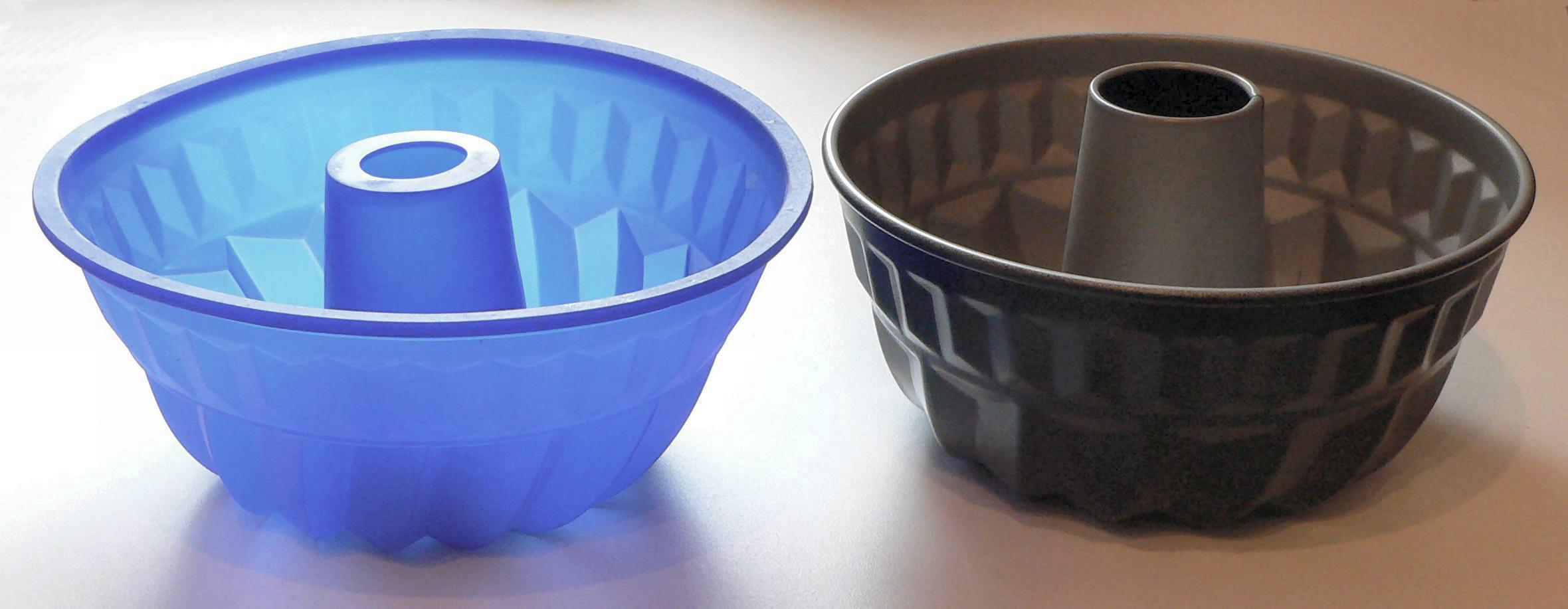
Bundt-style silicone and metal pans (2008)

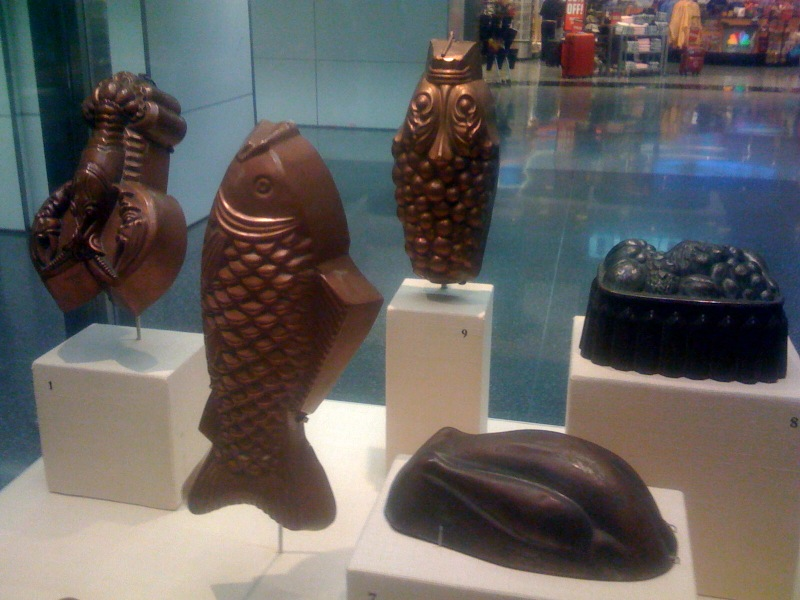
Late 19th- and early 20th-century food molds

A mold or mould (British English), is a container used in various techniques of food preparation to shape the finished dish. The term may also refer to a finished dish made in said container (e.g. a jello mold).

== Types ==
Molds can be used for a variety of foods:

- Cake molds (e.g. muffin tins, Bundt cake, angel food cake pans, and other types of bakeware)
- Springform pan
- Gelatin dessert molds (also known as "jelly molds")
- Ice cream and other frozen desserts
- Mousse
- Butter

== See also ==
- List of cooking vessels
- List of food preparation utensils
- Bowl
- Molding (process)
- Pastry
