= Handi =

Cooking vessel from the Indian subcontinent

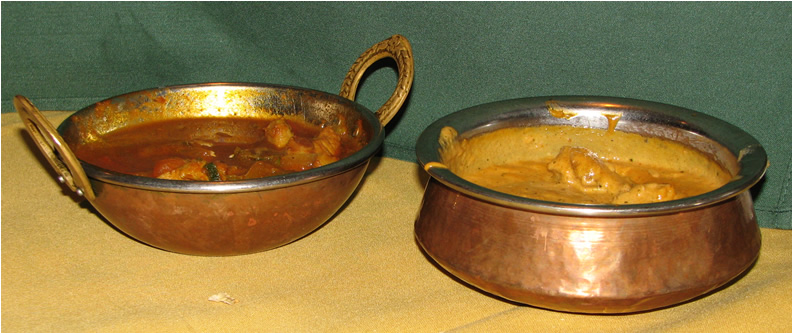
A small decorative karahi (left) and handi (right) used to serve Indian food

A handi (Hindi: हांड़ी) is a cooking basin made from copper or clay (pot) originating in the Indian subcontinent used primarily in Indian, Pakistani and Bangladeshi cooking.

This vessel is deep and has a broad mouth. Since there are a wide variety of dishes cooked throughout the Indian subcontinent using the handi, their names associated with this vessel vary – such as Chicken Handi, Handi Paneer, or Handi Komdi.

Due to the vast differences in language and culture from region to region in the Indian subcontinent, differing names are given to the handi. This includes tasla, tasli, karahi, degchi and ahuna.

The handi is also physically likened to American beanpots and Spanish ollas among others.

It is also a major component of the Dahi Handi festival that is celebrated annually to mark the celebration of the birth of Krishna – a Hindu God.

== Uses of the handi ==
The handi is utilised mainly for cooking purposes, especially for slow-cooking. For example, when any dish is cooked in the handi – the lid is sealed to it, using dough so steam cannot escape, preserving the nutrients in the food. In turn this also allows for the food to be cooked using its own water content, accentuating its flavour and tang.

== Dishes cooked in the handi ==
There are many dishes that are cooked using the Handi. Many of the dishes’ names actually incorporate the word ‘Handi’ into it. Some of these dishes include:

- Reshmi Handi (Silken Pot) a commonly eaten dish in Mughlai Cuisini
- Handi Biryani
- Handi Khichdi
- Diwani Handi
- Handi Paneer
- Handi Komdi
- Handi Corn Sabzi
- Laziz Lamb Handi
- Khade Masala Ka Ghost

== Significance of the Dahi Handi festival ==
The Dahi Handi festival is a Hindu festive event, that occurs to celebrate the birth of Krishna (a Hindu Deity), which is also known as Krishna Janmashtami. The festival is held annually around August to September, with dates varying year to year.

Krishna is believed to be the eighth avatar of the Lord Vishnu, who was born to get Mathura saved from the cruel king Kamsa. He was born of Kamsa’s sister; Devaki, and her husband Vasudeva. However, in order to survive from Kamsa’s cruel and wrathful ways, Krishna was raised by his foster parents Nanda and Yashoda in the village of Gokul, Vrindavan.

There is a legend regarding Lord Krishna. Krishna was raised in a village in northern India, called Vrindavan, in the state of Uttar Pradesh. He used to love a variety of dairy products, especially white butter (Makhan) whilst growing up as a child. Because of this, he even used to steal dairy produce from neighbours in the village, and from surrounding villages too. Due to these activities, Krishna gained the reputation of being a Makhan Chor or Navneet Chor (thief of butter). His foster mother Yashoda started to get frustrated by his stealing habits. Thus she told the women in the village and surrounding villages to tie their dairy produce in a handi, especially Makhan at a height Krishna would not be able to reach. Yashoda also used to restrain him as much as she could. However, Krishna using his wit would gather his friends and other children to form a human pyramid (as they do now every year) to break handis hanging on the ceilings in houses of the neighbourhood to steal curd and butter – which is why they have yoghurt or other dairy hanging in the handi during present festivals.

Another legend that exists is that supposedly, the king Kamsa during Krishna’s times denied children sufficient nourishment through the seizing of dairy products, even though there was an abundance of it. Hence, Krishna and his peers would steal and distribute the dairy products among themselves. A major event that occurs during the festival is the sport that is played – called Dahi Handi. It involves the hanging of the handi that is filled with Dahi (yoghurt) at a difficult height to reach – usually at 30 ft.

Then young boys and men create teams to form a large human pyramid to try to reach and break open the pot. Girls on the ground form circles around the pyramid – sing songs and dance. It often becomes very competitive between teams, with the winning team achieving some sort of prize for breaking the pot. The teams that play this sport are highly dedicated, especially in the states of Maharashtra and Gujarat. They practice weeks ahead of the festival, often involving lots of focus, coordination and most of all enthusiasm.

One human pyramid can have as many as nine layers to it. The lower levels or layers have the stronger, sturdier people who can bear lots of mass on their shoulders. As you go up the levels, the lighter the boys get, with the top-most boy being the lightest, smallest and has the most energy who can break open the handi. The persons that form the pyramid are called ‘Govinda Pathak’ or ‘Govinda.’ Every year at this festival, many a team participate mostly in the states of Maharashtra and Gujarat, with the winning team being rewarded usually in the form of money, sweets or other prizes. The Dahi Handi itself usually contains yoghurt, ghee, sometimes milk and some forms of nuts like almonds.

Not all attempts for every group are successful. People often end up tumbling down from the top to the bottom of the human pyramid, which not only is very painful but can be quite dangerous, sometimes causing serious injury.

The community including the neighbourhood where the event occurs gather in large numbers. Many of them throw water balloons, and buckets of water down on the participating teams adding a modern touch to the festival. Due to the atmospheric pressure and excitement leading up to the festival, the teams have lots of adrenaline running through their blood, motivating them to break the Dahi Handi.

Prior to and following the ceremony of breaking open the handi, folk dances are performed by members of the team and surrounding people. One such dance ‘Jhaanki,’ which is a special dance to admire Lord Krishna. Others include ‘Lavani,’ which are organised and performed to keep the spectators entertained and add variation to the event. Lavani is a form of dance popular in Maharashtra, India typically performed to the Dholki, an Indian percussion instrument.

There are however many issues that have arisen due to this festival. This includes excessive littering by the public every year. There is also lots of congestion in traffic that is caused during the day of the Dahi Handi festival. Another issue is that of significant sound pollution, which is enhanced with large crowds. The biggest issue of this festival is the increased risk of mortality amongst participants. Ever since 2000, because the festival became much more competitive, the number of injuries incurred has risen greatly compared to previous years. To reduce the risk of injury it has been proposed on multiple occasions to lower the height of the handi, whilst also making it mandatory for participants to wear protective gear. In 2014 Maharashtra's government placed a ban on children under the age of 12 participating in the Dahi Handi festival.

== See also ==
- Indian pottery
- List of cooking vessels
