= Sufuria =

Cooking pot or container used in Africa

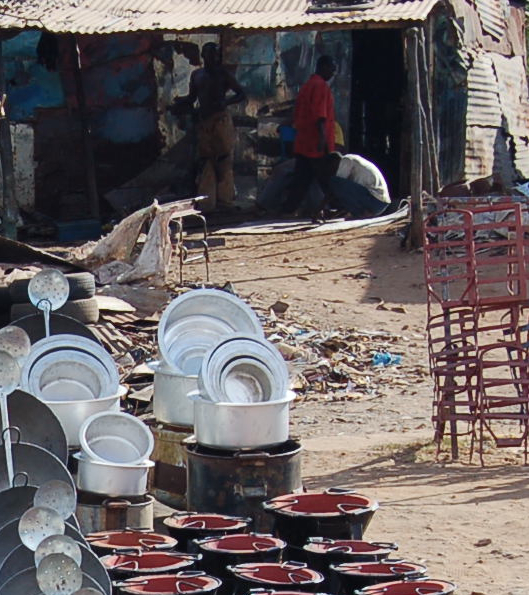
Various sizes of sufuria (center) displayed along with jiko braziers (foreground) at a metalworker's shop in Malindi, Kenya

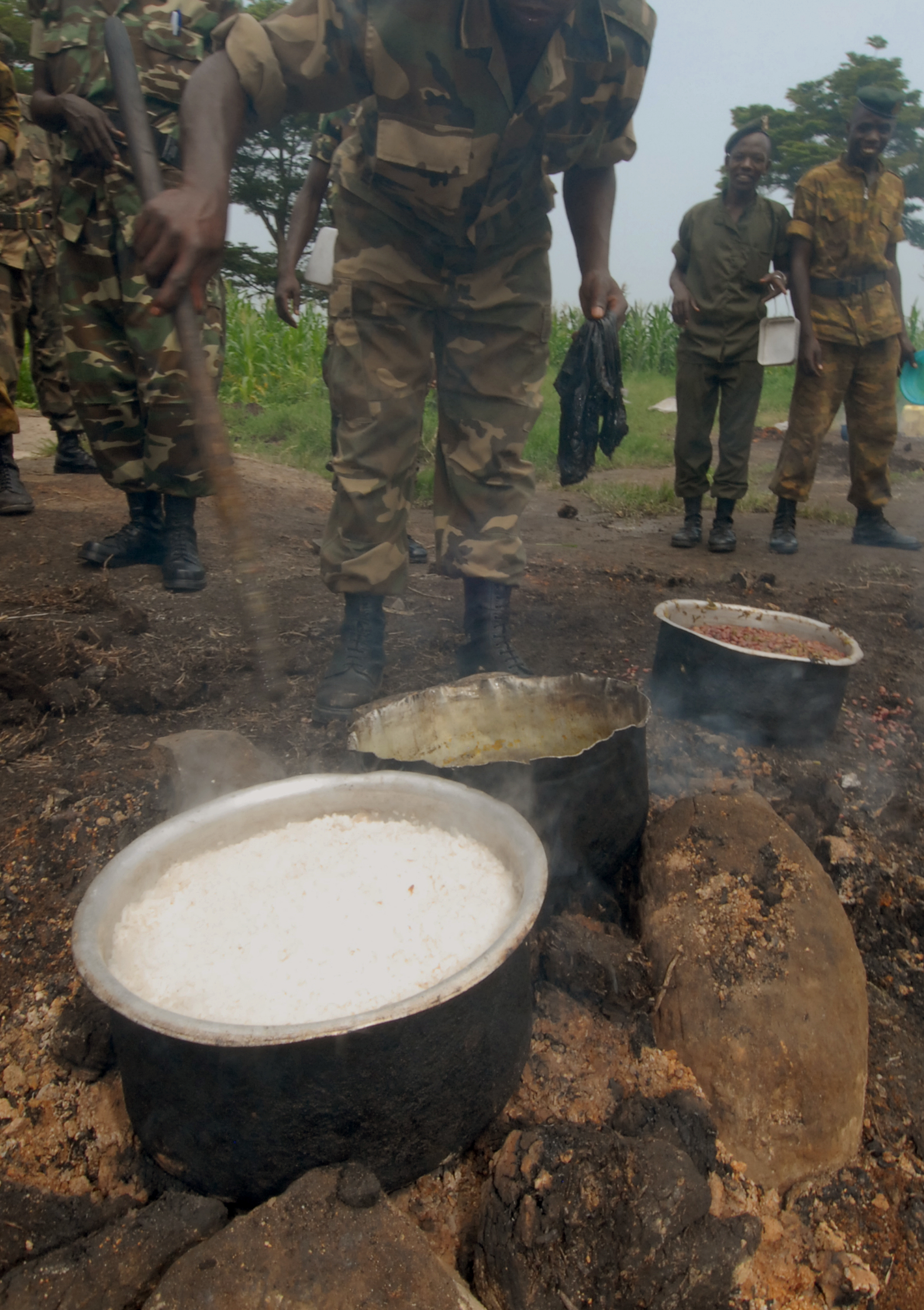
Burundian soldiers cooking in sufuria over an open fire

A sufuria (Swahili sufuria; English plural sufurias) is a Swahili language word, adopted in the local African Great Lakes regional variety of English, for a flat-based, deep-sided, lipped and handleless cooking pot or container. It is ubiquitous in Kenya, Tanzania and other Great Lakes nations. A replacement for more traditional crockery containers (ek fara), it is used in many Kenyan households for cooking, serving and storing food. Most sufuria are today made of aluminum, and produced and purchased locally in the informal sector. Sufuria were traditionally used to cook over open fire, a charcoal brazier (a jiko), or coals, and are purchased in a variety of sizes, with and without lids.

== See also ==
- List of cooking vessels
