= Fish kettle =

Large, oval-shaped kettle used for cooking whole fish

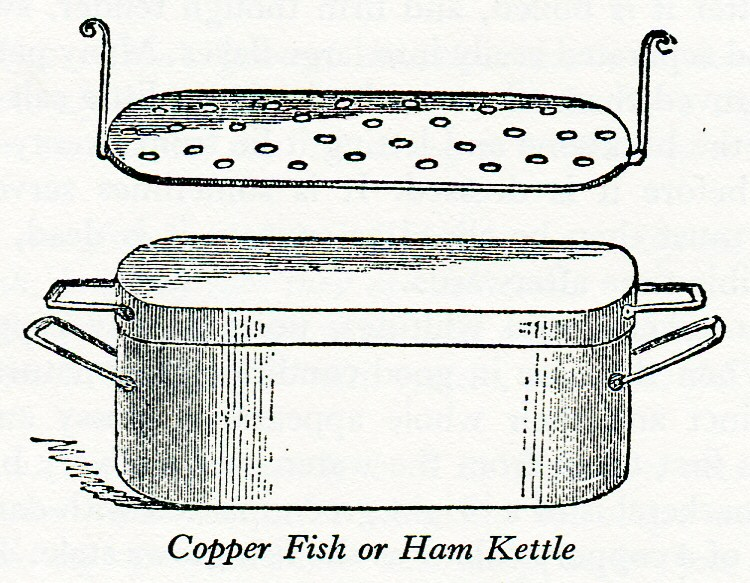
Wood engraving depicting a copper fish kettle

A fish kettle is a kind of large, oval-shaped kettle used for cooking whole fish. Owing to their necessarily unwieldy size, fish kettles usually have racks and handles, and notably tight-fitting lids.

Larousse Gastronomique describes the fish kettle as "a long, deep cooking receptacle with two handles, a grid, and a lid. The fish kettle is used to cook whole fish, such as hake, salmon, pike, in a court-bouillon. The removable grid enables the fish to be taken out without breaking it."

== See also ==
- List of cooking vessels
