= Bratt pan =

Heavy-duty cooking pan

Bratt pan is a heavy-duty industrial cooking appliance that can perform multiple functions: boiling, steaming, stewing, simmering, roasting, poaching, braising, shallow frying and deep frying. They all possess a tilting feature, which is either electrically or hand operated. Bratt pans are typically found in commercial establishments where mass catering is required such as restaurants, canteens, hospitals and schools.

The term ‘bratt pan’ stems from the German word for fry – brat. Bratt pans contain rectangular deep pots with counter-balanced lids which you can pull down. The heating source is powered through gas or electrical means.

== See also ==
- List of cooking vessels
