= Beanpot =

Cooking vessel

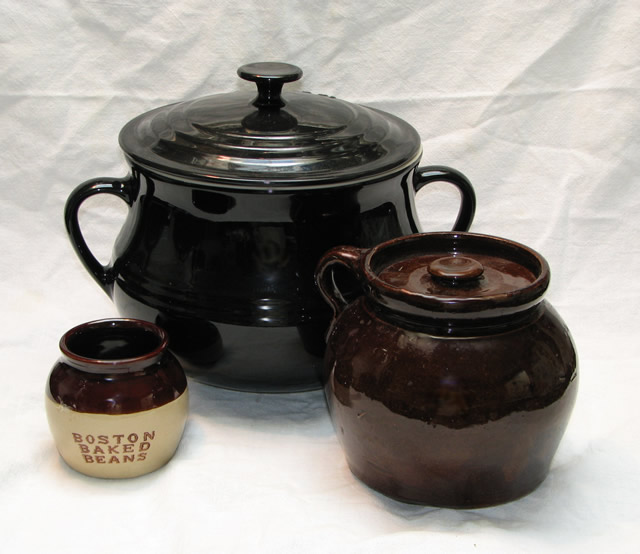
Three-quart, one-quart (antique), and half-pint (souvenir) beanpots

A beanpot is a deep, wide-bellied, short-necked vessel used to cook bean-based dishes. Beanpots are typically made of ceramic, though some are made of other materials, such as cast iron. The relatively narrow mouth of the beanpot minimizes evaporation and heat loss, while its deep, wide, thick-walled body facilitates long, slow cooking times.

Beanpots are commonly associated with New England, in particular Boston, Massachusetts. This association is evident in the nickname Beantown, and the use of the name beanpot for Boston events such as the Beanpot ice hockey tournament.

Beanpots resemble the Indian handi and the Spanish, Mexican or Native American olla, and may be related to the latter vessel.

== See also ==
- Baked beans
- Cassole
- Guernsey bean jar
- Handi
- List of cooking vessels
- Olla
- Slow cooker
- Tangia
