= Crepulja =

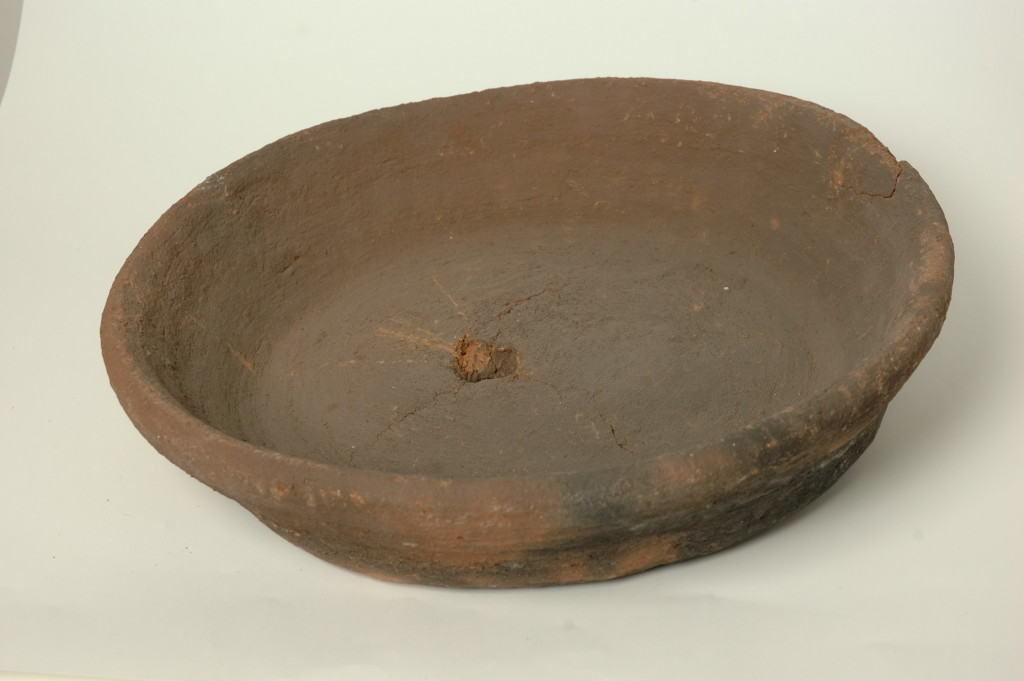
A crepulja from the archaeological site Lazarev Grad

A crepulja is a traditional Serbian shallow clay container with a little hole in the middle. It is between 25–60 cm in diameter, the height of the pan is 7–13 cm, and the walls are 3–5 cm thick. The clay is treaded by stepping over the mud, mixed with raw horse dung, goat hairs, oat straw or chaff. The container is modelled by hand and the finished pan is burnished using wet hands or coated with rarified mud. This could also be done with watered dung. Drying happens in the open for several months, finally the container is fired by placing it over a fire with the inner surface towards the fire.

It is put on a fire until well-heated, then lifted with a hook, and dough is put into it and it is covered with a sač, which is covered with ashes and live coals. In that way the bread is baked on both sides: on the lower side from the heated crepulja and on top from the live coals.

== See also ==
- List of cooking vessels
