= Caquelon =

Ceramic pot used for cheese fondue

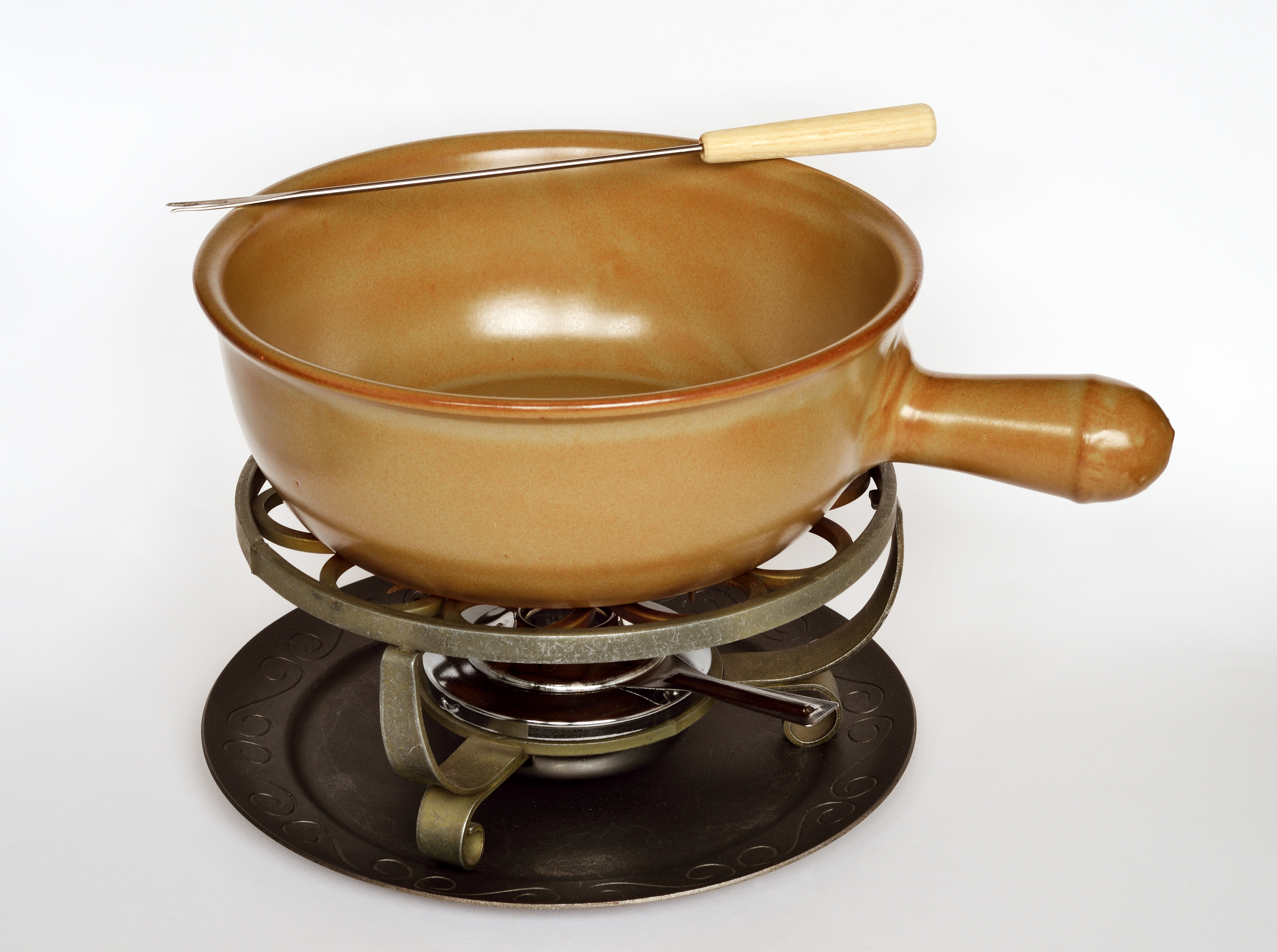
Caquelon on a stove

A caquelon (French: [kaklɔ̃]), also called a fondue pot, is a cooking vessel of stoneware, ceramic, enamelled cast iron, or porcelain for the preparation of fondue.

The word caquelon is from a Swiss French term originating in the 18th century derived from the Alsatian word kakel (akin to German Kachel, "glazed tile") referring to an earthenware casserole. The term is in common use throughout Switzerland, and in the Franche-Comté and Provence regions of France.

The bottom of a caquelon requires a thickness sufficient to prevent burning of the melted cheese when the vessel is placed over a spirit burner at the table. Nevertheless, an encrusted layer of cheese forms on the bottom (called Grossmutter in German, religieuse in French) which is released when the fondue has been consumed and is shared between the diners.

== See also ==
- List of cooking vessels
