= Marmite (cooking dish) =

Cooking vessels

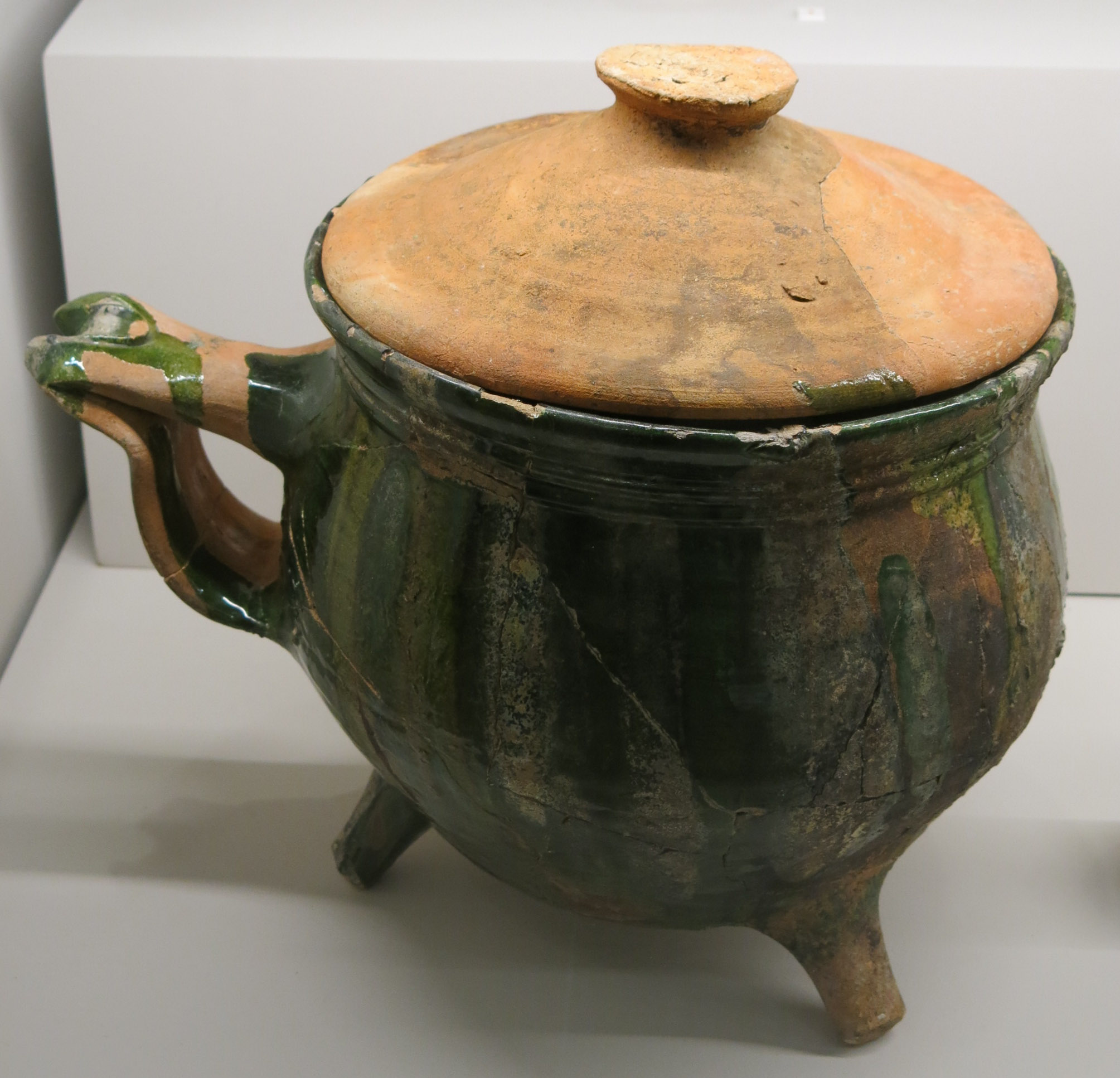
A marmite, c. 1625–1650, found during the excavations of the Louvre Palace

A marmite (pronounced [maʁˈmit]) is a traditional crockery casserole vessel found in France. It is famed for its "pot-belly" shape.

According to the French culinary reference work Le Répertoire de la Cuisine, a marmite can be either a stock pot or "a French pot with lid similar to a casserole with two finger-grips on each side."

The term was adopted for Marmite, a British savoury spread, and marmitako, a Basque tuna dish.

== See also ==
- List of cooking vessels
