= Cataplana =

Cookware used for Portuguese seafood dishes

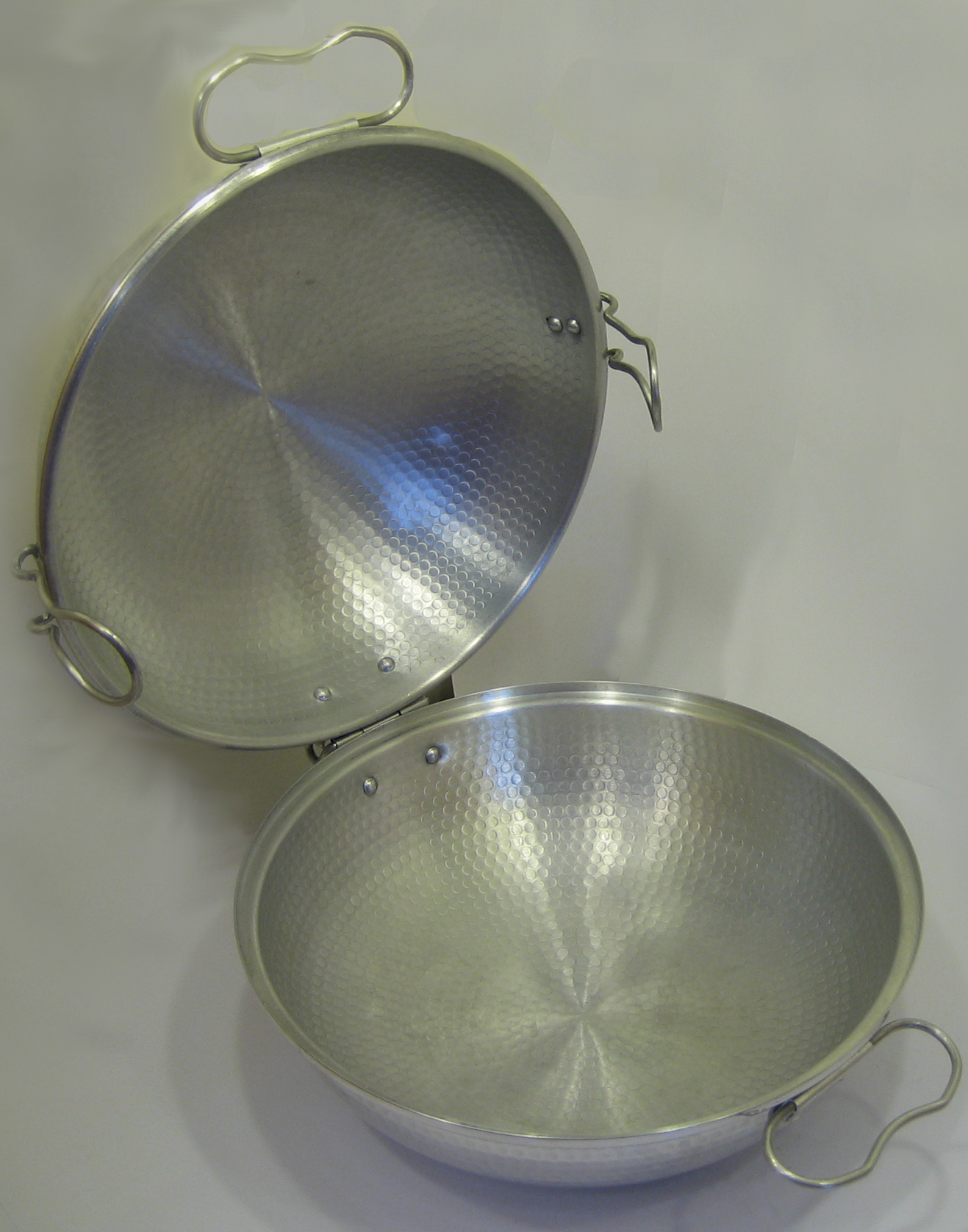
Open cataplana

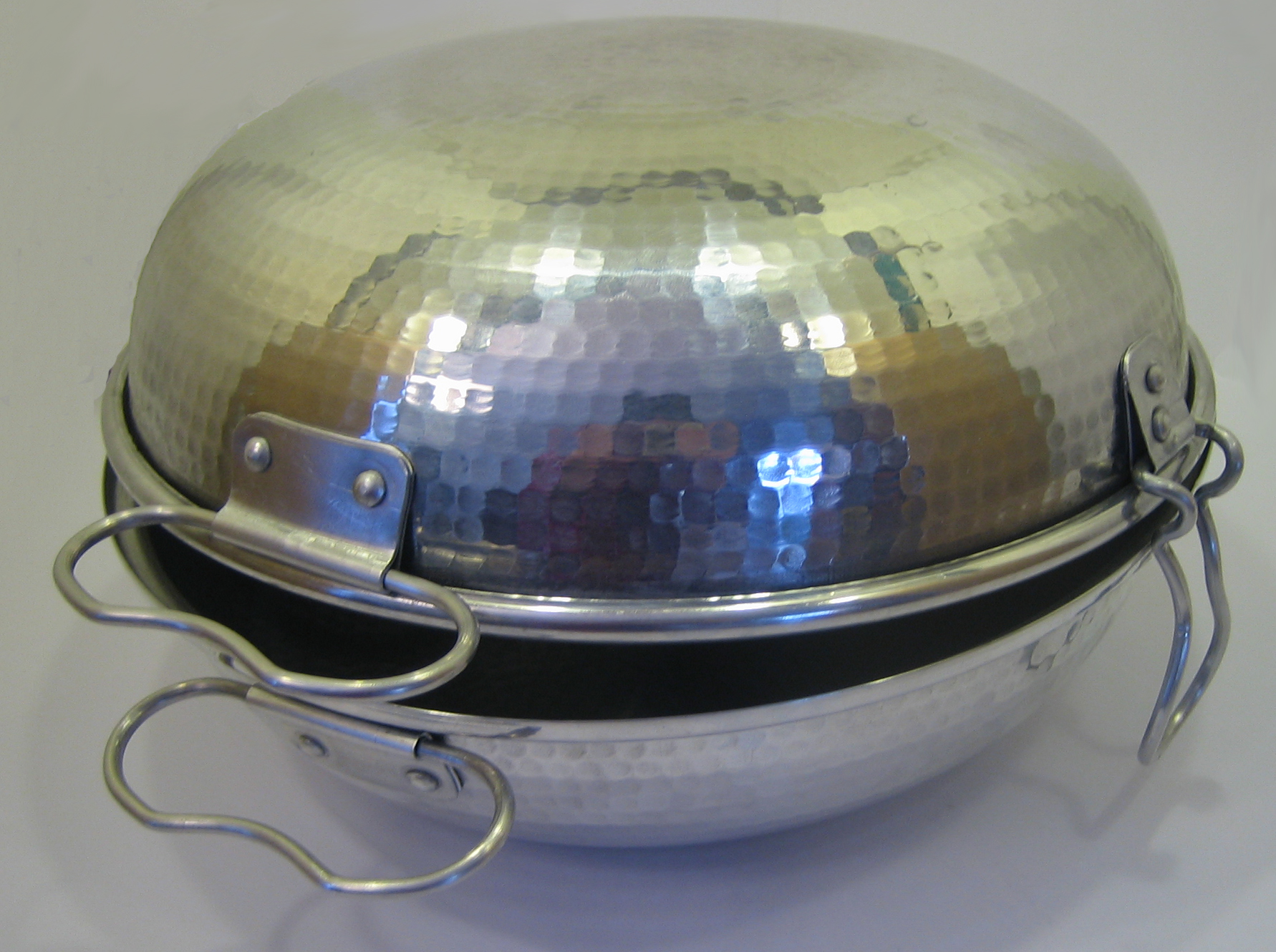
Closed cataplana

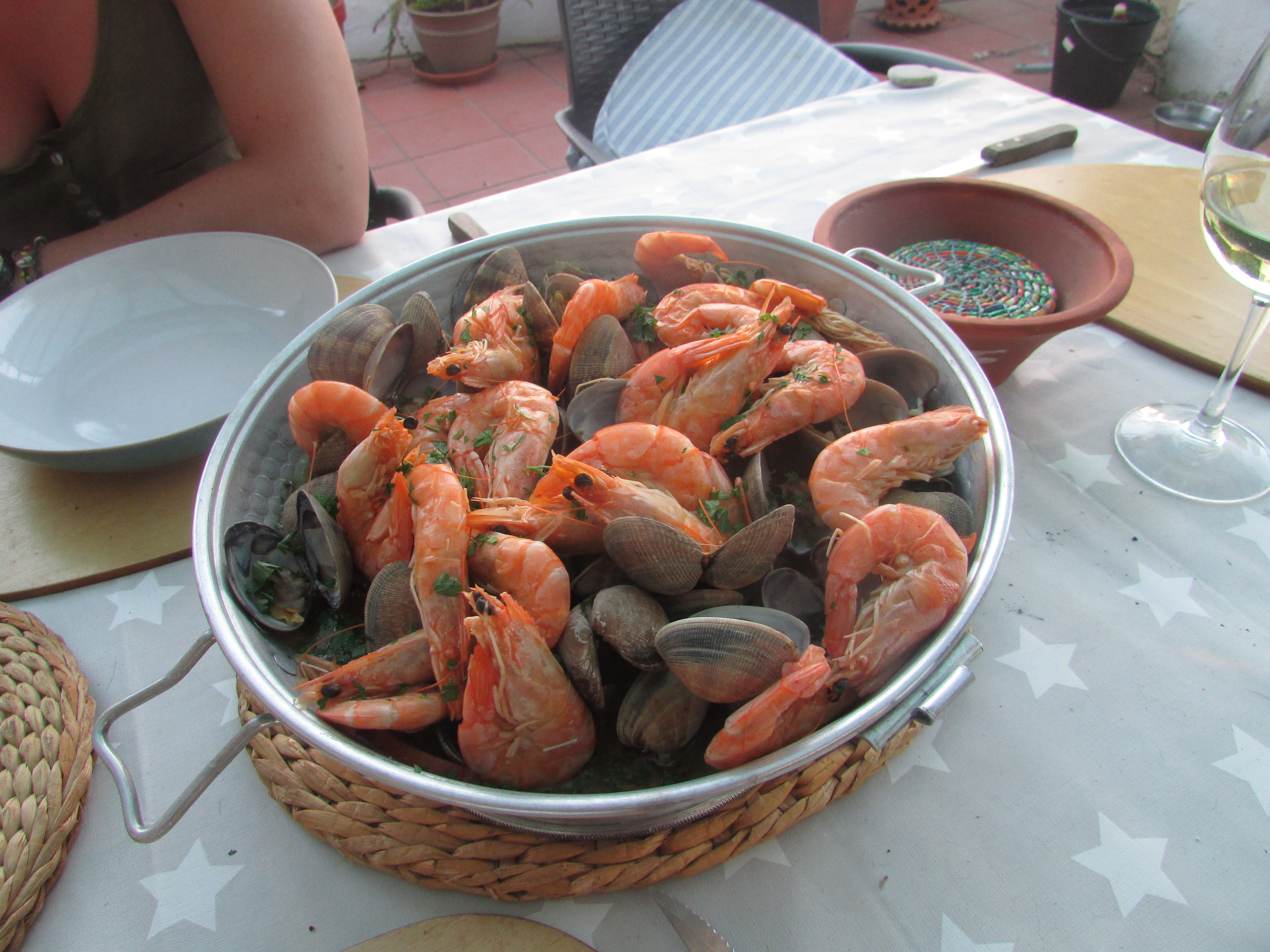
Clams in a cataplana

A cataplana is an item of cookware used to prepare Portuguese seafood dishes, popular in the country's Algarve region. The cataplana is also the name of a typical dish of Algarve region as well as a Portuguese item of cookware used to make the dish and a method of cooking using it. The cooking vessel can be used for cooking a wide variety of ingredients, but prawns, clams and pork cataplanas are the most popular menus of the cataplana dish.

According to The Oxford Companion to Food, the most famous dish made in a cataplana is amêijoas na cataplana (clams in cataplana). The cataplana is traditionally made of copper and shaped like two clamshells hinged at one end and able to be sealed using a clamp on each side of the assembly, enabling the vessel to function as a crude pressure cooker. Cataplanas can also be made of aluminium.

Cataplana is a typical dish from Algarve cooked in a metallic cataplana whose ingredients typically include onion, red and green peppers and tomatoes, cooked in olive oil, garlic, tarragon, parsley and white wine, among other ingredients like cubed pork, chouriço sausage, chicken, fish, prawns, clams or other seafood. This can generate a plethora of variations. The dish called cataplana is always made using the traditional item of cookware also called a cataplana, which steams the ingredients during the final part of the cooking process.

== See also ==
- List of cooking vessels
