= Roasting pan =

Piece of cookware

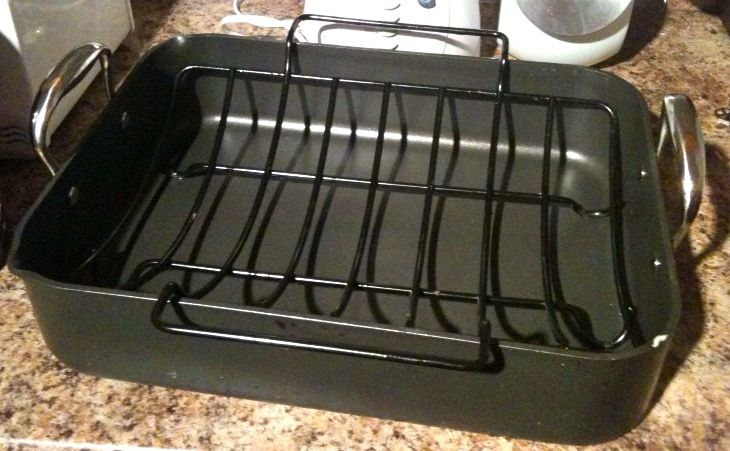
A large roasting pan with a removable rack and a non-stick surface coating.

A roasting pan or dripping pan is a piece of cookware used for roasting meat in an oven, either with or without vegetables or other ingredients. A roasting pan may be used with a rack that sits inside the pan and lets the meat sit above the fat and juice drippings.

A shallow roasting pan is normally used for roasting small cuts of meat, but large-size roasting pans are also used for cooking large poultry such as turkey or goose, or for larger cuts of meat. A deep roasting pan can hold vegetables and other ingredients that meat can sit on rather than a rack, letting the vegetables absorb the fat and juices from the meat while cooking. A deep roasting pan can also be used as a baking dish or basin, holding smaller baking dishes that must be surrounded by boiling water.

== Materials ==
Roasting pans are made in various materials that offer different benefits:

- Aluminum foil: inexpensive and disposable after one use
- Stainless steel: may have a non-stick coating
- Coated enamelware: has a non-stick surface
- Cast iron: cast-iron cookware conducts heat well and can be used to brown meat on the stovetop before placing into the oven for roasting
- Clay cooker: a covered clay pot can brown food if the temperature of the oven is raised toward the end of cooking

== Covered or uncovered roasting pans ==
Covering or uncovering a roasting pan will depend upon the type of meat being roasted, or the recipe being followed. Generally, meat that is high in fat content, such as duck, has no need of being covered during roasting. A lean cut of meat, however, will benefit from being covered during a long roasting time, to retain juices and soften the meat (for example, in using a tajine for roasting meat).

== Roasting racks ==
A roasting rack may be an accessory part of the roasting pan. A rack may be horizontal and lay flat on the roasting pan, or it may be a standing rack that sits vertically in the pan. A standing rack is most commonly used for roasting poultry. A variation of the roasting pan standing rack is the beer can chicken recipe.

== See also ==
- Roasting
- Broiling
- List of cooking vessels
