= Swiss Diamond International =

Swiss Diamond
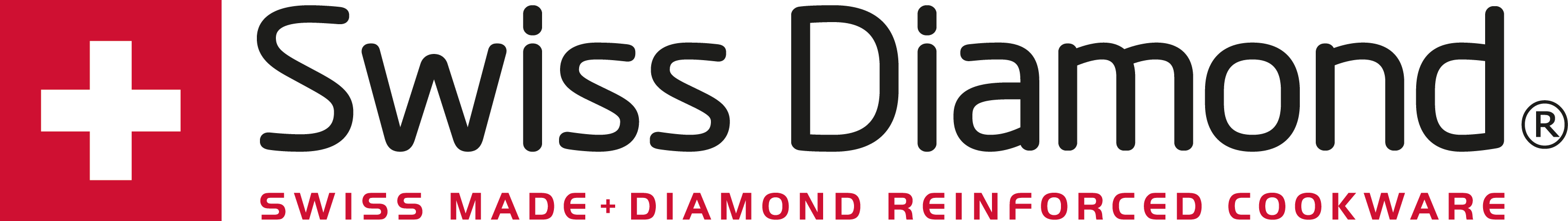
- Company type: Private
- Industry: Cookware
- Founded: 2001
- Headquarters: Sierre, Switzerland
- Area served: Worldwide
- Products: Cookware and bakeware
- Number of employees: 100
- Website: swissdiamond.com

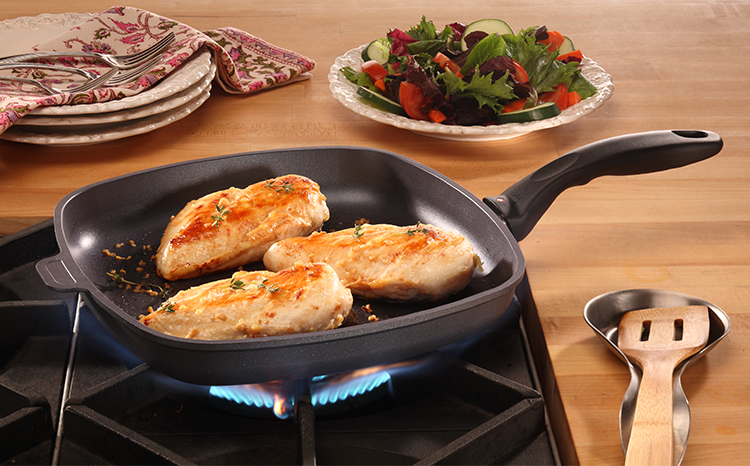
Square Grill Pan

Swiss Diamond International is a Swiss based cookware company. It is a privately held company, headquartered in Sierre, Switzerland and founded in 2001.

The company was founded to oversee production of cookware with the coating after it was awarded a gold medal at the International Inventor’s Fair in Geneva in 1999.

In addition to a variety of different cookware models, the brand features knives, blenders and a selection of silicone tools.

== History ==
=== HORT Coating Center ===
In 1974, HORT Coating Center SA was founded in Sierre, Switzerland as a research company that explored nonstick materials and coating surfaces. HORT used wet-spraying and powder-spraying processes to coat a wide range of products, including machinery parts for airplanes, coffee makers, and Swiss watches. Prior to 1999, HORT Coating Center used a titanium-reinforced Polytetrafluoroethylene nonstick coating.

In the early 1990s, the HORT Coating Center began testing methods for improving the coating, the main criteria being better hardness and thermal conductivity. These criteria led to diamonds, in the form of tiny particles. Diamonds are the hardest natural substance, and HORT discovered that their low coefficient of friction added to their utility as reinforcement for Polytetrafluoroethylene nonstick coatings. The Swiss Diamond "SD" coating was released after two years of preliminary testing to determine the most cost-effective formulation and application process.

=== Swiss Diamond International ===
In 1999, HORT Coating Center received the gold medal at the International Inventor’s Fair in Geneva, for the diamond-reinforced nonstick coating. Soon after, it was revealed that the coating could be used on not only machinery parts but also on nonstick cookware, which started to appear in the marketplace in the 1950s. In 2001, HORT Coating Center became the manufacturing center for Swiss Diamond International, dedicated to the production of nonstick cookware.

== Nonstick Coatings ==
=== HD Coating ===
As part of their research and development efforts, Swiss Diamond International developed a new formula for the coating in the early 2000s. The new coating is high-density, abbreviated "HD". By exchanging twenty per cent of the formula's components, the engineers were able to improve the coating's performance in industry-standard abrasion tests. The coating was improved by more than thirty percent in both nonstick release performance and longevity over time. The coating formula was patented by HORT Coating Center, and is used exclusively on Swiss Diamond cookware. In 2002, Swiss Diamond International released a line of induction cookware with the diamond reinforced coating.

=== XD Coating ===
Swiss Diamond also sells a proprietary XD coating as an alternative to their HD coating. The XD coating is more durable and has better food release properties.
