= Springform pan =

Type of bakeware

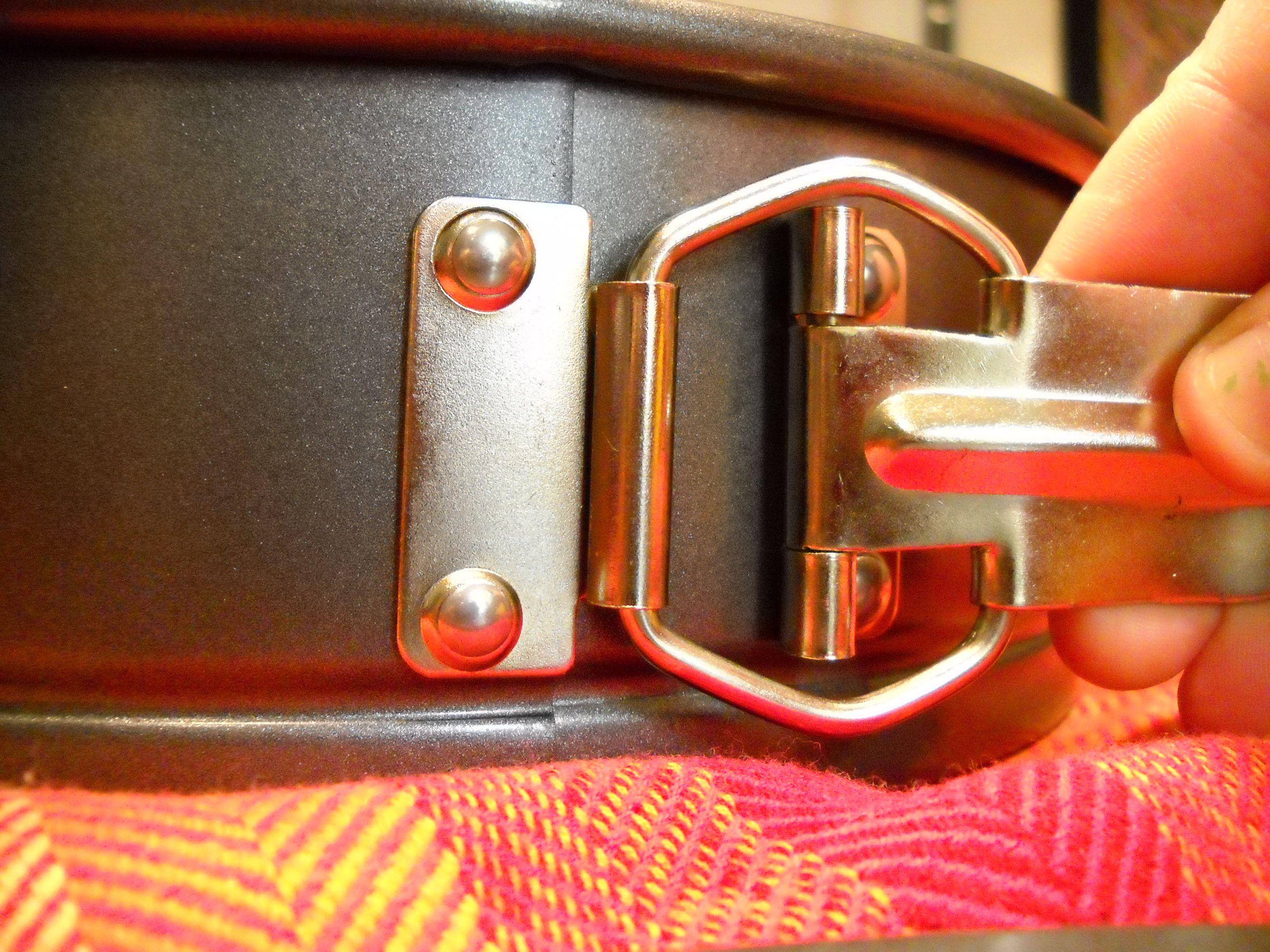
Close-up of spring

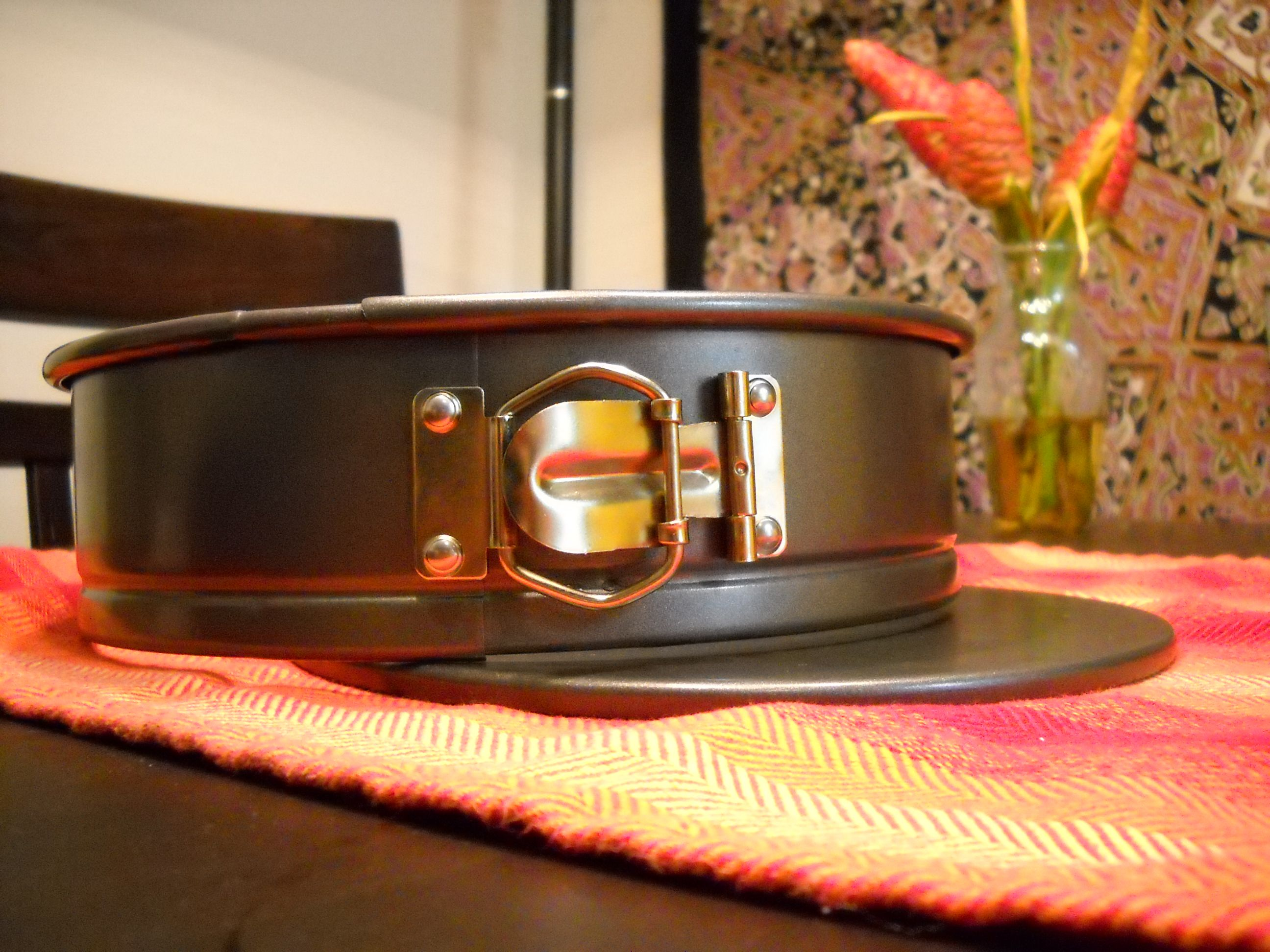
Base and wall belt

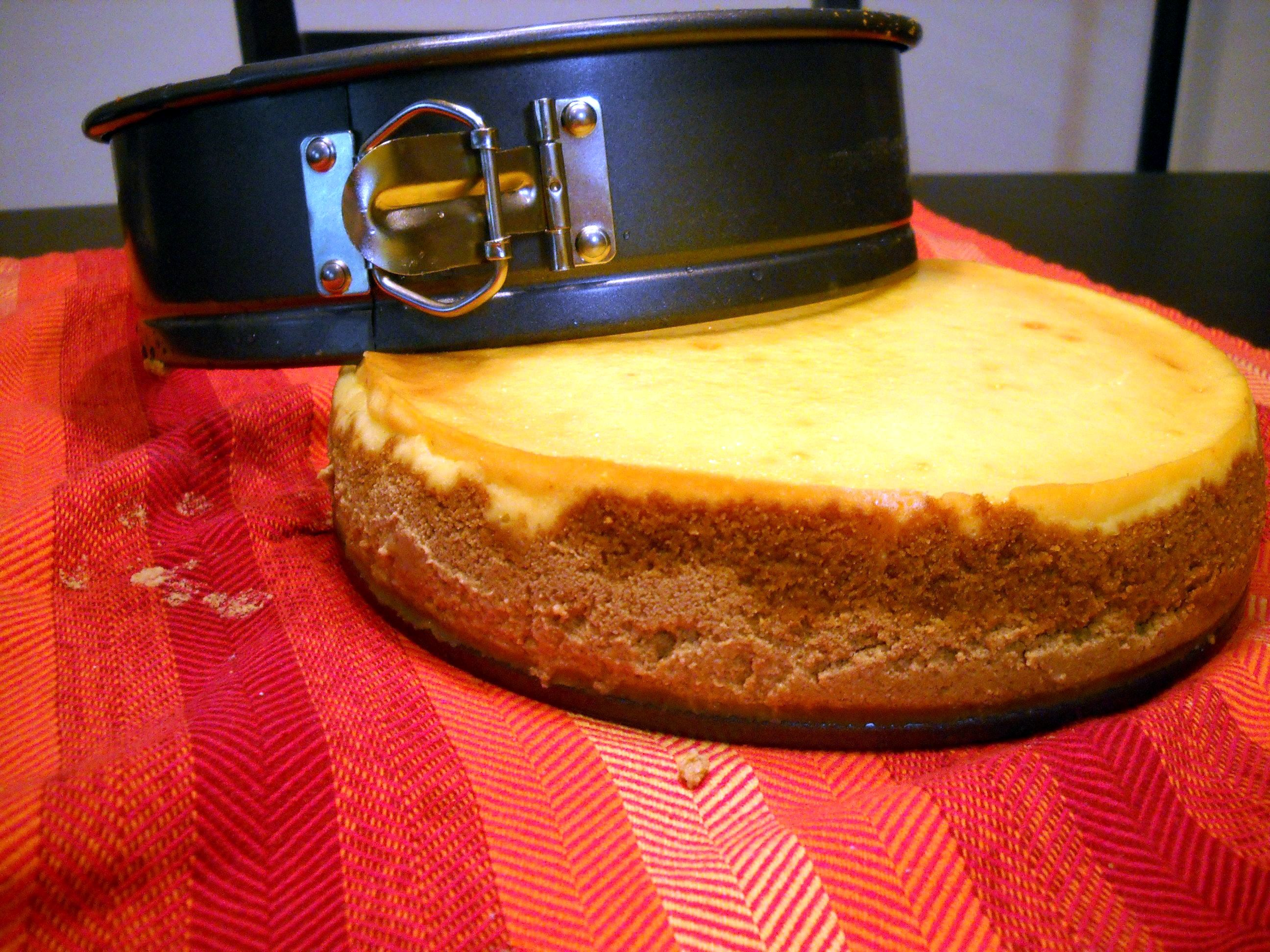
Pan with finished cheesecake

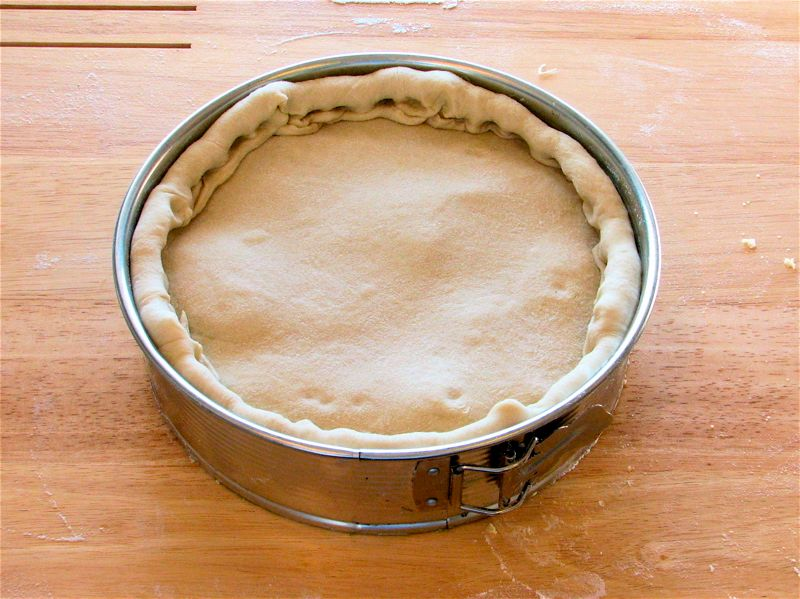
Springform pan used to make a Deep-dish pizza crust

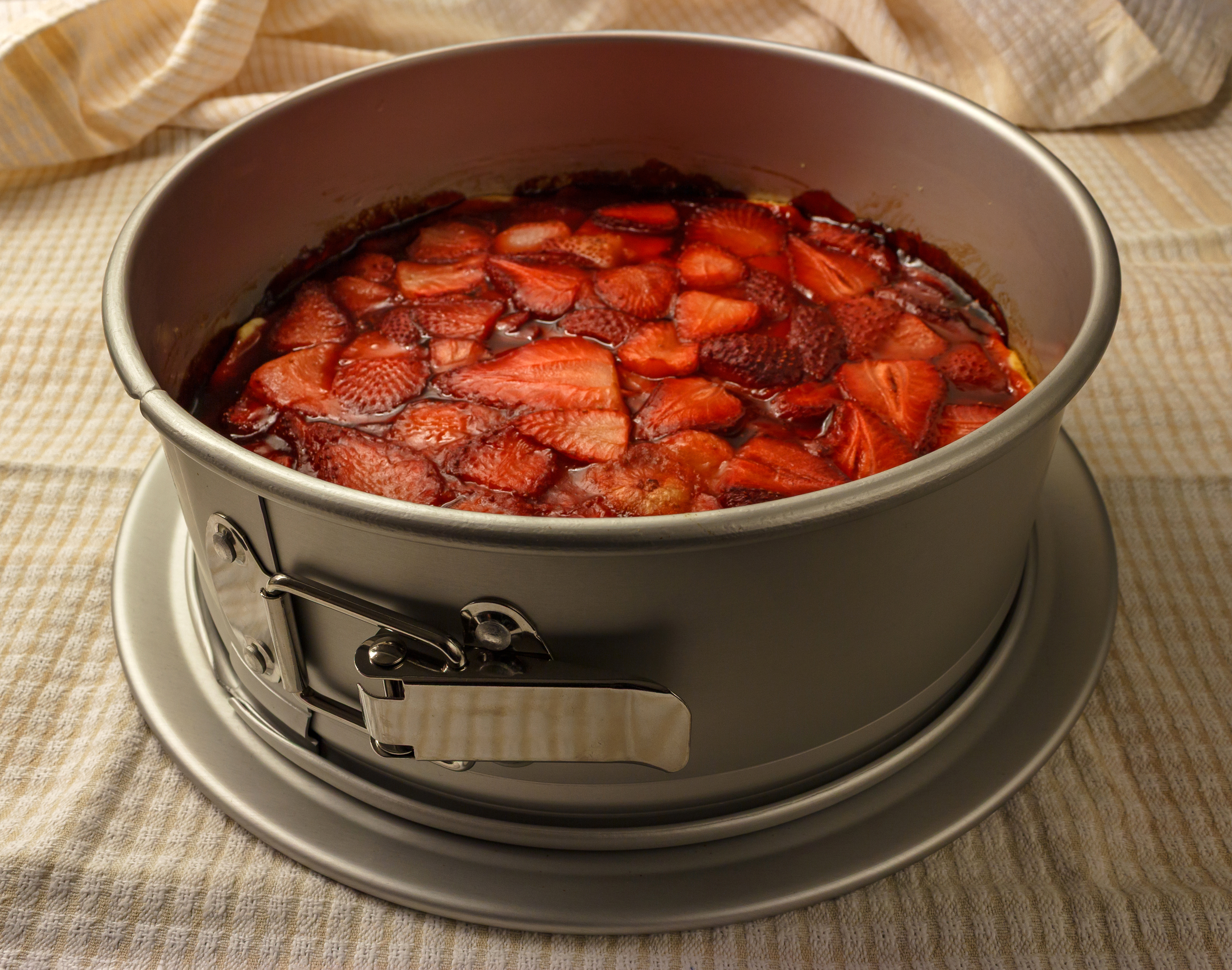
Springform pan with built-in drip tray

A springform pan is a type of bakeware that features sides that can be removed from the base. Springform refers to the construction style of this pan. The base and the sides are separate pieces that are held together when the base is aligned with a groove that rings the bottom of the walls. The pan is then secured by a latch on the exterior of the wall. This tightens the 'belt' that becomes the walls of the pan and secures the base into the groove at the base of the walls.

== Design ==
The most common springform pan is a round pan 9 inches (23 cm) in diameter. However, small circular pans are common along with squares, rectangles, and hearts. They come in a variety of materials including anodized aluminum, heavy-gauge steel, and glass. Optional features include a non-stick surface and a waterproofing seal around the base.

This pan is used to bake dishes that cannot be easily inverted for removal from the pan. Some of the most common recipes to call for springform pans are cheesecakes and tortes. The easy removal of the sides from a springform pan lends itself to dishes with delicate bottom layers such as the graham cracker crumb crusts commonly constructed for cheesecakes. Springform pans, however, are also used in the preparation of pizzas, quiches, and frozen desserts.

Although most cheesecakes are baked in a water bath, this does not mean that springform pans are waterproof around the base. Many may be waterproof initially. However, as the latch loosens and the coating wears off this waterproof feature will fade. For this reason many will wrap the pan in aluminum foil.

There are many types and finishes of springform pans. While the most common bottom is smooth, bottoms can also be waffled or glass.

== Springform pan alternatives ==
If a springform pan is unavailable, bakers may choose any of the following options:

1. serve cake from a pan
2. line cake pan with parchment paper
3. use a silicone pan
4. use a disposable aluminum pan
5. use a removable-bottom non-springform pan

== History ==
The springform was invented in Germany by the company CHG. At the time of founding CHG in 1882 produced many items related to baking. An example of a very early spring form is from a company catalog given out around the 1910's.

=== Catalogs ===
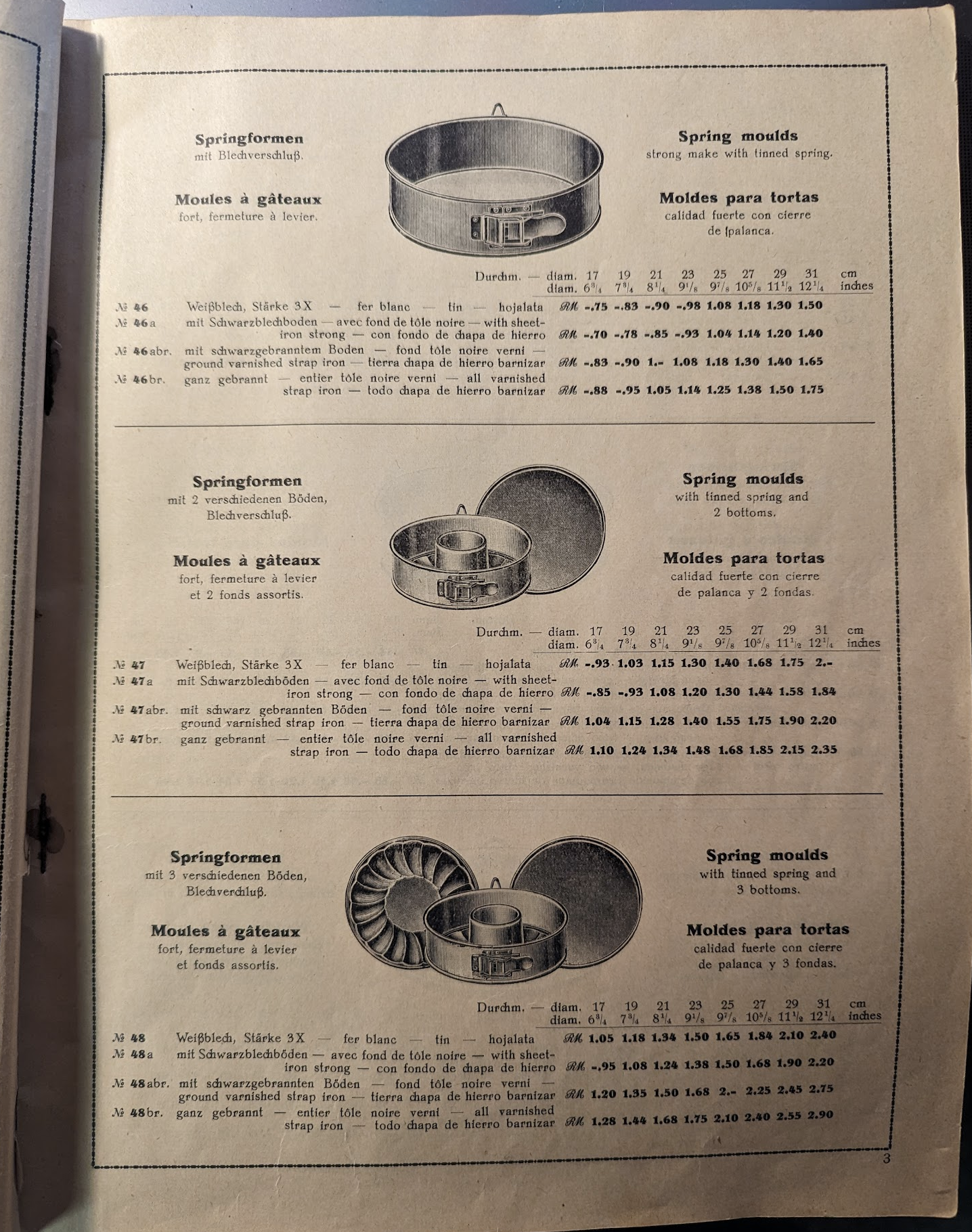
Page from early catalog showing for sale a springform

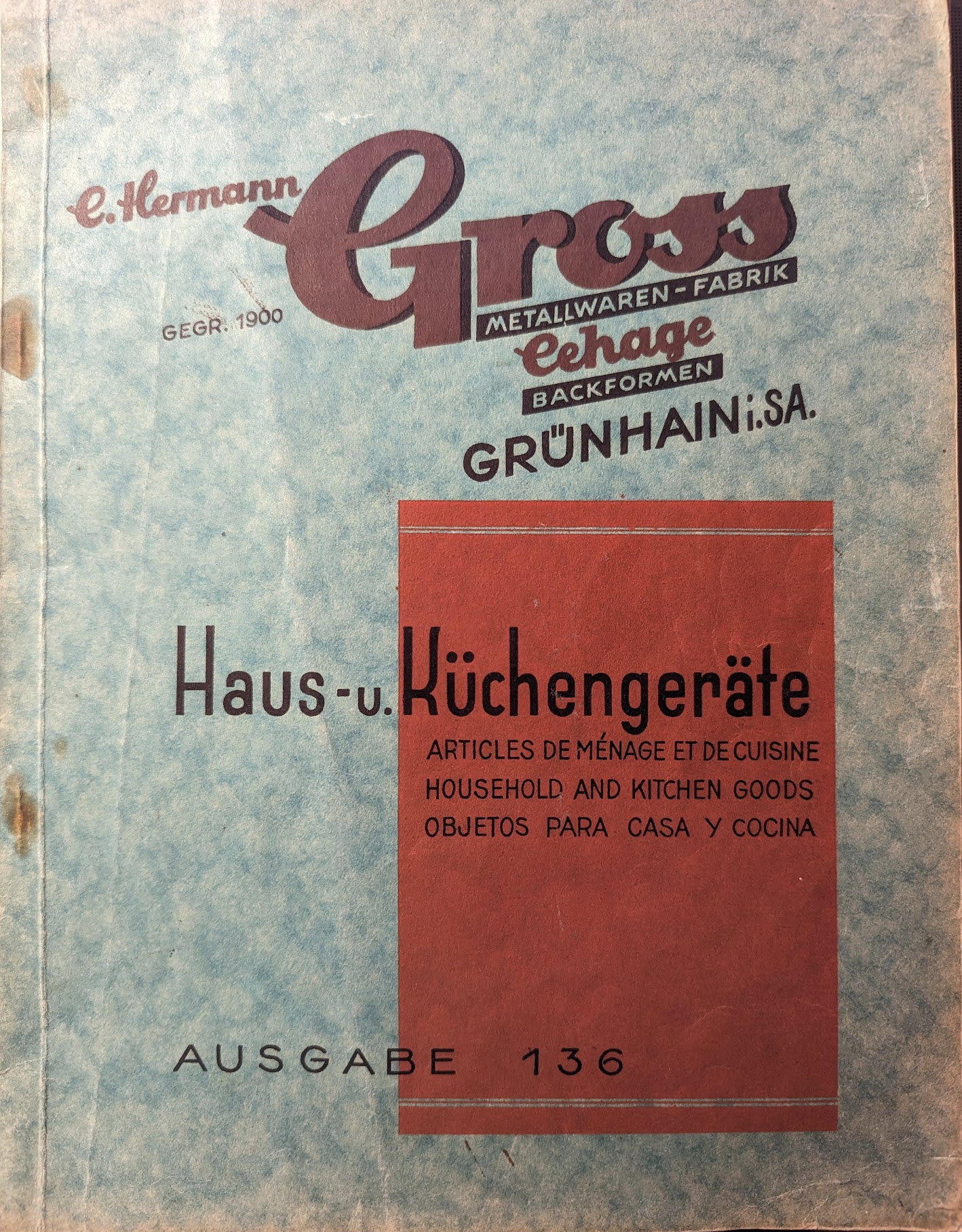
Early catalog cover from CHG

== See also ==
- Cookware and bakeware
- List of cooking vessels
- Cake pan
