= Surface chemistry of cooking =

In cooking several factors, including materials, techniques, and temperature, can influence the surface chemistry of the chemical reactions and interactions that create food. All of these factors depend on the chemical properties of the surfaces of the materials used. The material properties of cookware, such as hydrophobicity, surface roughness, and conductivity can impact the taste of a dish dramatically. The technique of food preparation alters food in fundamentally different ways, which produce unique textures and flavors. The temperature of food preparation must be considered when choosing the correct ingredients.

== Materials in cooking ==
The interactions between food and pan are very dependent on the material that the pan is made of. Whether or not the pan is hydrophilic or hydrophobic, the heat conductivity and capacity, surface roughness, and more all determine how the food is cooked.

=== Stainless steel ===
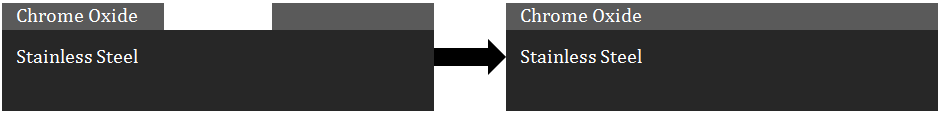
The self-healing properties of stainless steel are such that when part of the protective oxide layer gets scratched off, more of the steel reacts, leaving the surface protected again.

Stainless steel is considered stainless because it has at least 11% chromium by mass. Chromium is a relatively inert metal and does not rust or react as easily as plain carbon steel. This is what makes it an exceptional material for cooking. It is also fairly inexpensive, but does not have a very high thermal conductivity. From a surface standpoint, this is because of the thin layer of chromium oxide that is formed on the surface. This thin layer protects the metal from rusting or corroding. While it is protective, the oxide layer is not very conductive, which makes cooking food less efficient than it could be. For most cooking applications, high thermal conductivity is desirable to create an evenly heated surface on which to cook. In this way, stainless steel is usually not considered high-grade cookware.

In terms of surface interactions, chromium oxide is polar. The oxygen atoms on the surface have a permanent dipole moment, and are therefore hydrophilic. This means that water will wet it, but oils or other lipids will not.

=== Cast iron ===
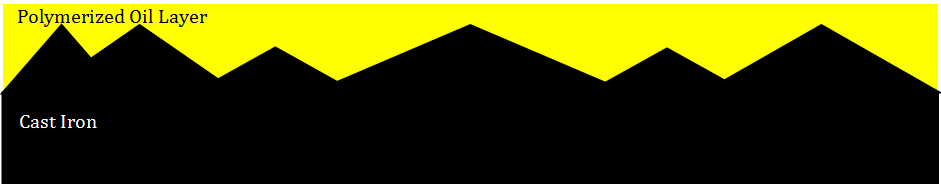
The rough surface of a cast iron pan with the polymerized oil layer that signifies that the pan is seasoned.

Cast-iron cookware is seasoned with oil. The surface of the cast iron is not very smooth; it has pits and peaks that are not conducive to cooking. Typically, the cookware is seasoned with oil. This process leaves a thin coat of oil in the pits and on top of the peaks on the surface of the pan. This thin coat actually polymerizes, making it durable and lasting. It also prevents the cast iron from rusting, which it is prone to do. The oil that is used in a seasoned pan combines with any liquid that is used in the cooking process and creates a good contact between pan and food. Even though the cast iron itself is a poor heat conductor, the oil makes the pan effective when it is at a high temperature.

The other effect that the seasoning oil has is to make the surface of a cast-iron pan hydrophobic. This makes the pan non-stick during cooking, since the food will combine with the oil and not the pan. It also makes the pan easier to clean, but eventually the polymerized oil layer which seasons it comes off and it needs to be re-seasoned.

=== Ceramic ===
Ceramic cookware (as in pans, not baking dishes) is not made of a solid ceramic, but rather is a metal pan, typically aluminum, with a nano-particle ceramic coating. This makes the surface rough on a small-scale and causes solutions to bead up more and not stick to the surface.

The downside is that the increased surface area means less surface contact with the food that is to be cooked and therefore has less heat transfer. Unfortunately, since the surface is fine, it can be scratched off over time, and the benefit from having it in the first place is lost.

=== Polytetrafluoroethylene (Teflon) ===
Polytetrafluoroethylene (commonly called by its DuPont brand name, Teflon) is a polymer that is used as a coating for non-stick cookware. The polymer is a polyethylene chain with fluorine atoms replacing the hydrogen atoms. The strength of the carbon-fluorine bonds makes it nonreactive to most things. Furthermore fluorine bonded to carbon tends to not form hydrogen bonds, and this along with the overall relatively weak London dispersion forces present result in Teflon poorly sticking to other substances. Teflon has the third lowest coefficient of friction of any known solid. It is also relatively cheap and very common.

The downsides of Teflon include the fact that it can be scratched off and get into food during the cooking process. Another problem is that Teflon begins to break down at around 350 °C and can give off poisonous fluorocarbon gasses. The final problem is that the bonding of Teflon to the pan uses a surfactant called perfluorooctanoic acid (PFOA), which can also break down at high temperatures and poison food. Modern pans no longer use PFOA as it's banned in the European Union.

=== Silicone ===
Silicone is a heat-resistant rubber that is inert and non-toxic. They are polymers that typically have a silicon–oxygen backbone with methyl ligands. The fairly inert methyl groups are not very reactive, giving the silicone a fairly low coefficient of friction. Just like Teflon, this makes them non-stick and easy to clean. They are also resistant to very high temperatures due to the strong bonds between all of the atoms. This means that they can be baked or used around hot oils.

Silicone has a very specific use as cookware, since it is not rigid. Most silicon used in cooking is in the form of spatulas or molds, and as such serve a different purpose than the previously discussed materials.

== Interaction of cooking techniques ==
Cooking techniques can be broken down into two major categories: Oil based and water based cooking techniques. Both oil and water based techniques rely on the vaporization of water to cook the food. Oil based cooking techniques have significant surface interactions that greatly affect the quality of the food they produce. These interactions stem from the polar oil molecules interacting with the surface of the food. Water based techniques have far less surface interactions that affect the quality of the food.

=== Pan fry ===
Pan frying is an oil based cooking technique which is typically used to sear larger cuts of meat or to fully cook thinner cuts. This technique uses a thin layer of heated oil to coat the pan. The oil layer is the method of heat transfer between the burner and the food.

Water vapor is a critical component of how pan frying works. Raw meat products contain up to 73% water. The meat is cooked by the evaporation of this water. When the water is vaporized it leaves the meat through pores in the surface of the meat. Another source of water vapor is the Maillard Reaction. This reaction is responsible for why meat, and many other food products, turn brown when cooked. This reaction only occurs at high temperatures. Water vapor is a byproduct of the Maillard reaction.

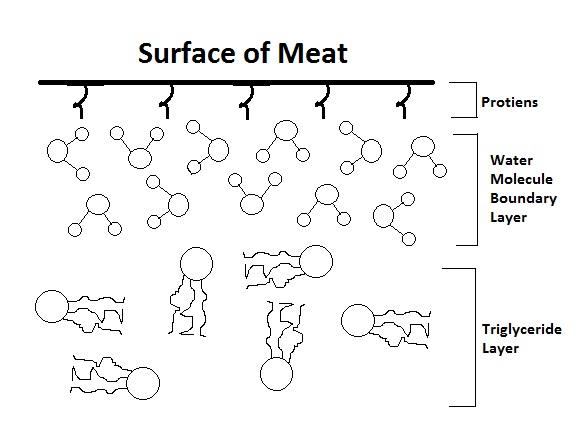
The water molecules create a physical barrier between the proteins on the surface of the meat and the triglyceride molecules in the oil.

In pan frying, the water that exits the meat forms a barrier between the meat and the oil or the surface of the pan. This barrier is critical for the success of pan frying meat. When meat cooks, the proteins on the surface of the meat denature because of the heat. This means that many of the secondary bonds that give the proteins their shape are broken. The protein molecules want to reform those interactions to return to their most thermodynamically stable state. Two opportune locations for the surface proteins to bind are the oil and the surface of the pan. Meat sticking to the bottom of the pan is caused by the interactions between proteins on the surface of the meat binding with the molecules on the surface of the pan. The denatured protein can also bind with the oil in the pan. This is not desirable for many health and flavor reasons. Since the proteins, the oil molecules, and in some cases the surface of the pan, all have a significant polarity, the force of their interactions can be high.

The force of the interactions between the protein and oil or pan surface is modeled by the Coulomb force equation:

${F}=\frac{Q_1Q_2}{4\pi\mathrm{D}^2\varepsilon_0\varepsilon_\mathrm{r}}$

where ${Q}$ represents the charge in coulombs on each object, ${D}$ represents the separation between the two objects in meters, ${\varepsilon_0}$ represents the vacuum permittivity constant which is 8.85... × 10^{−12} farads per meter, and ${\varepsilon_\mathrm{r}}$ represents the relative permittivity of the surrounding material in farads per meter.

The value of each individual interaction may be small but when there are millions of interactions the overall force can be noticeable. The presence of water reduces the force of these attractions in three ways. The water puts physical distance between the oil or pan and the proteins on the surface of the meat. This increases the $D^2$ value in the equation. Water also has a high permittivity value ($\varepsilon_\mathrm{r}$). Both of these increase the value of the denominator and reduce the value of the force that is possible. Water is also a polar molecule which means, in certain cases, it can bind to the denatured proteins. Water binding to the proteins on the surface of the meat has no effect on how the meat cooks.

=== Deep fry ===
Deep frying is another oil based cooking technique that is similar to pan frying. However, in deep frying, the entire piece of food is submerged in the oil. Thus there should be no interaction between the food and the container holding the oil. All the interactions will be between the food and the oil.

Oftentimes the food is covered in a liquid batter before it is deep fried. This eliminates the interactions between the denatured proteins on meat and the oil. In deep frying, the interactions are primarily at the interface of the batter and the oil. For proper deep frying the oil temperature should exceed 163 °C. When the batter, which is typically water based, comes into contact with the high temperature oil, the water in it is instantly vaporized. This vaporization dehydrates the batter and causes the crispiness associated with deep fried foods. Similar to pan frying, the water vapor leaving the batter creates a boundary layer between the oil and the food. Because of the large surface area of the food that is in contact with the oil and the limited water stored in the batter, this boundary layer does not last nearly as long as in pan frying.

The boundary layer of water vapor again serves the purpose of preventing interactions between the oil and the surface of the food. Even as the boundary layer of water breaks down, the initial interactions between the oil and the batter will be minimal. The oil will move into the vacancies left in the batter by the vaporization of the water. At this point there is very little bonding between the fatty acids in the oil and the non polar hydrocarbons that make up the majority of the batter. However the polar portion of the triglyceride molecule does begin to induce dipoles in the hydrocarbon chains that make up the batter.

Under prolonged heat, the triglycerides in the oil begin to break down. This means the glycerol molecules and the fatty acid chains begin to break apart. As this occurs the oil becomes more polar. As the oil becomes more polar, the Van der Waals interactions between the glycerol and the hydrocarbons begin to increase. In this case, the dipole on glycerol induces a dipole in the hydrocarbon chain. The strength of the dipole induced dipole interactions can be modeled with a combination of Debye, Keesom and London interactions through addition.

Debye:

$${V}=\frac{M_1^2\alpha_2 + M_2^2\alpha_1}{-\left(4\pi\varepsilon_0\varepsilon_\mathrm{r}\right)^2r^6}$$

Keesom:

$${V}=\frac{-2\left(M_1M_2\right)^2}{3\left(4\pi\varepsilon_0\varepsilon_\mathrm{r}\right)r^6k_\mathrm{b}T}$$

London:

$${V}=\frac{-3\left(\alpha_1\alpha_2\right)^2}{2\left(4\pi\varepsilon_0\varepsilon_\mathrm{r}\right)^2r^6}\left(\frac{hV_1V_2}{V_1+V_2}\right)$$

Where $M_1$ and $M_2$ are the charges per length in coulomb-meters, $\alpha_1$ and $\alpha_2$ are polarizability in units of C·m^{2}·V^{−1}, ${\varepsilon_0}$ represents the vacuum permittivity constant which is 8.85... × 10^{−12} farads per meter, ${\varepsilon_\mathrm{r}}$ represents the relative permittivity of the surrounding material in farads per meter, $k_\mathrm{b}$ is the Boltzmann constant, $T$ is temperature in units of kelvin, $r$ is the distance between the molecules, and the $hV$ terms refer to the ionization energies of the molecules.

When the water boundary layer is present the value of ε_{r} is very large. The presence of water also increases the value of $r$. Since $r$ is raised to the sixth power any increase is significantly magnified. Both these serve to significantly reduce the interactions between the oil and the batter. As the oil breaks down, its polarizability increases. This significantly increases the strength of the London and Debye interaction and thus combination of them. As the strength of the interactions increases the amount of oil that cannot be removed from the food increases. This leads to greasy, oily and unhealthy food.

=== Water-based cooking techniques ===
There are many cooking techniques that do not use oil as part of the process such as steaming or boiling. Water based techniques are typically used to cook vegetables or other plants which can be consumed as food. When no oil is present the method of heat transfer to the food is typically water vapor. Water vapor molecules do not have any significant surface interactions with the food surface. Since food, including vegetables, is cooked by the vaporization of water within the food, the use of water vapor as the mode of heat transfer has no effect on the chemical interactions on the surface of the food.

== Importance of cooking temperature on interfaces ==
Understanding the role of temperature in cooking is an essential part of creating fine cuisine. Temperature plays a vital role in nearly every meal's preparation. Many aspects of cooking rely on the proper treatment of colloids. Things such as sauces, soups, custards, and butters are all created by either creating or destroying a colloid. Heat plays a vital role in the life of a colloid as the balance between thermal excitation and molecular interaction can tip the scale in favor of suspension or coagulation and eventually coalescence. In some cases, like sauces that contain cheeses, heating the sauce to too high of a temperature will cause clumping, ruining the sauce.

=== Smoke points of oils ===
The smoke point of any oil is defined by the temperature at which light blue smoke rises from the surface. The smoke, which contains acrolein, is an eye irritant and asphixiant. The smoke point of oils vary widely. Depending on origin, refinement, age, and source growth conditions, the smoke point for any given type of oil can drop nearly 20 °C. For example, the smoke point of olive oil can vary from being suitable for high temperature frying to only safely used for stir frying. As a cooking oil is refined its smoke point increases. This is because many of the impurities found in natural oils aid in their breakdown. In general the lighter the oil, the higher its smoke point. It is important to choose the appropriate oil for each cooking technique and temperature as cooking oils degrade rapidly when heated about their smoke point. It is recommended that oils heated beyond their smoke point should not be consumed as the chemicals created are suspected carcinogens.

Cooking Oil	Smoke Point (°C / °F)
Butter	175 / 347
Lard	190 / 374
Sesame	210 / 410
Grape Seed	252 / 486
Palm	232 / 450
Soybean	257 / 495
