= Wonder Pot =

Device for baking on top of a gas stove

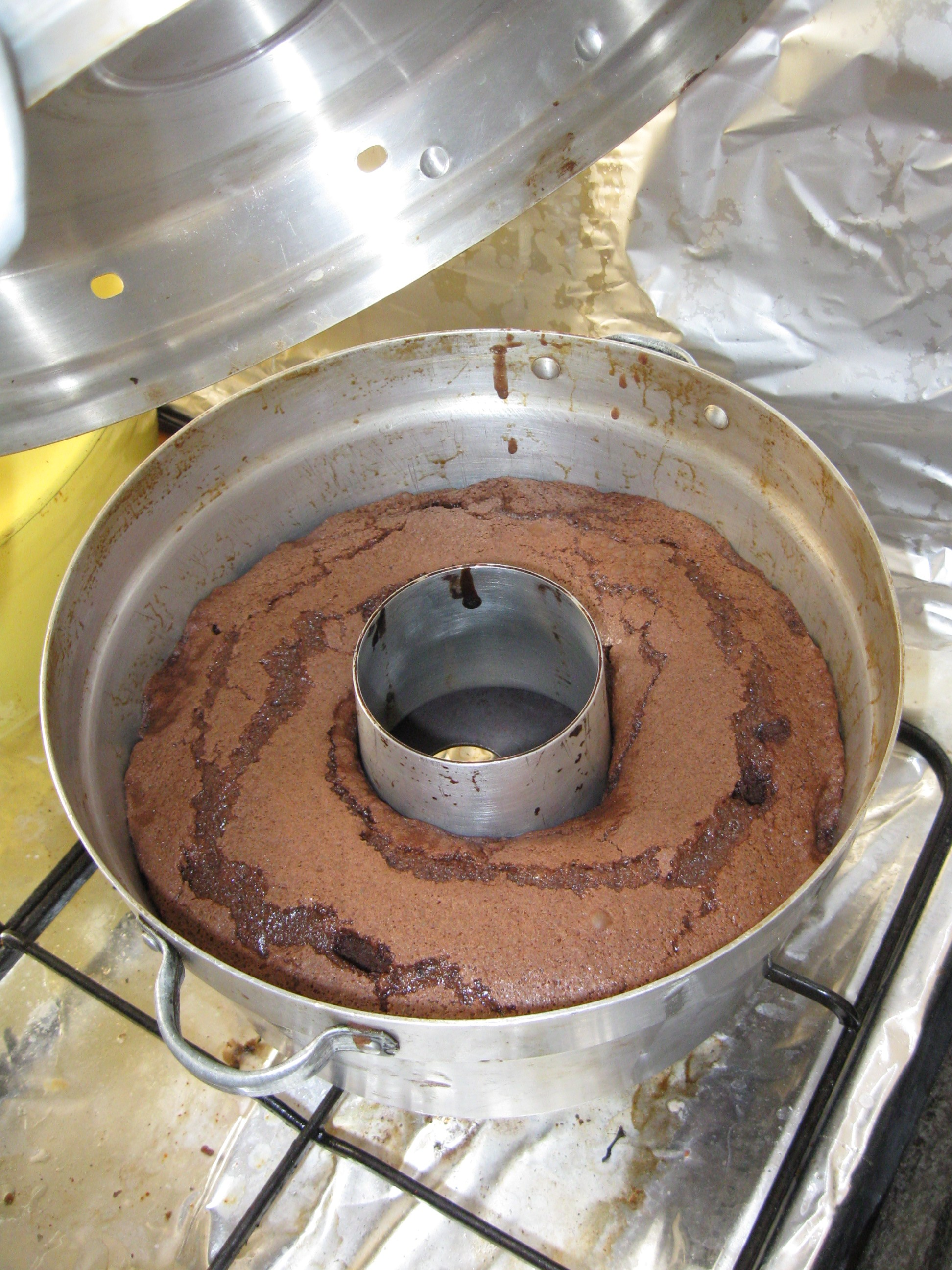
Chocolate cake baked in a Wonder Pot

Wonder Pot (Hebrew: סיר פלא, romanized: sír péle, Hebrew pronunciation: [siʁ ˈpele]) is an Israeli invention for baking on top of a gas stove rather than in an oven. It consists of three parts: an aluminium pot shaped like a Bundt pan except smooth-sided rather than fluted, a hooded cover perforated with venting holes, and a thick, round, slightly domed metal disc with a center hole that is placed between the pot and the flame.

A Wonder Pot can be used to bake cakes, casseroles, rice, potatoes, apples, meat, and chicken.

== History ==
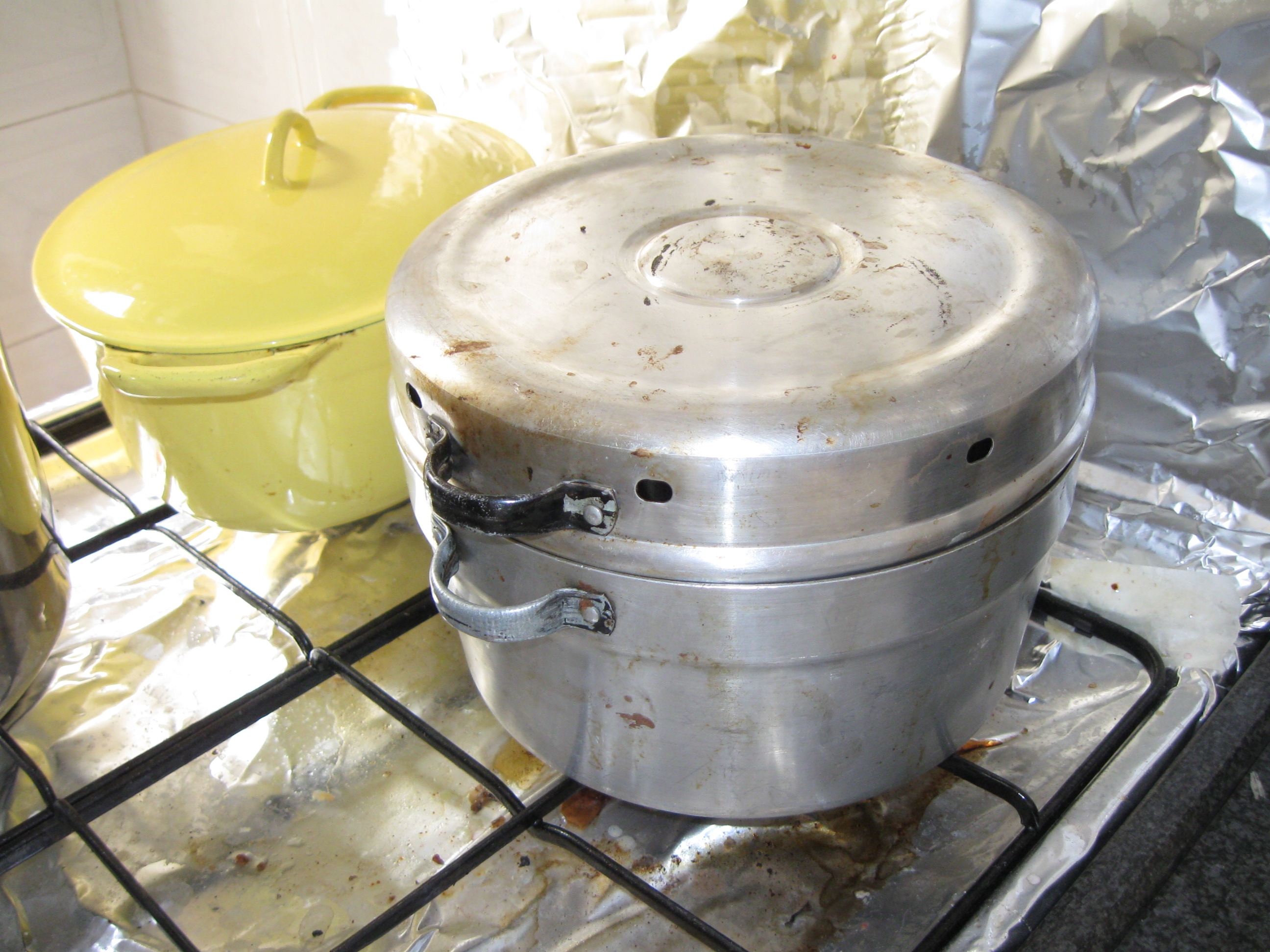
A Wonder Pot (right) on the stove

The Wonder Pot gained popularity during Israel's era of national austerity in the 1950s, when most citizens did not own an oven. The concept was based on models from Germany and Eastern Europe, and was first manufactured by the Palalum company (the company name was a contraction of the words pele (wonder) and aluminium). Later the Wonder Pot was manufactured by other companies in the Haredi sector, including the Matlum company, which continues to produce the item today.

The Wonder Pot retained its popularity through the 1970s, especially among new immigrants who did not have ovens. During its heyday, the Wonder Pot spawned its own bestselling cookbook. The introduction of the microwave oven and a national desire to dissociate with the austerity mentality put an end to its widespread use. However, the Wonder Pot is still used by Israeli Haredi families for baking kugels, and it is also popular in this sector on the holiday of Passover for those who do not have a kosher-for-Passover oven.

Today the Wonder Pot is considered a nostalgic Israeli kitchen item. It is still sold in traditional housewares stores, via marketing outlets, and in Haredi communities such as Bnei Brak and Jerusalem. In the late 2000s decade, a housewares store calling itself Seer Peh-leh ("Wonder Pot") opened in the Talpiot neighborhood of Jerusalem.

== How it works ==
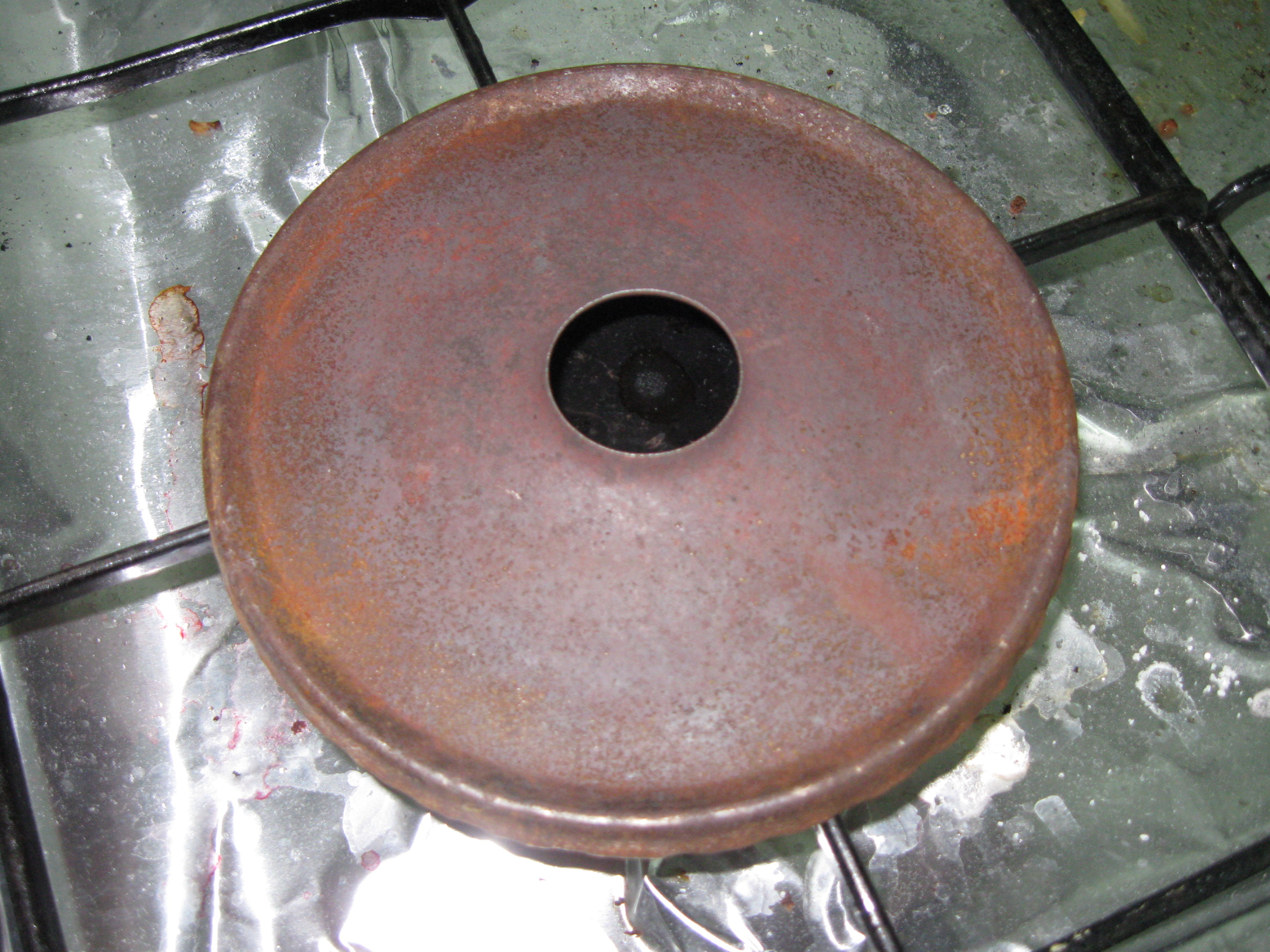
Metal disc placed between the Wonder Pot and the flame

The Wonder Pot is effective at baking on top of the stove for three reasons: its aluminium material, its hole, and the metal disc separating it from the flame. The aluminium material allows heat to spread uniformly. The center hole of the pot focuses the flame and creates heat dispersion around the inside of the cake. The metal disc lifts the pot off the fire, reducing and focusing the flame. Baking in the Wonder Pot without the metal disc will produce a cake that is dry on the bottom and thick and wobbly in the center. The metal disc is sold in different thicknesses and diameters to accommodate different baking times and larger flames. The lid of the Wonder Pot is perforated with small holes to release steam. Baking time in a Wonder Pot varies from 40 to 50 minutes.

The Wonder Pot produces high and airy cakes. In addition to baking, the Wonder Pot is an effective medium for cooking vegetables, legumes, and rice in layers. It can also be used to cook kugels, casseroles, pasta dishes, meat, and chicken.

== See also ==
- Israeli inventions and discoveries
- Israeli cuisine
- List of cooking vessels
