= Cast-iron cookware =

Cookware valued for heat retention properties

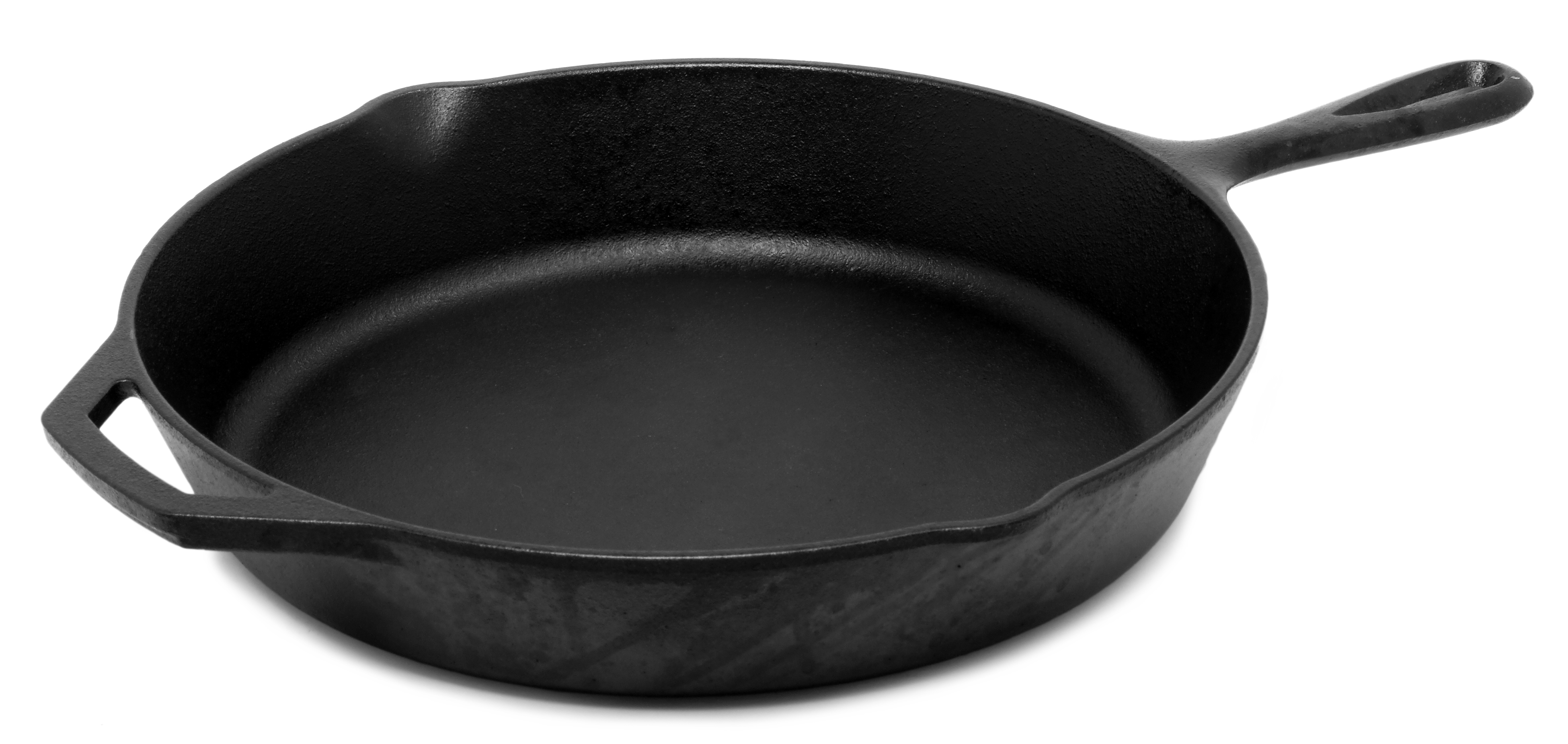
A cast-iron skillet

Heavy-duty cookware made of cast iron is valued for its heat retention, durability, ability to maintain high temperatures for long durations, and non-stick cooking when properly seasoned. Seasoning is also used to protect bare cast iron from rust. Types of cast-iron cookware include frying pans, dutch ovens, griddles, waffle irons, flattop grills, panini presses, crêpe makers, deep fryers, tetsubin, woks, potjies, and karahi.

== History ==
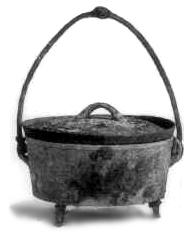
An American cast-iron Dutch oven, 1896

In Asia, particularly China, India, Korea and Japan, there is a long history of cooking with cast-iron vessels. The first mention of a cast-iron kettle in English appeared in 679 or 680, though this wasn't the first use of metal vessels for cooking. The term pot came into use in 1180. Both terms referred to a vessel capable of withstanding the direct heat of a fire. Cast-iron cauldrons and cooking pots were valued as kitchen items for their durability and their ability to retain heat evenly, thus improving the quality of cooked meals.

In Europe and the United States, before the introduction of the kitchen stove in the middle of the 19th century, meals were cooked in the hearth, and cooking pots and pans were either designed for use in the hearth, or to be suspended within it. Cast-iron pots were made with handles to allow them to be hung over a fire, or with legs so that they could stand in the coals. In addition to Dutch ovens with three or four feet, which Abraham Darby I secured a patent in 1708 to produce, a commonly used cast-iron cooking pan called a spider had a handle and three legs allowing it to stand upright over campfires as well as in the coals and ashes of a fireplace.

Cooking pots and pans with legless, flat bottoms came into use when cooking stoves became popular; this period of the late 19th century saw the introduction of the flat cast-iron skillet.

Cast-iron cookware was especially popular among homemakers during the first half of the 20th century. It was a cheap, yet durable cookware. Most American households had at least one cast-iron cooking pan. Popular manufacturers included Griswold, which began production in 1865, Wagner in 1891, and Blacklock Foundry in 1896. The 20th century also saw the introduction and popularization of enamel-coated cast-iron cookware.

Cast iron fell out of favor in the 1960s and 1970s, as teflon-coated aluminum non-stick cookware was introduced and quickly became the item of choice in many kitchens. The decline in daily use of cast-iron cookware contributed to the closure of nearly all the iron cookware manufacturers in the United States. Many went out of business in the 1920s and others were absorbed by other cookware manufacturers.

A large selection of cookware can be purchased from kitchen suppliers. The durability and reliability of cast iron as a cooking tool has ensured its survival. Cast-iron pots and pans from the 19th and 20th century continue to see daily use to the present day. They are also highly sought after by antique collectors and dealers. Cast iron has also seen a resurgence of its popularity in specialty markets. Through cooking shows, celebrity chefs have brought renewed attention to traditional cooking methods, especially the use of cast iron. In the 2010s, small startup companies began producing cast-iron cookware designs for specialty cooking markets.

== Surface ==
=== Bare cast iron ===
Cast iron's ability to withstand and maintain very high cooking temperatures makes it a common choice for searing or frying, and its excellent heat retention makes it a good option for long-cooking stews or braised dishes. Because cast-iron skillets can develop a "non-stick" surface when cared for properly, they are excellent for frying potatoes or preparing stir-fries. Some cooks consider cast iron a good choice for egg dishes, while others feel the iron adds an off-flavor to eggs. Other uses of cast-iron pans include baking, for instance for making cornbread, cobblers and cakes.

Most bare cast-iron pots and pans are cast as a single piece of metal, including the handle. This allows them to be used on both the stovetop and in the oven. Many recipes call for the use of a cast-iron skillet or pot, especially so that the dish can be initially seared or fried on the stovetop then transferred into the oven, pan and all, to finish baking. Likewise, cast-iron skillets can double as baking dishes. This differs from many other cooking pots, which have varying components that may be damaged by the excessive temperatures of 400 °F (200 °C) or more.

Cast iron is a poor heat conductor compared to copper and aluminum, and this can result in uneven heating if a cast-iron pan is heated too quickly or on an undersized burner. Cast iron has a higher heat capacity than copper but a lower heat capacity than stainless steel or aluminum. However, cast iron is denser than aluminum and stores more heat per unit volume. Additionally, cast-iron pans are typically thicker than similar sized pans of other materials. The combination of these factors results in cast-iron pans being capable of storing more heat longer than copper, aluminum, or stainless steel pans. Slow heating over an appropriate sized burner (or in an oven) can lead to a more even temperature distribution. Due to the thermal mass of cast-iron utensils, especially heavy duty pots and pans, they can retain heat for a long time, and continue cooking food after the heat source has been removed.

=== Enameled cast iron ===
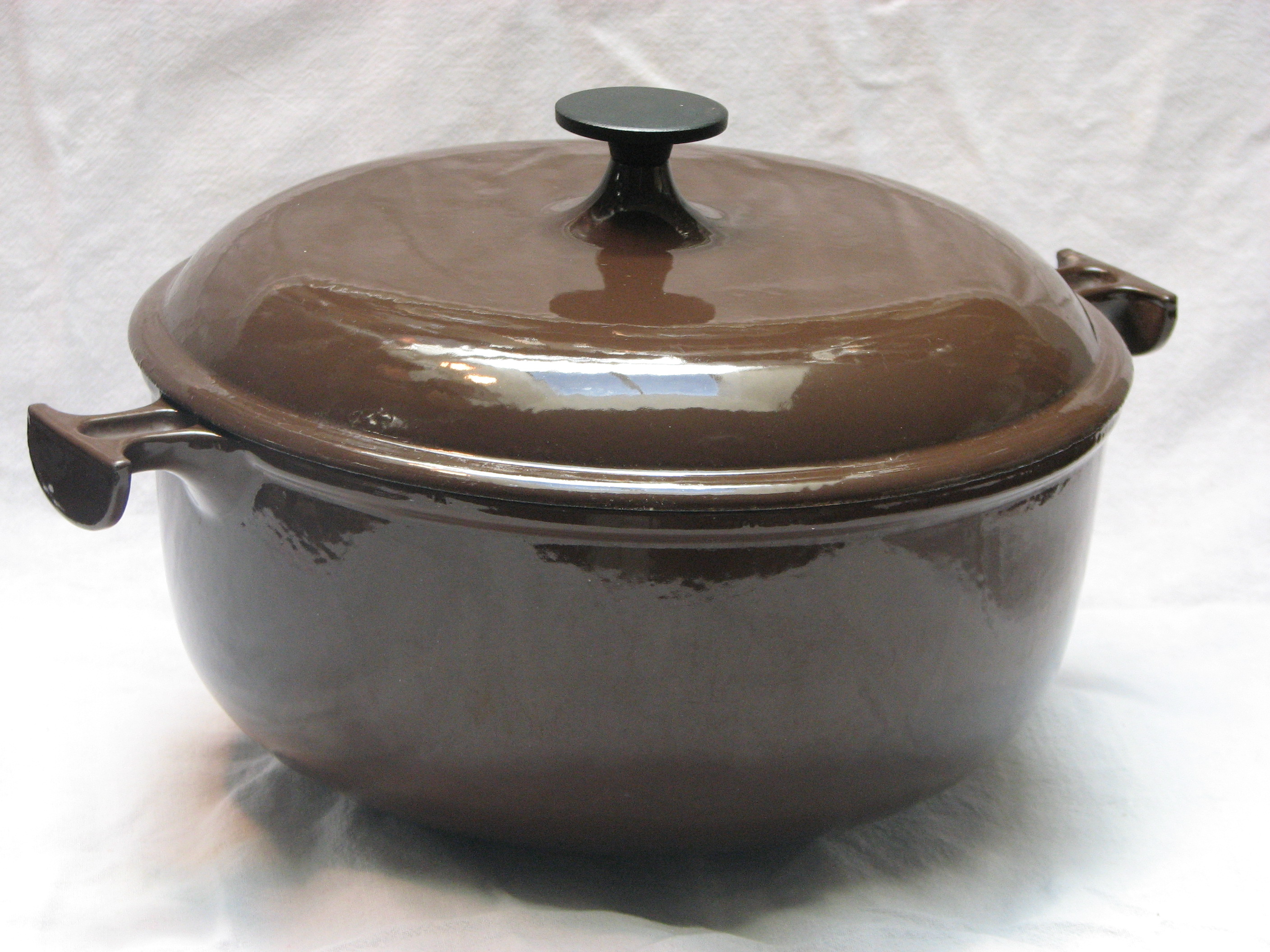
An enameled cast-iron pot

Enameled cast iron is cast iron that has a vitreous enamel glaze applied to the surface. The fusion of the glaze with the cast iron prevents rusting, eliminates the need to season the metal, and allows more thorough cleaning. Enameled cast iron is excellent for slow cooking and drawing flavor from foods. Furthermore, cadmium pigments used in the enameling process are resistant to temperatures of 1,700 to 2,300 °F (900 to 1,280 °C) and can produce vibrant colors.

While enamel-coated cast iron does not have the seasoning and cleaning issues of bare cast iron, a similar style of enamel-coated cast iron can cost three or four times its bare cast-iron counterpart. For those seeking to reduce iron in their diet, enameled cast iron limits the leaching of dietary iron into food. However, some of the benefits of bare cast iron, such as the ability to withstand searing heat and resist sticking, are lost through enameling. In addition, the enamel coating can become chipped if the pan is dropped, overheated, or cold water is added to a hot pot.

Toxic heavy metals such as cadmium and lead can be leached from the enamel coating into food being cooked in some cast iron pots.

Some popular brands of enameled cookware include Le Creuset, Staub, Descoware, Cousances, and Druware.

=== Seasoning ===
A seasoned pan has a stick-resistant coating created by polymerized oils and fats. Seasoning is a process by which a layer of animal fat or vegetable oil is applied and cooked onto cast-iron or carbon steel cookware. A proper cast iron seasoning protects the cookware from rusting, provides a non-stick surface for cooking, and reduces food interaction with the iron of the pan. Enamel-coated cast-iron pans are not subject to rusting, but do not build up a seasoning and need a sufficient amount of fat when cooking.

Washing a seasoned pan in a conventional dishwasher will remove the seasoned coating. While some food writers advise against all use of detergent for seasoned pans, tests by America's Test Kitchen found that small amounts of soap do not damage the seasoning. Exposure to acidic foods, such as tomatoes, damages the seasoning and the cookware may need to be re-seasoned over time. Though some writers recommend completely avoiding cooking acidic foods in seasoned pans, America's Test Kitchen found that cooking acidic foods for short periods of time had no noticeable effect.

== Cleaning ==
Because other cookware cleaning techniques like scouring or washing in a dishwasher can remove or damage the seasoning on a bare cast-iron pan, experts advise not cleaning these pans like most other cookware. Some chefs advocate simply wiping them out after use, or washing them with hot water and a stiff brush. Others advocate washing with mild soap and water, and then re-applying a thin layer of fat or oil. It is a common misconception that cleaning a well-seasoned cast-iron pan with mild soap will remove or damage the seasoning. A third approach is to scrub with coarse salt and a paper towel or clean rag.

== Health effects ==
An American Dietetic Association study found that cast-iron cookware can leach significant amounts of dietary iron into food. The amounts of iron absorbed varied greatly depending on the food, its acidity, its water content, how long it was cooked, and how old the cookware is. The iron in spaghetti sauce increased 845 percent (from 0.61 mg/100 g to 5.77 mg/100 g), while for other foods it increased less dramatically; for example, the iron in cornbread increased 28 percent, from 0.67 to 0.86 mg/100 g. People with anemia or other iron deficiencies may benefit from this effect, which was the basis for the development of the lucky iron fish, a small iron ingot used during cooking to provide dietary iron to those with iron deficiency. People with hemochromatosis (iron overload, bronze disease) should avoid using cast-iron cookware because of the iron leaching effect into the food.

Laboratory tests conducted by America's Test Kitchen found that an unseasoned cast-iron skillet leached significant iron into tomato sauce (10.8 mg/100 g), while a seasoned cast-iron pan leached only a small amount.

== See also ==
- Chugun, Russian cast-iron crock
- Cookware and bakeware
- List of cast-iron cookware manufacturers
- List of cooking vessels
- Non-stick surface
- Non-stick pan
