= List of American cast-iron cookware manufacturers =

Manufacturers of Cast-Iron Cookware, US

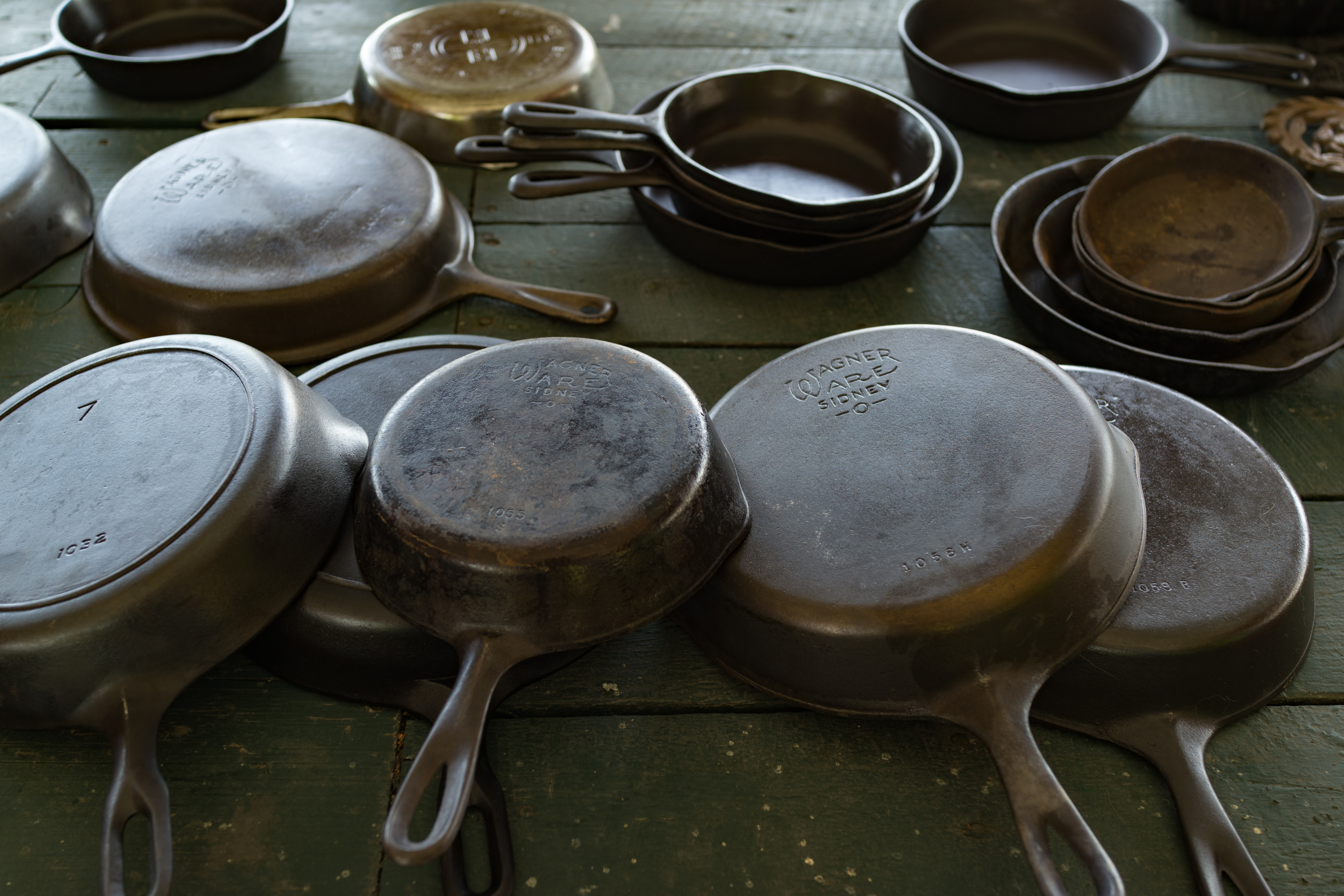
A collection of vintage cast iron cookware

Most of the major manufacturers of cast iron cookware in the United States began production in the late 1800s or early 1900s. Cast-iron cookware and stoves were especially popular among homemakers and housekeepers during the first half of the 20th century. Most American households had at least one cast-iron stove and cooking pan, and such brands as Griswold and Wagner Ware were especially popular; though several other manufacturers also produced kitchen utensils and cooking pots and pans at that time.

With the exception of Lodge Manufacturing, most American manufacturers of cast iron from this era, such as Atlanta Stove Works, have been acquired by other corporations and no longer produce cast-iron cookware in the United States; however, cast iron pots and pans from the early 20th century continue to see daily use among many households in the present day. They are also highly sought after by antique collectors and dealers. Among the rarest products were those produced in 1920. Exporting and trade flourished creating a shortage for U.S. consumers. Exporting overseas created an increase in industry output for the following years. Manufacturing and industry contributed to the prosperity and growth of an era that would be known as the "Roaring 20's" marking a post-war national lifestyle change.

== Griswold ==
Founded in 1865 as the Seldon and Griswold Manufacturing Company, the Griswold company became known as the premier manufacturer of high-quality cast-iron kitchen items in the United States. The Griswold cast iron foundry was based in Erie, Pennsylvania; and until the early 1900s, cast-iron items from this company were marked with an "ERIE" logo. In the early 1900s, this was changed to a "GRISWOLD" logo, and it is this logo that is most commonly associated with Griswold cast-iron cookware.

Griswold was acquired by the Randall Company in 1957, who had also acquired Griswold's rival Wagner in 1952. Randall sold both Wagner and Griswold to the General Housewares Corporation in 1969, and they produced both brands until 1996.

== Vollrath ==
The Vollrath Company was founded in 1874 in Sheboygan, Wisconsin, by Jacob J. Vollrath. The company manufactured porcelain enameled pots, pans, plates, cups and other kitchenware by coating cast iron with ceramic glaze, and Vollrath received a patent on "speckled" enameled glaze for household utensils in 1889. By the 1920s the Vollrath Company was producing a catalog of more than 800 products. It was affected by the Great Depression, and during World War II the company had moved exclusively into defense manufacturing and thus, production of cast-iron products for household use ceased during this era. Vollrath produced a Polio-Pak during the polio epidemic. It was among the first manufacturing companies in America to integrate computer technology.

== Wagner ==
Founded in 1891 by brothers Milton M. and Bernard P. of Sidney, Ohio, as the Wagner Manufacturing Company. The Wagner family produced cookware at their cast iron foundry until 1952, when they sold their business to the Randall Company. Subsequent owners continued to operate the Sidney plant until it closed in 1999. The foundry was demolished in 2023.

In 2000, both the Griswold and Wagner brands were acquired by the American Culinary Corporation of Willoughby, Ohio. In 2022, the brand was reintroduced to the market by the newly established Wagner Cast Iron. The company manufactures reissues of historic Wagner cookware products.

== Favorite ==
In 1887, the Favorite Stove & Range Company moved to Piqua, Ohio, from Cincinnati, Ohio. The firm became Piqua's largest manufacturer. The company focused primarily on the manufacture of stoves and stove parts throughout its history, though it also produced several lines of mid-priced cast-iron pans from the 1910s through the 1930s. The death of owner Stanhope Boal in 1933 and the devastation of the Great Depression led to the company's liquidation in 1935.

== Atlanta Stove Works ==
The Atlanta Stove Works company was founded in 1889 (originally named Georgia Stove Company) to produce cast-iron stoves. Initially, their business boomed to the point where in 1902, a separate foundry was built in Birmingham, Alabama, especially for the production of hollow ware and cast-iron cookware to supplement their stoves. This separate foundry was named "Birmingham Stove & Range". From the early 1900s through the 1970s, Birmingham Stove & Range foundry produced a line of cast-iron pans that are described as "unmarked" as they had no manufacturer logo or other identifying mark. These "unmarked" cast-iron skillets and pans from Birmingham Stove & Range are widely available and used on a daily basis, even in the present day. Birmingham Stove & Range filed for bankruptcy in 1989, and their holdings were acquired by Lodge Manufacturing.

== Lodge ==
Founded in 1896 by Joseph Lodge, Lodge Manufacturing is one of America's oldest cookware companies in continuous operation. It is still owned by the descendants of the Lodge family. Mike Otterman was named president and CEO of Lodge Cast Iron in 2019. He is the first non-family member to run the company. Most cast iron sold by Lodge is produced in its foundry in South Pittsburg, Tennessee, which has been in operation since the company was founded.

== Wapak ==
Founded in 1903, the Wapak Hollow Ware company was named after its hometown of Wapakoneta, Ohio, where it produced several lines of "thin wall" (lightweight manufacture) cast-iron skillets. Information about this company is scarce but bankruptcy in 1926 is the reason listed in the Auglaize County records for Wapak's disappearance.

The company utilized several different logos on its wares while in business. One of the company's more famous logos is the "Indian Head" logo which reads: "WAPAK HIGH GRADE HOLLOW WARE". The words are placed inside a circle with a bust of an American Indian chief in full headgear. Pieces bearing this "Indian logo" are the most prized by collectors of Wapak Hollow Ware today.

== Borough Furnace ==
Founded in 2011, Borough Furnace is based in Syracuse, NY. All of their products are designed by John Truex. Borough Furnace seasons their products with flax seed oil and advertises their usage of recycled materials.

== Stargazer Cast Iron ==
Founded in 2015, Stargazer Cast Iron is based in Allentown, PA. They design and manufacture cast iron cookware and accessories entirely in the United States. Stargazer advertises a smooth finish and modern design.

== The Field Company ==
Founded in 2015, manufactures and sells smoother, lighter cast-iron skillets. Made in America.

== FINEX Cast Iron Cookware Company ==
Founded in 2012, FINEX is based in Portland, Oregon, and manufactures cast-iron cookware in the US. The company was founded by a local technology entrepreneur, Dr. Ron Khormaei, and a long-time cast iron enthusiast, Mike Whitehead. The company introduced several new concepts through a successful KickStarter Campaign in 2013. In August 2019, Lodge announced acquisition of FINEX. The brand continues with its HQ in Portland and offers a wide selection of skillets, grills, and Dutch Ovens.

== Smithey Ironware Company ==
Founded in 2015, the Smithey Ironware Company manufactures cast-iron skillets (10-inch and 12-inch) in Charleston, South Carolina.

== Butter Pat Industries ==
Founded in 2013, Butter Pat Industries manufactures smooth cast-iron skillets, without machining, milling or grinding in Easton, Maryland. The company is currently in the middle of being acquired by YETI as of 2023.

== Challenger Breadware ==
Founded in 2016, Challenger Breadware's upside-down Dutch ovens are manufactured in Wisconsin and are designed for baking bread in a home oven.

== Lancaster Cast Iron ==
Founded in 2018, Lancaster Cast Iron is an American cookware manufacturer based in Lancaster County, Pennsylvania. The company was founded by Mark Longenecker and Brandon Moore, and released its first products in 2019.

The company produces cast iron cookware and wooden kitchen utensils in the United States. Its products are described as lightweight, smooth-finished cast iron cookware inspired by vintage American designs.

== Modern-day importers ==
Several companies import cast-iron cookware of Chinese manufacture and market these products in America. Known American marketers of Chinese cast-iron cooking equipment include Bayou Classic, Camp Chef, Coleman, Lodge enameled pans, Old Mountain, The Windmill Cast Iron and Texsport. There is also a cast-iron manufacturer in Colombia named Victoria Cookware. Originally producing metal toys and decorative items, the company transitioned into the production of cast iron skillets, griddles, Dutch ovens, tortilla presses, and various cast iron accessories with a broad distribution in the US.

== See also ==
- List of cooking vessels
