= Zwilling J. A. Henckels =

German knife-maker

Zwilling J. A. Henckels AG
- Type: Subsidiary (AG)
- Industry: Kitchenware
- Founded: Solingen, North Rhine-Westphalia; 13 June 1731; 295 years ago
- Founder: Peter Henckels
- Headquarters: Solingen, North Rhine-Westphalia
- Area served: Worldwide
- Products: Kitchen knives, cutlery, cookware
- Revenue: €830 million (2024)
- Parent: Werhahn KG
- Subsidiaries: Staub, Demeyere, Miyabi, Ballarini, Henckels Intl.
- Website: www.zwilling.com

Zwilling J. A. Henckels AG is a German knife-maker based in Solingen, North Rhine-Westphalia. It is one of the largest and oldest manufacturers of kitchen knives for domestic and professional use, having been founded in June 1731 by Peter Henckels. It is also one of the oldest operating companies in the world. The brand's namesake was Johann Abraham Henckels (1771–1850), who renamed the brand after himself under his leadership. J. A. Henckels is one of the leading manufacturers of chef's knives. Since 1970, Zwilling has been fully owned by Werhahn KG. The following brands belong to the Zwilling Group: Zwilling, Henckels, Miyabi, BSF, Demeyere, Staub, Fontignac, Ballarini, Flammkraft, and Santos Grills.

== Early history and expansion ==
J. A. Henckels International logo

"Zwilling" (German for 'twin') was founded on 13 June 1731 by the German knife-maker Peter Henckels. The logo was registered with the Cutlers' Guild of Solingen, making Zwilling one of the earliest examples of a trademarked company. In 1771, Peter's son Johann Abraham Henckels (1771–1850)—the later namesake of the company—was born. The Henckels logo has been in the current shape with a red background since 1969.

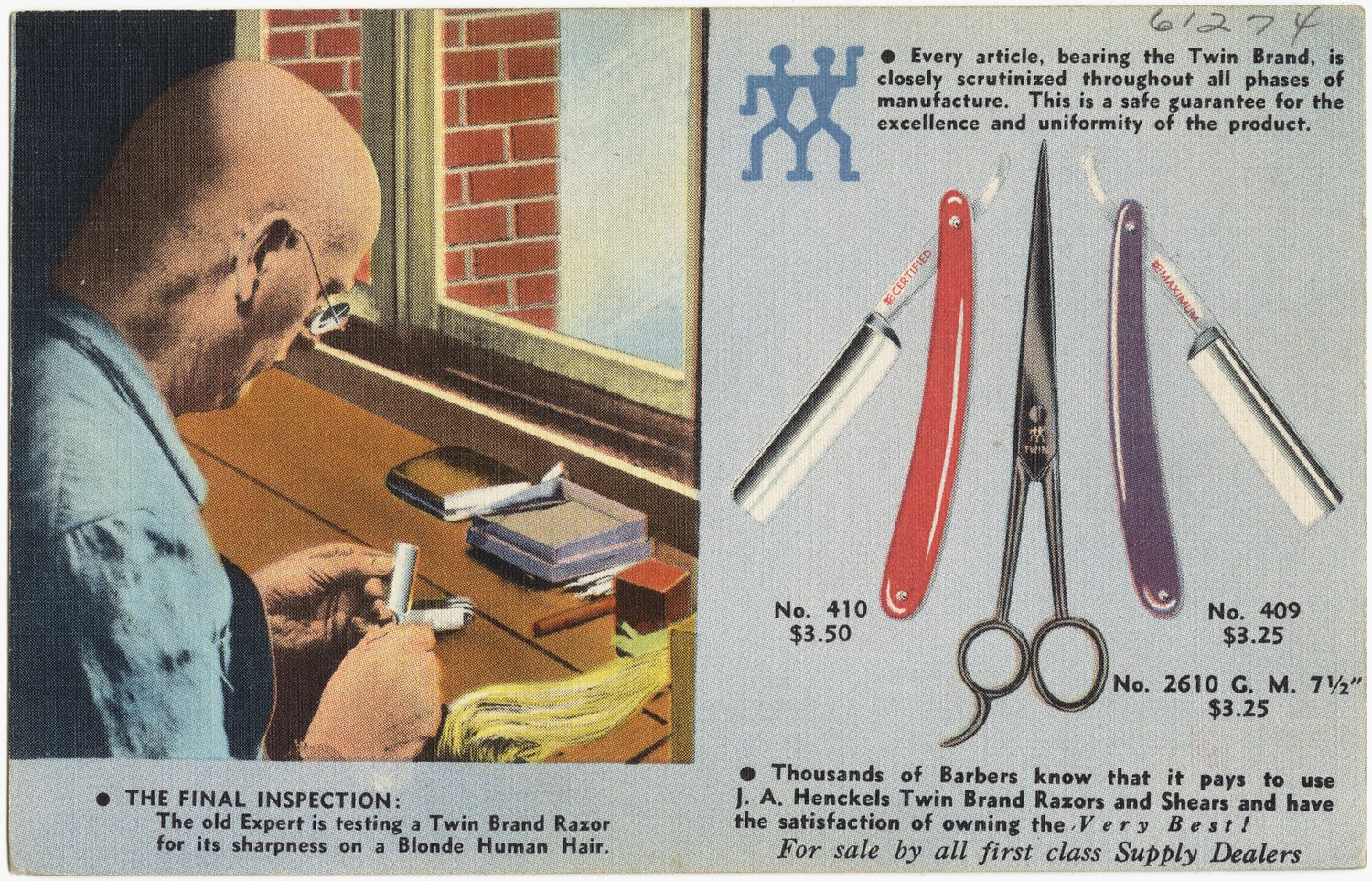
J. A. Henckels Twin Brand Razors and Shears promotional postcard, around 1930–1945

J. A. Henckels opened the first trading outlet in 1818 in Berlin, opening a shop in New York City in 1883 and followed a year later by Vienna. The company exhibited its products at the 1851 Great Exhibition at the Crystal Palace in Great Britain, being awarded an international knifesmithing medal.

J. A. Henckels was awarded the Grand Prix prize in Paris in 1900 and the Grand Prix of St. Louis in 1904. It was also awarded the Prussian State Golden Medal. Henckels was also given a royal warrant of appointment as purveyors of knives to the Imperial and Royal Court of Austria-Hungary (see K.u.k. Hoflieferant (in German)).

Since 1970, Zwilling has been fully owned by Werhahn KG located in Neuss.

== Brands & current state ==
The company operates several brands, including Zwilling J. A. Henckels, J. A. Henckels International, Miyabi (former Nippa), Staub, Demeyere, Ballarini and BSF. Through these activities, the company also operates its own retail shops both in Germany and internationally, among them about 200 sub-stores in China. Since 1970, the Werhahn Group has owned the company, with a staff of 3,200 worldwide. Profits amounted to €282 million in 2007, with 80% generated outside Germany. In 2004, Henckels acquired the Japanese knife manufacturer Nippa and the U.S. beauty specialist Tweezerman, which is operated independently from Zwilling.

=== Hairdressing ===
Since 1988, J. A. Henckels has partnered with Solingen-based professional hairdressing equipment manufacturer Jaguar, which became part of the Zwilling group in 2004 to make product for the hairdressing industry, also owning a selection of hairdressing equipment brands.

=== Cookware ===
With the 2008 acquisitions of the Belgian manufacturer Demeyere (stainless steel cookware) and the French group Staub, which produces enameled cast iron cookware, Zwilling moved to expand the cookware segment of its business.

== Knife lines ==
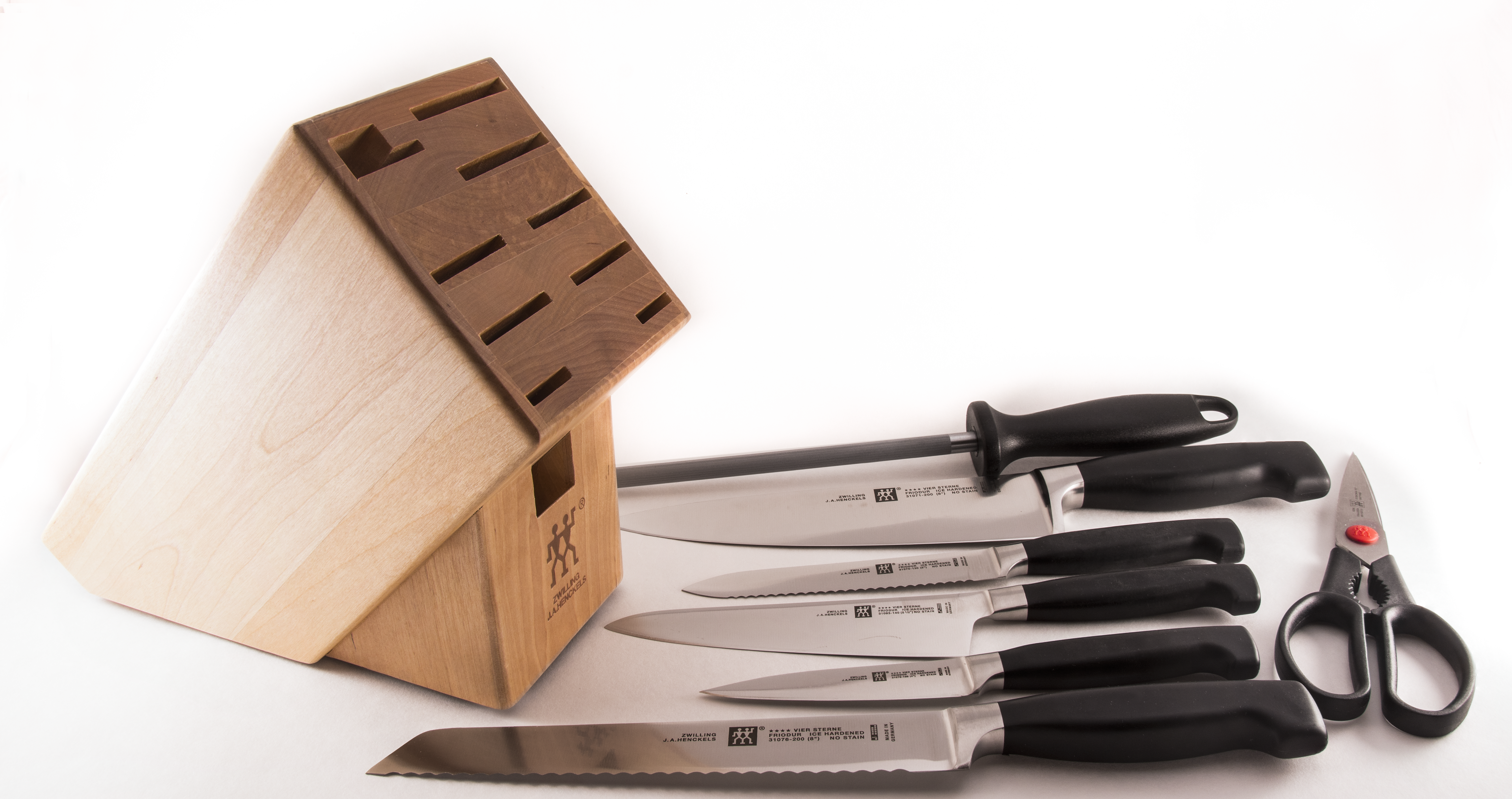
Zwilling J. A. Henckels Four Star knife set

In 1976, Henckels introduced the Four Star line, which is a fully forged knife with a molded handle made of polypropylene and a tang extending into the handle. The majority of Zwilling knives have blades constructed from high-carbon stainless steel, which is ice-hardened for sharpness and stain resistance, along with a partnership allowing some products constructed using a microcarbide powder steel with clad layers, which are manufactured in Japan. In 2011, Zwilling partnered with Master Bladesmith and designer Bob Kramer to launch a series of co-branded knives, starting with a carbon steel line.

== Manufacturing process ==
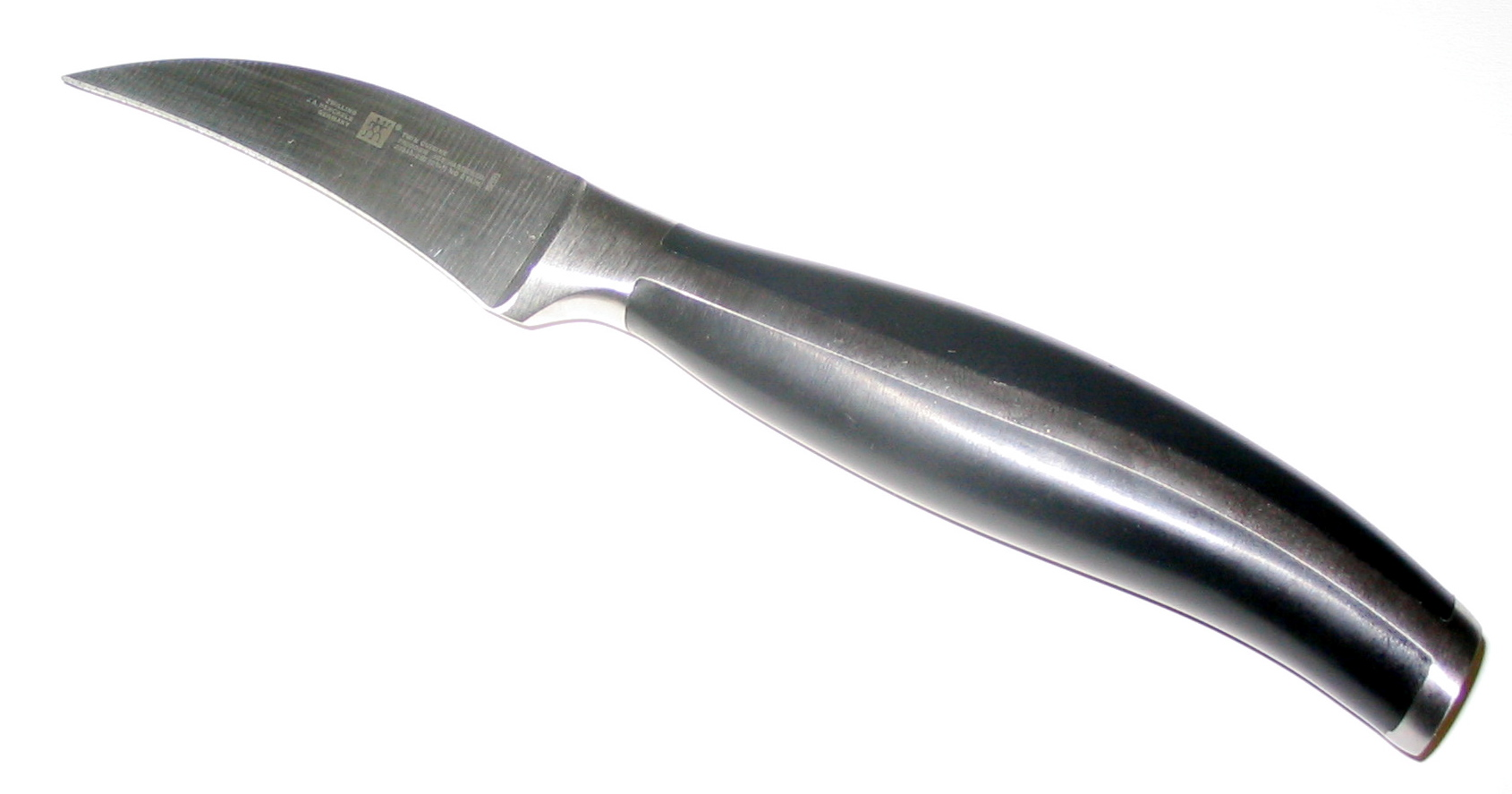
TWIN Cuisine Tournant knife

Henckels knives are manufactured in several ways. A large selection of knives in the range is forged from a single piece of high-carbon stainless steel, which is cold-hardened to improve stain resistance. This hardening process consists of cryogenic tempering and involves immersing the finished knife blades in liquid nitrogen. This process is required to get full hardness from most stainless knife steels, as it completes the conversion of austenite to martensite. The process of forging is intended to produce improved cutting-edge retention, weight, balance, and reduced opportunity for metal fatigue. Most of Zwilling's higher-end knives are manufactured in Solingen, North Rhine-Westphalia, while others, including Henckels-branded knives, are made in Spain and China.

== Modern expansion ==
In 1883, Graef & Schmidt opened a Zwilling/J.A. Henckels branch in New York. In 1909 Henckels set up its first subsidiary in the U.S., followed by Canada, the Netherlands, Denmark, Switzerland, Japan, Italy, France, Spain and China. In 2008, subsidiaries were set up in Great Britain and Brazil.

== In popular culture ==
A Henckels shop front can be seen in a whole scene in Fritz Lang's 1931 film M (approximately 51 minutes into the movie). In 2010 Jeffrey Elliot and Michael DeWan wrote The Zwilling J.A. Henckels Complete Guide to Knife Skills: The Essential Guide to Use, Techniques and Care, which is available in English, Dutch and French.
