= Cousances =

French enameled cast-iron cookware

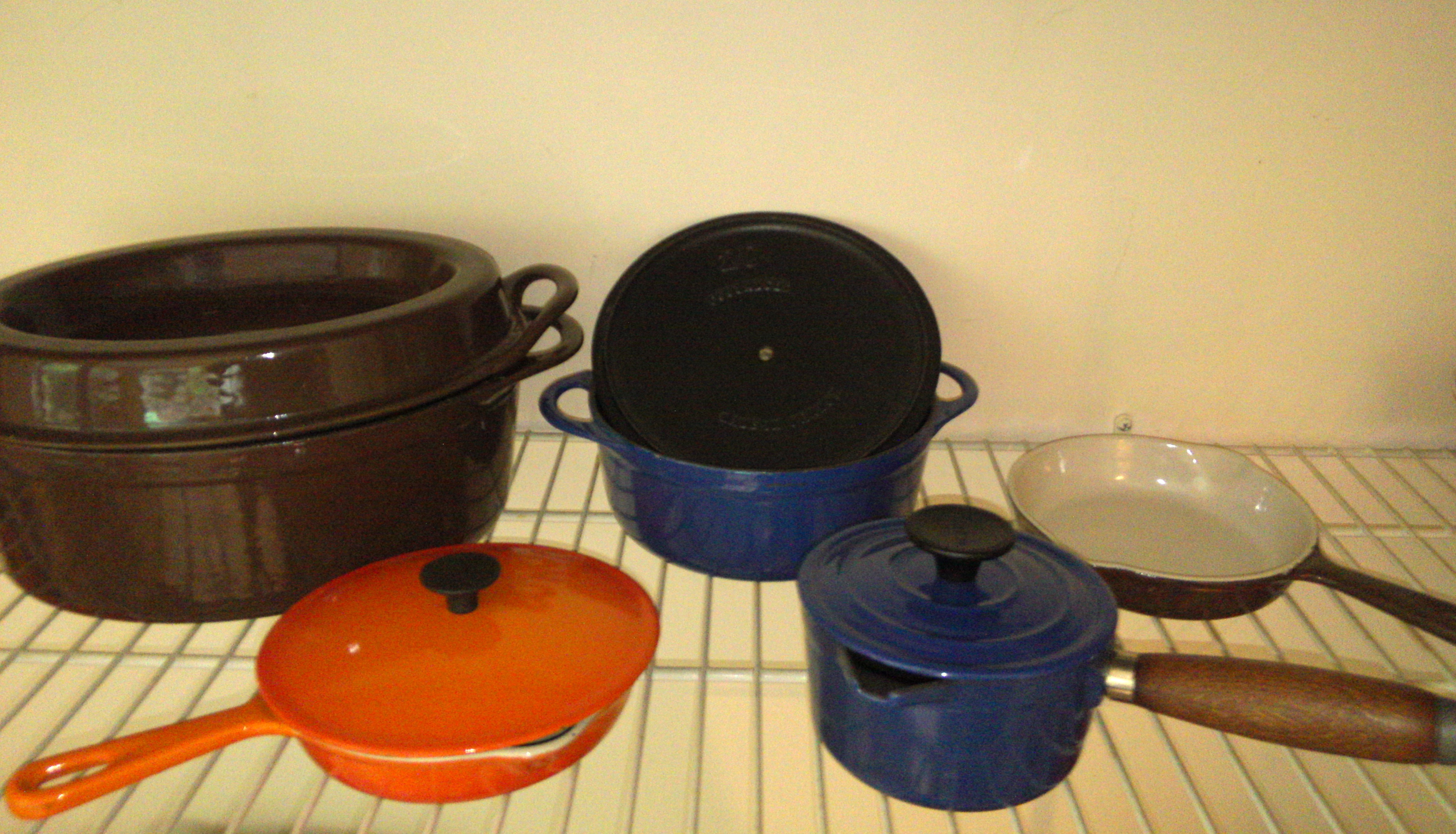
- Cousances enameled cast iron cookware. From left, the Doufeu (a slow-cooking pot roaster), small skillet, small round terrine, lipped milkpan with lid, skillet.
- Industry: Cookware
- Founded: 1553; 473 years ago
- Founder: Haut-fourneau Et Fonderies De Cousances
- Defunct: 1957
- Successor: Le Creuset
- Headquarters: Cousances-les-Forges, France
- Owner: Haut-fourneau Et Fonderies De Cousances

Cousances was a brand of enameled cast iron cookware (French: cocotte). originally manufactured by a foundry in the town of Cousances-les-Forges in northeastern France. The Cousances foundry began making cast iron pans in 1553. Four centuries later, in 1957, the brand was acquired by Le Creuset. Cookware under the Cousances brand continued to be manufactured by Le Creuset into the early 1980s.

A conspicuous Cousances design was a dutch oven called the Doufeu (lit. 'gentle fire') in which the sunken or recessed lid was kept at a reduced temperature by placing ice cubes on top and allowing the steam inside to condense. As the inside of the lid was dotted with smooth protrusions or notches, the condensed droplets sprinkled back evenly on the cooking food to baste it.

The Cousances foundry also made cast-iron firebacks, with one example of a design with stamp, "DECOUSANCES" dating to 1690.

== See also ==
- Descoware
- Druware
- Le Creuset
