= Lodge (company) =

American manufacturer of cast-iron cookware

Lodge Manufacturing Company
- Type: Private
- Industry: Cookware
- Founded: 1896
- Founder: Joseph Lodge
- Headquarters: South Pittsburg, Tennessee, United States
- Key people: Mike Otterman, CEO
- Website: www.lodgecastiron.com

Lodge Manufacturing Company is an American manufacturer of cast-iron cookware based in South Pittsburg, Tennessee. Founded in 1896 by Joseph Lodge, Lodge Manufacturing is one of America's oldest cookware companies in continuous operation. It is still owned and managed by the descendants of the Lodge family. Most cast iron sold by Lodge is produced in its foundry in South Pittsburg, which has been in operation since the company was founded.

== History ==
Joseph Lodge traveled the US before going to work on the railroads in Cuba, before returning to Tennessee. Joseph built the Lodge Family home in 1877 and then opened their first foundry in 1896 named the Blacklock Foundry.

In 1910, the Blacklock Foundry burned down and when Joseph Lodge rebuilt, he re-named the company, Lodge Manufacturing.

Lodge Manufacturing is one of America's oldest cookware companies in operation. Joseph Lodge and his wife settled in South Pittsburg, Tennessee, a town of 3,000 people along the Tennessee River beside the Cumberland Plateau. The Lodge family has kept in Marion County in Tennessee and employing its residents. The towns population at 3,100, of which 400 are employed by Lodge.

In the late 1950s–1965 Lodge transferred its molding and casting process to a revolutionary automated system. In 1973, their iconic recognizable logo was created and is still used today.

In 2002, Lodge became the first cast-iron cookware manufacturer to season their products in the foundry.

In 2013, Lodge started their carbon steel cookware line making high-quality carbon steel cookware. Lodge introduced a line of enameled cast-iron cookware in 2005; this was to match the ability of European manufacturers' abilities.

In 2017, Lodge opened their second foundry, increasing their manufacturing capacity by 75%. The facility is a 127,000-square-foot foundry, which increased production by 75%. The foundry is located in New Hope, Tennessee.

In July 2019, Lodge unveiled seven new cast-iron cookware products under the label Blacklock, a new lighter gourmet line of skillets and ovens. In August 2019, Lodge announced the acquisition of startup FINEX Cast Iron Cookware, based in Portland, Oregon.

The Lodge Museum of Cast Iron, built in collaboration with the Southern Foodways Alliance, opened in October 2022.

== Products ==
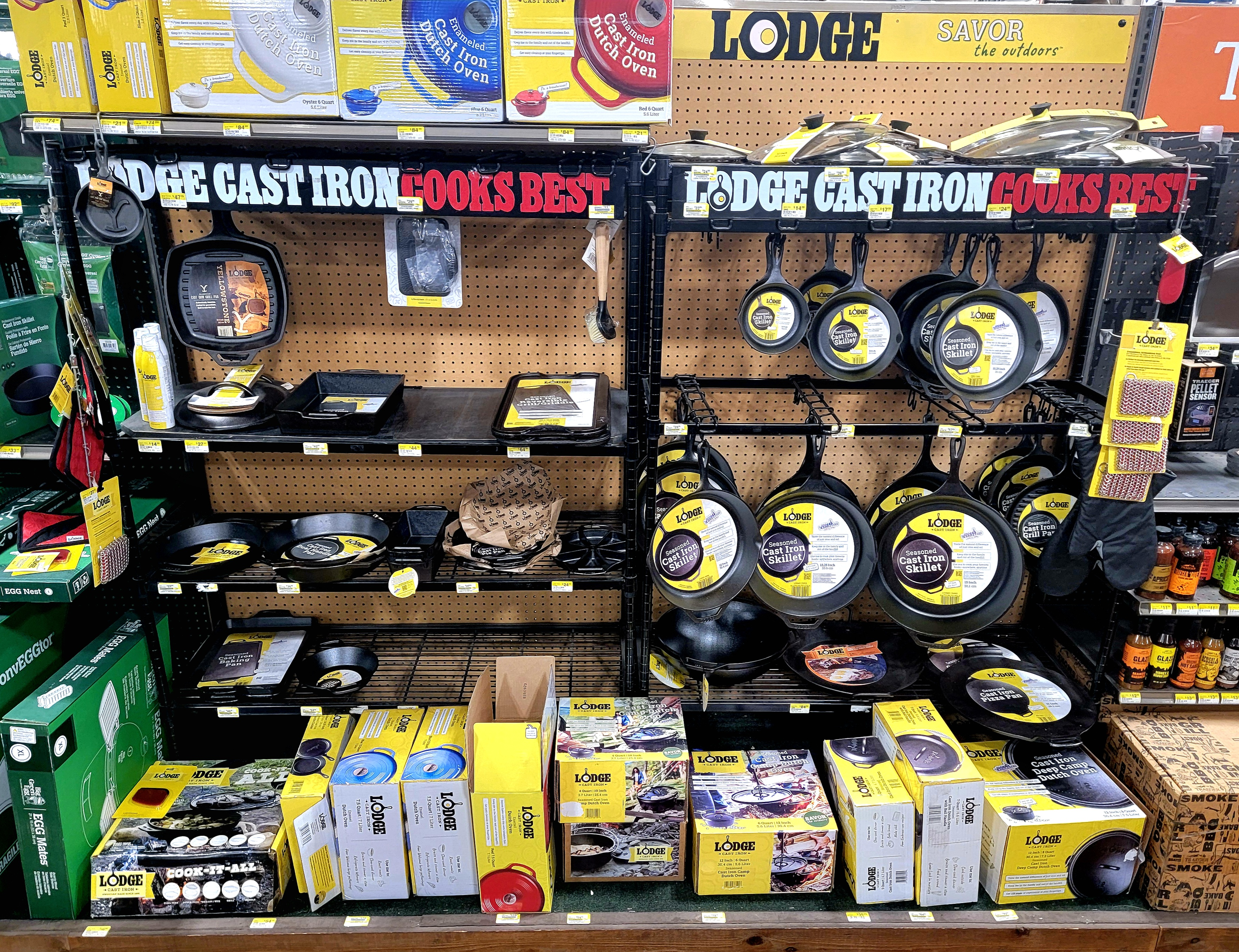
Lodge Cast Iron retail display

Original cast-iron cookware was made using sand and building the mold within the sand. Workers would then pour in iron.

== See also ==
- Dutch oven
- List of cast-iron cookware manufacturers
