= Staub (cookware) =

French cookware manufacturer

- Current owner: Zwilling J. A. Henckels
- Country: Alsace, France
- Website: www.zwilling.com/us/staub/
- Industry: Cookware and bakeware products
- Founded: 1974
- Founder: Francis Staub

Staub is a premium French enameled cast iron cookware and bakeware manufacturer that was originally headquartered in Turckheim, Alsace, France.

The first piece, a cocotte or coquelle (Dutch oven), was designed by Francis Staub in 1974 in a dormant artillery factory. Pieces are manufactured with cast iron covered with double-glazed enamel.

== Company overview ==
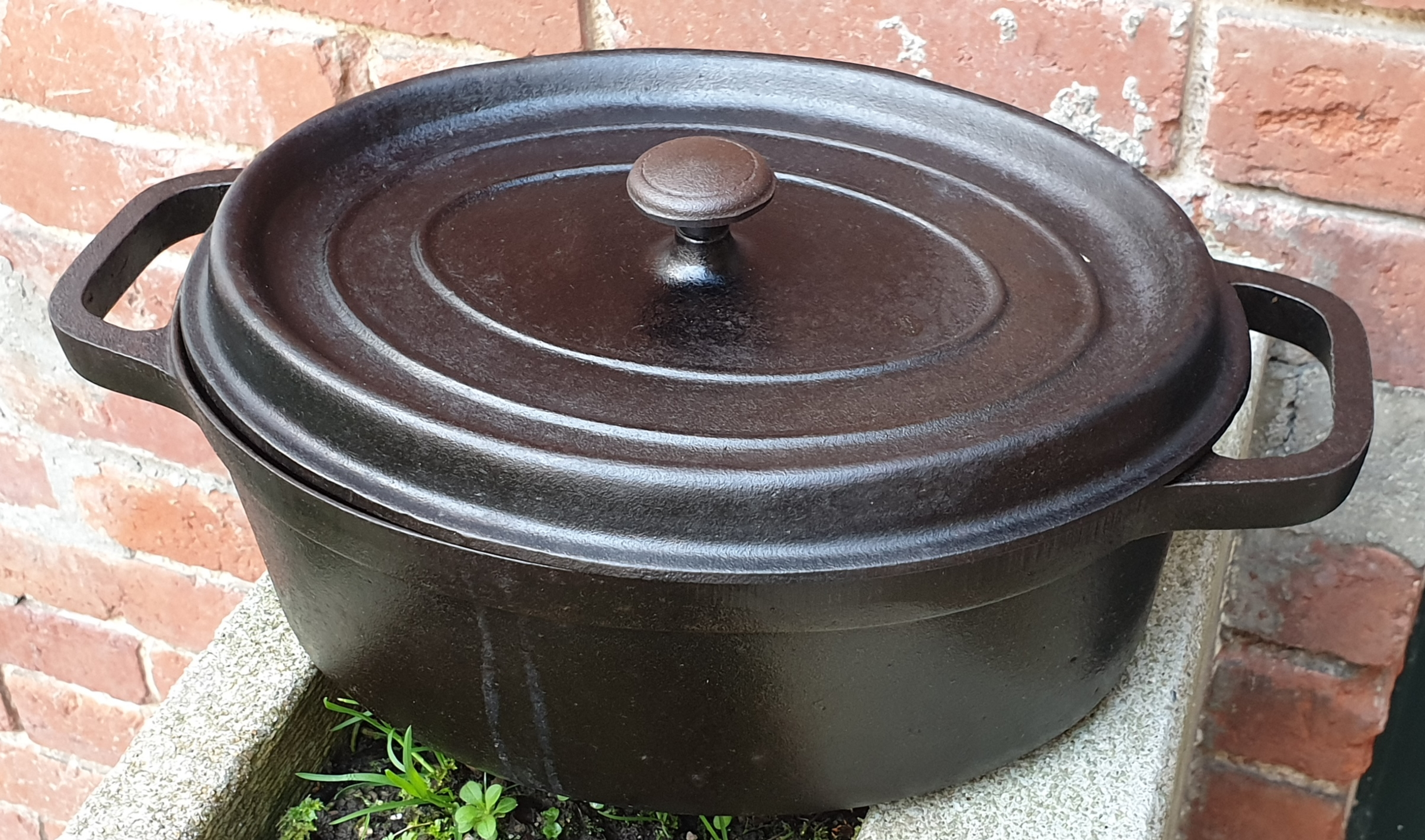
Oval Staub casserole dish in raw cast iron, from the beginning of production.

In 2007, approximately 50% of the company's sales revenue came from abroad, and the company generated a total of €44 million in sales. In April 2008, the company had 430 employees, and at this time Francis Staub was president of the company.

=== Production ===
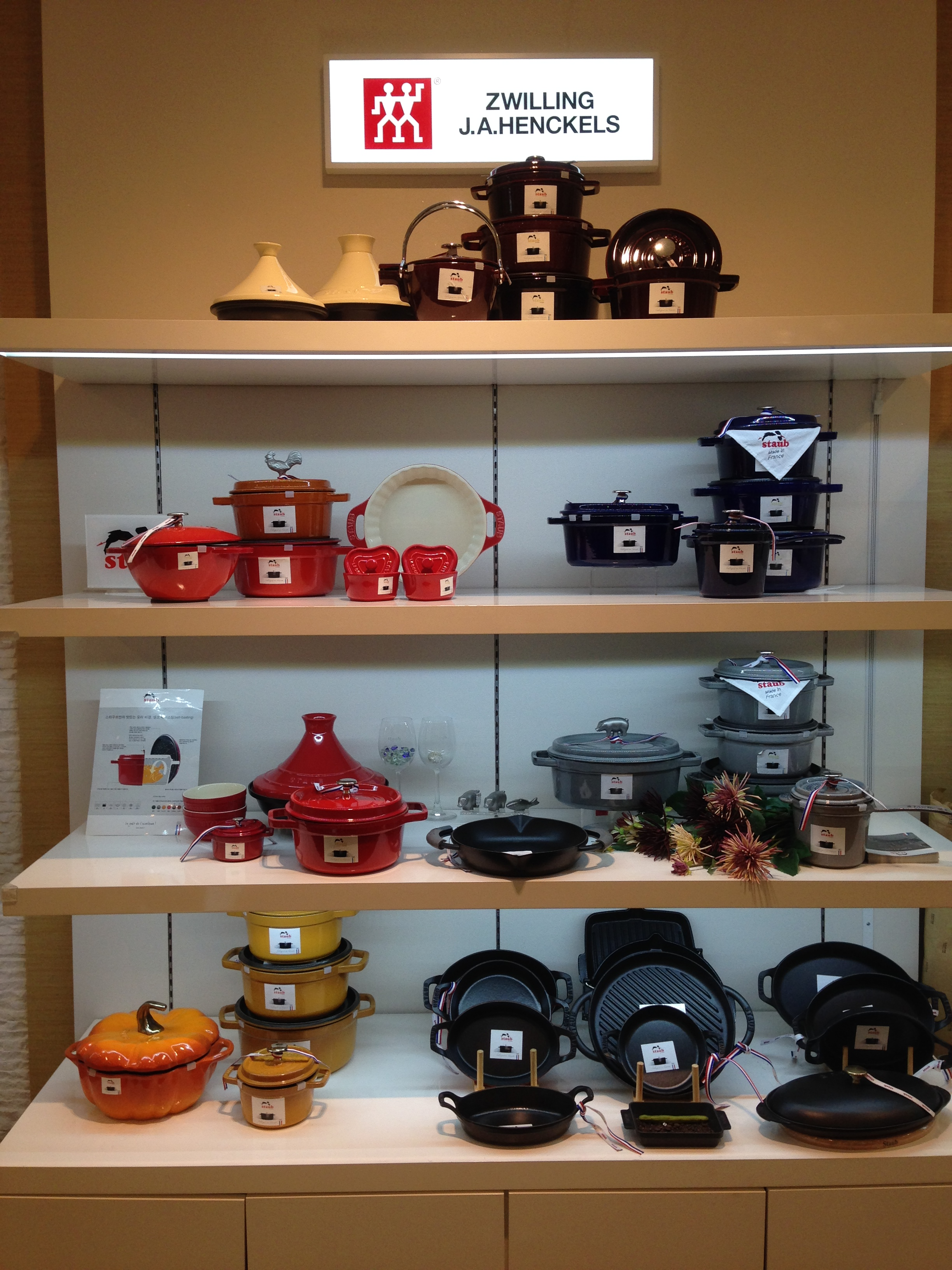
Staub products

In 2008, Staub operated three production facilities in France, a joint venture in Japan, and a marketing branch in the United States.

=== Acquisition ===
In June 2008, Staub was acquired by Zwilling J. A. Henckels, but it remains and has continued to operate as an independent brand.

== Professional use ==
The cookware's aesthetic complements the decor of some restaurants; some restaurants cook and serve dishes directly to customers at their tables in Staub cookware. The enamel coating makes the cookware rustproof, and easy to clean. Staub's cocottes have nubs on the interior of the lids, which enables condensation to collect and drip down to baste foods uniformly as they are cooking.
