= Le Creuset =

Cookware manufacturer

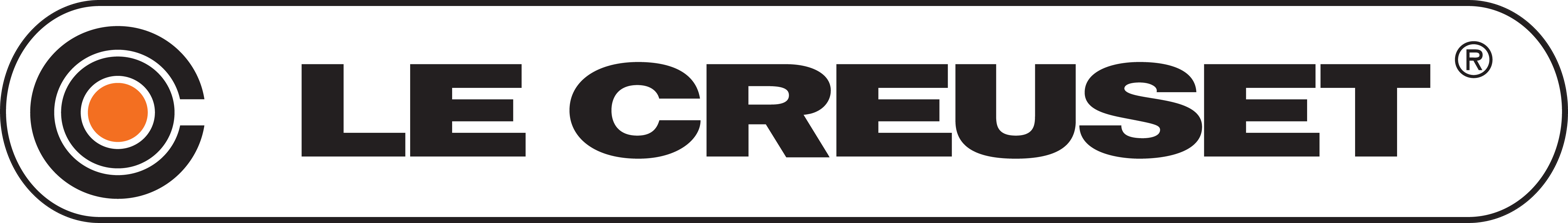
- Type: SAS
- Industry: Cookware
- Founded: 1925; 101 years ago
- Founder: Armand De Saegher; Octave Aubecq
- Headquarters: Zug, Switzerland
- Number of locations: 37
- Key people: Paul van Zuydam (president)
- Revenue: $850,000,000 (2025)
- Owner: Paul van Zuydam
- Website: www.lecreuset.com

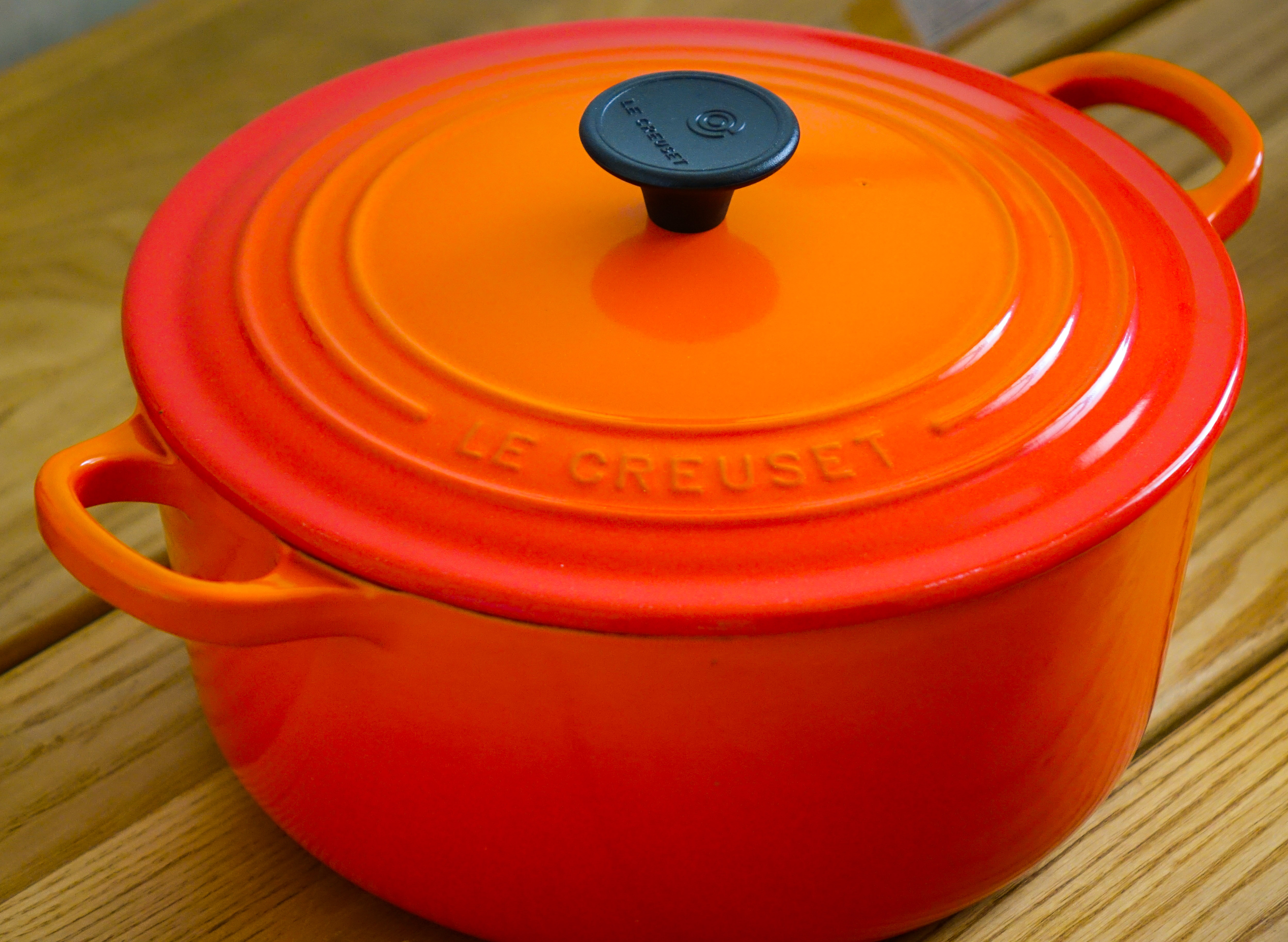
Casserole in "Volcanic Flame" orange

Le Creuset (French pronunciation: [lə kʁøzɛ], lit. 'the crucible') is a French–Belgian cookware manufacturer known for its enameled cast-iron cookware. The company first manufactured their products in the town of Fresnoy-le-Grand in France in 1925, and now makes many other types of cookware and bakeware, from fondue sets to tagines.

== History ==
Le Creuset was founded in Fresnoy-le-Grand, Aisne, Picardy at the crossroads of transportation routes for iron, coke, and sand. Armand De Saegher (a Belgian casting specialist) and Octave Aubecq (a Belgian enamelling specialist) opened the foundry in 1925. That same year, the first cocotte (or French oven) was produced, laying the foundation for what is now an extensive range of cookware and kitchen utensils. Flame (orange) was used for the first piece.

During World War II, Le Creuset began to focus on continually improving cast iron.

In 1957, Le Creuset purchased a competitor, Les Hauts Fourneaux de Cousances, and began producing items such as a grill and a fondue set.

In 1958, Raymond Loewy was commissioned to design a new streamlined casserole pot to target a younger generation, creating the "Coquelle".

The cookery writer Elizabeth David promoted Mediterranean cooking in the UK and was a Le Creuset promoter, particularly in her 1969 booklet 'Cooking with Le Creuset'. One of the colours of blue in the cookware range was created for her.

The current Le Creuset logo was introduced in 1970 as a symbolic representation of metal casting and moulding.

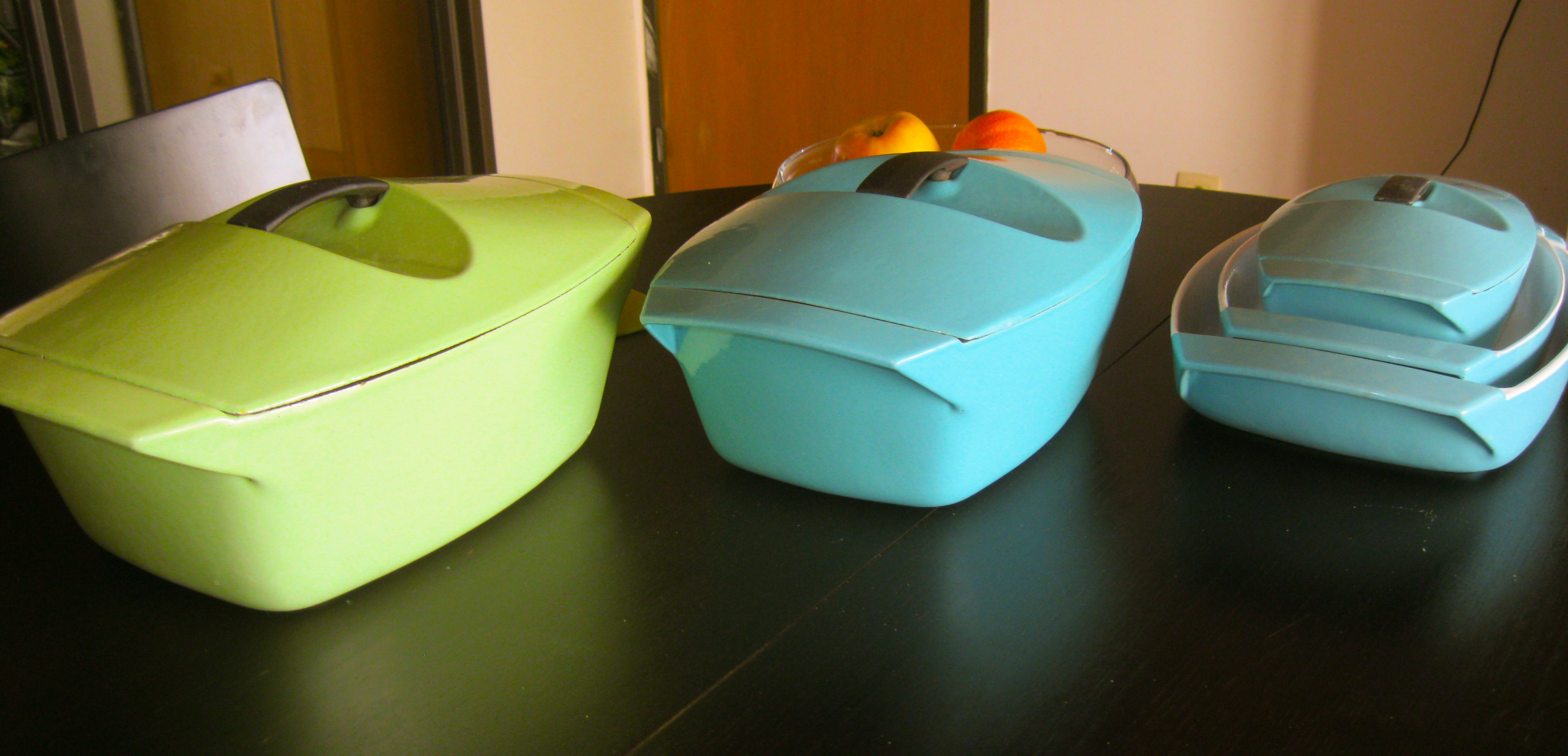
Dutch ovens or "coquelles" designed by Raymond Loewy

In the 1970s Enzo Mari designed distinctive Dutch ovens and saucepans with domed lids and typical handles. In the 1980s, JC Barrault's "Futura" line was launched.

A Le Creuset Dutch oven is on display in the Smithsonian Institution's National Museum of American History in Washington, D.C. as a part of the reproduction display of the kitchen of chef Julia Child. It has been widely reported to be her favorite cooking pot. (Specialist sources, however, hold that it was the Dutch oven of Le Creuset's less-remembered competitor Descoware that was her real favorite.)

The company was purchased by Paul van Zuydam in 1988.

In 1995, Le Creuset began exploring new product categories: stainless steel, stoneware, silicone, enamel on steel, textiles, and forged hard-anodized aluminum.

Le Creuset offers a variety of colours, ranging from bright (e.g., cherry, a gradated red) to muted (e.g., dune, a gradated off-white). Its discontinued colours include cobalt (gradated blue-violet), black onyx (solid black), kiwi (gradated light green), as well as slate, granite, cactus, and citron. In addition to their standard colours, Le Creuset partners with major kitchenware retail brands such as Williams-Sonoma and Sur La Table to offer unique "exclusive" colours which are only available for purchase through their respective stores.

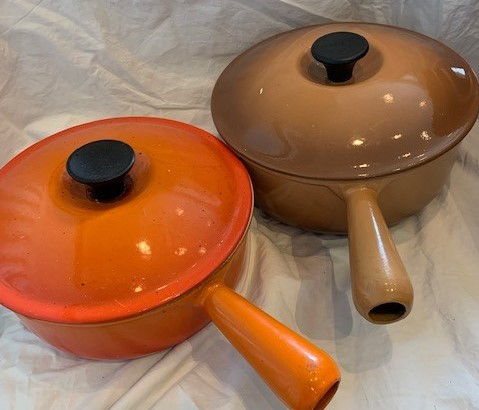
Le Creuset saucepans

During the 2020 pandemic lockdowns, Le Creuset cookware gained online traction and increased consumer interest, driven by home-cooking trends and its positioning as a premium cookware brand.

== Production ==
To manufacture their cast-iron cookware, the Le Creuset foundry uses standard sand casting methods. After hand-finishing, items are sprayed with at least two coats of enamel. The Le Creuset Signature range of cast-iron cookware is coated in a minimum of three coats of enamel. The enamel becomes resistant to damage during normal use. Currently, all Le Creuset cast-iron cookware is still manufactured in the company's foundry in Fresnoy-le-Grand. The process was featured on BBC Two's Inside the Factory.

Le Creuset products that are not cast-iron may be made in other countries, such as China (accessories and silicone products), Thailand (kettles and ceramics), England (enamel cleaner), Portugal (stainless steel), and Eswatini (clay pots).

== Image gallery ==
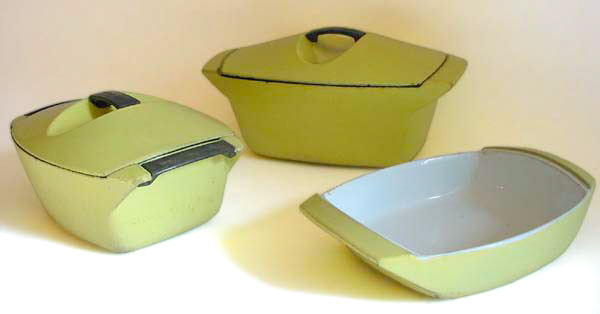
Vintage casseroles by Raymond Loewy

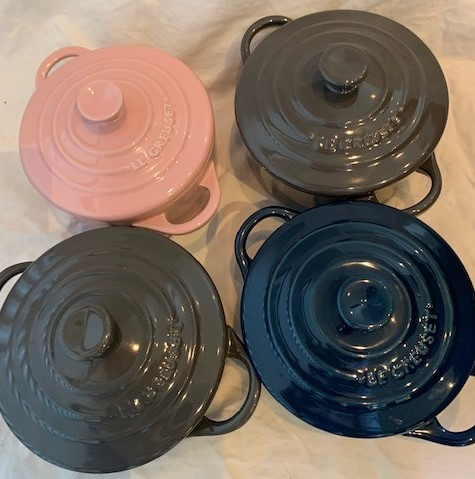
Individual casseroles

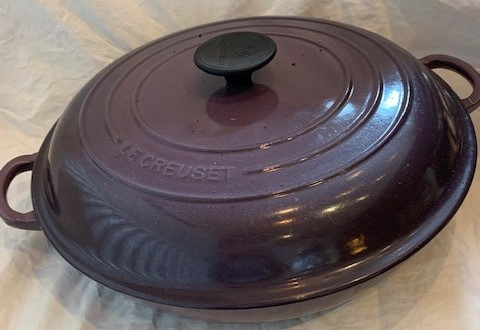
Shallow casserole in 'Cassis' colour

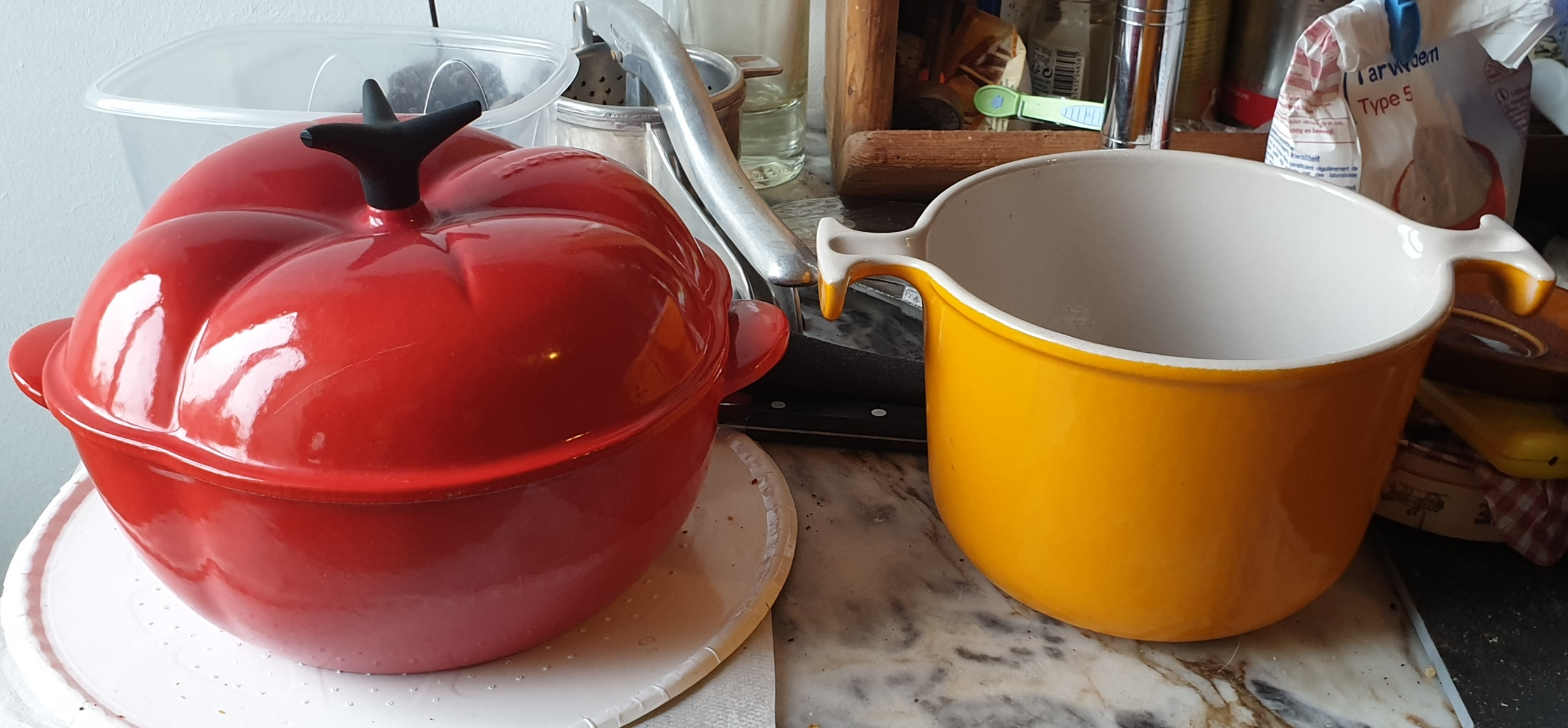
Fondue pot designed by Enzo Mari

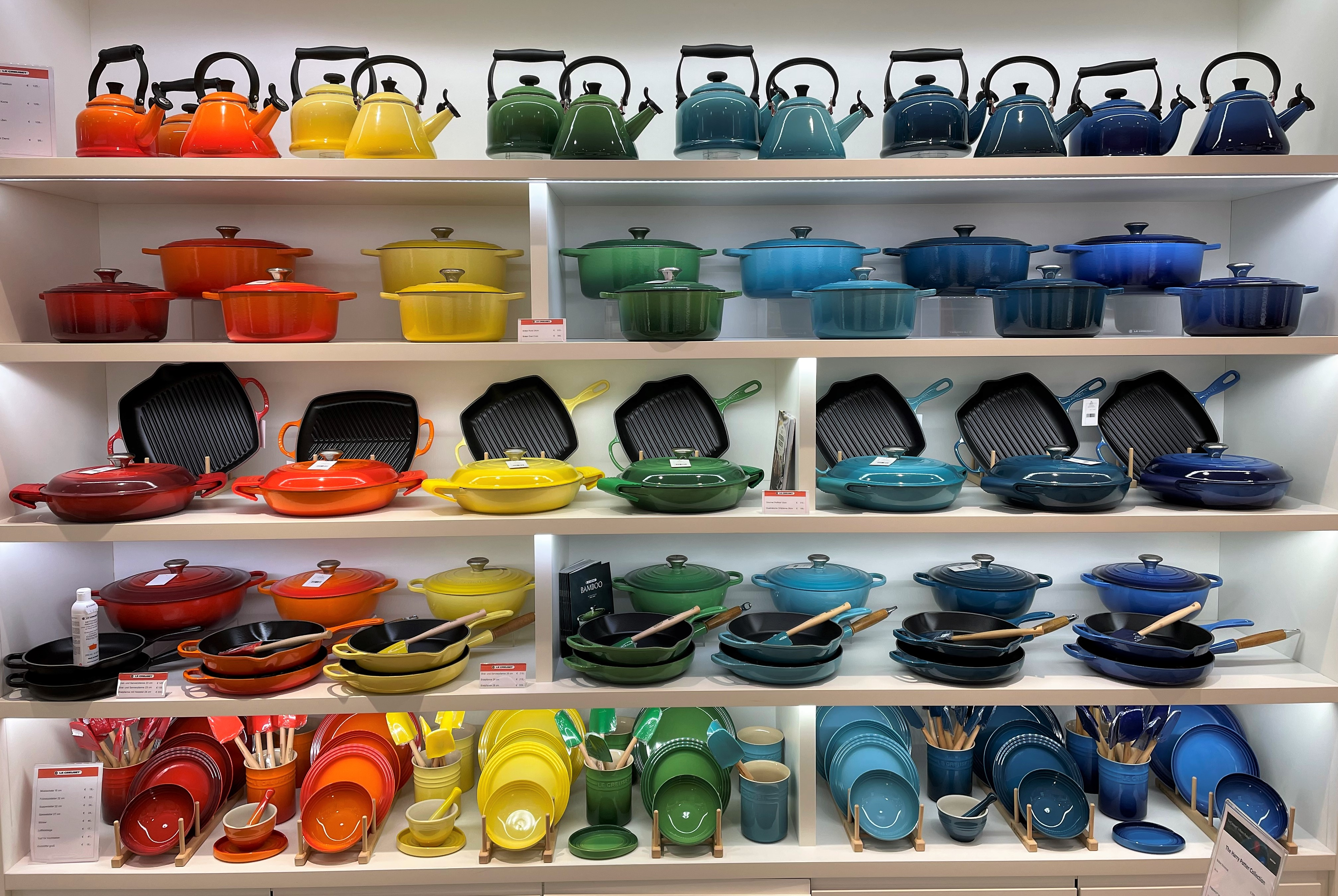
Le Creuset shop display

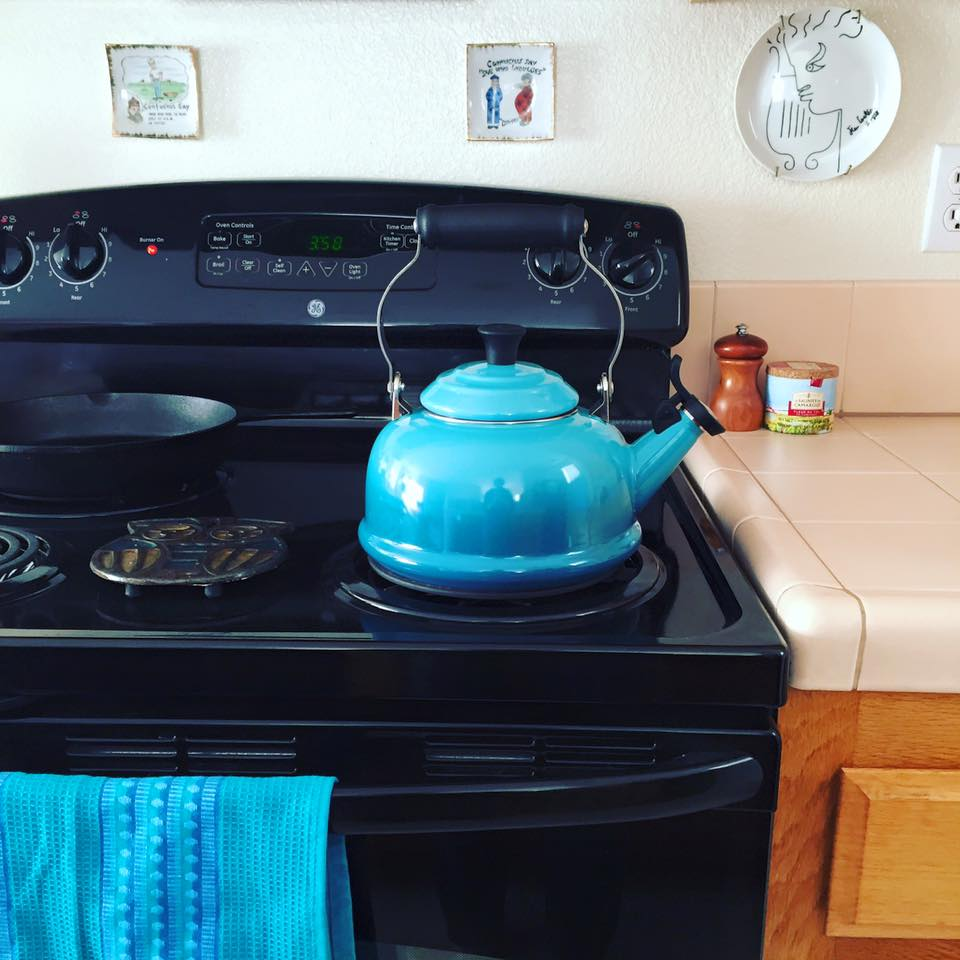
Le Creuset tea kettle

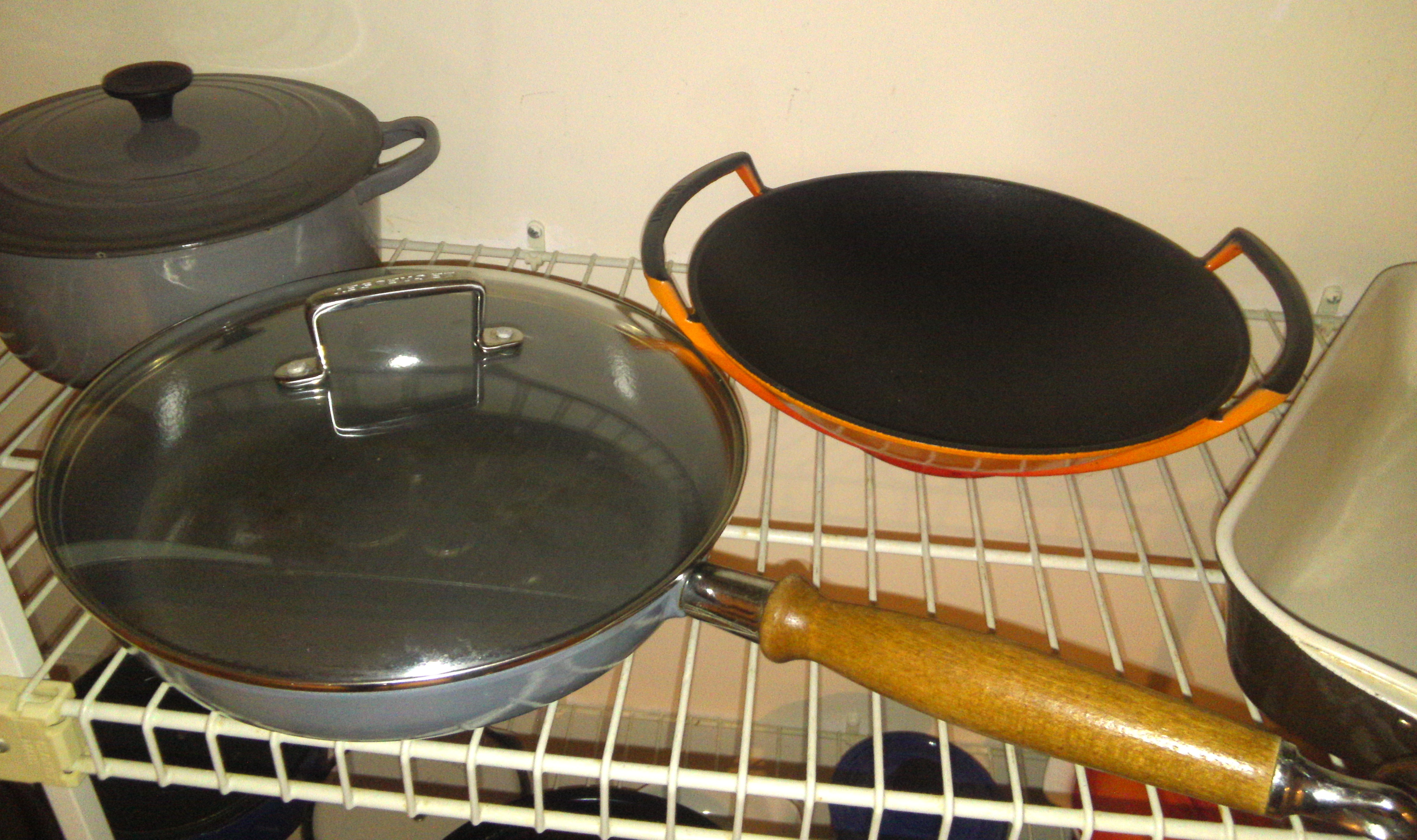
From left: Le Creuset Dutch oven, saute pan, small wok, and rectangular baker

== See also ==
- Cousances
- Descoware
- Druware
