= Druware =

Former Dutch cast iron cookware brand

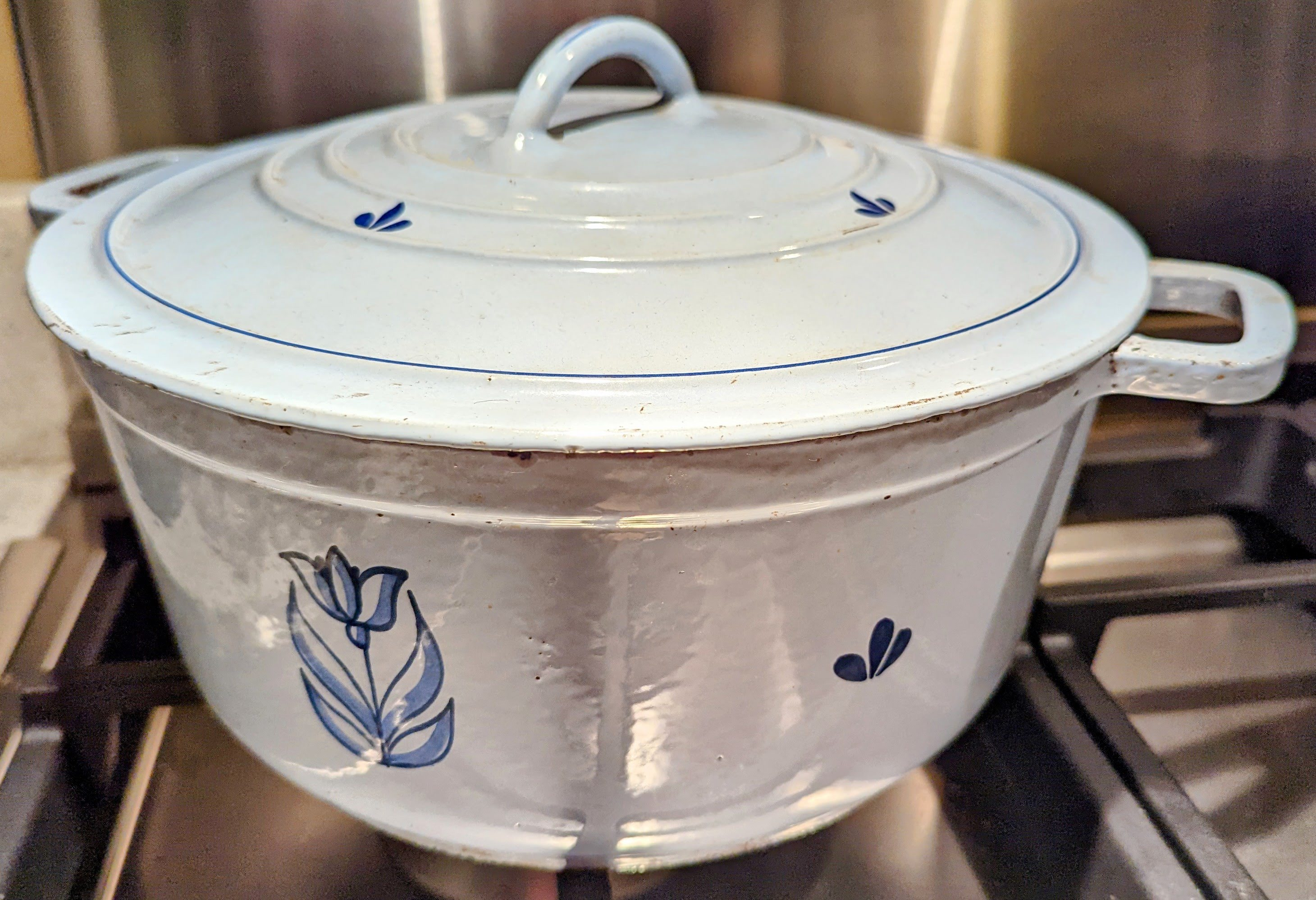
Delft Blue Druware Dutch Oven

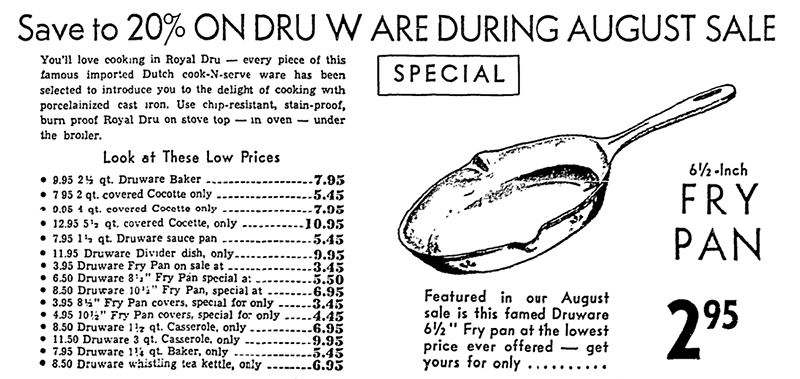
Newspaper advertisement for a sale on Druware

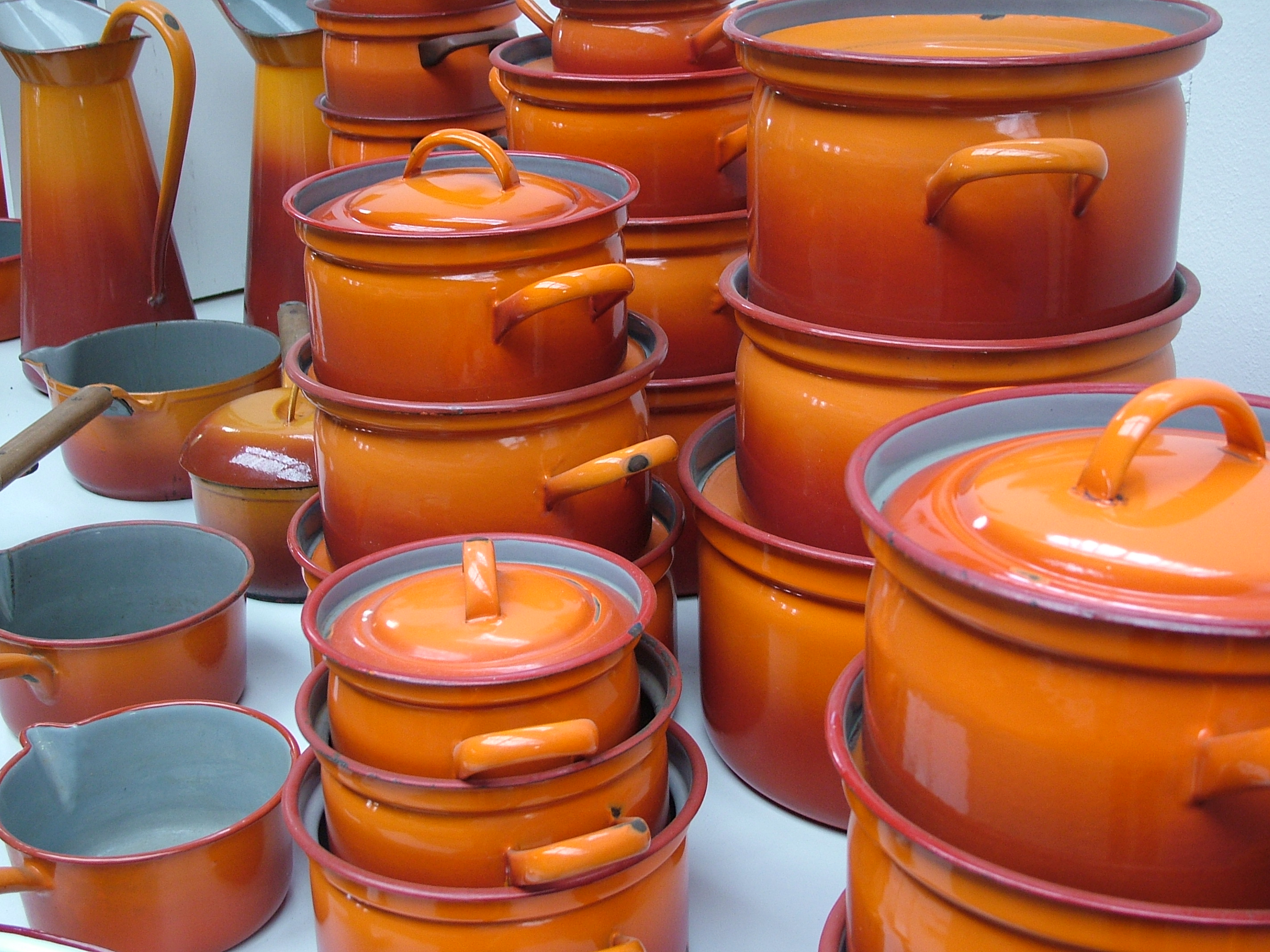
DRU Enameled Cookware

Druware, also known as DRU Holland cookware and Royal Dru, was a line of porcelain-enamel-coated cast-iron cookware made by the De Koninklijke Diepenbrock & Reigers of Ulft (DRU) company in Achterhoek, Netherlands.

== Imports to the United States ==
The pots and pans were popular in the United States during the middle of the 20th century, after Robert Evans began importing the cookware from the Netherlands, with gross annual sales of $1.5 million in 1956, and nearly $2 million in 1957.

"American housewives have been snapping up the Evans-designed green, blue and yellow 'cook-and-serve' vessels faster than many stores can keep them in stock. Known as Royal Dru, the cookware is the adaptation of a 200-year-old Dutch process of fusing iron to enamel so that it won't crack or chip from heat or rough handling."

In 1960, DRU incorporated a wholly owned subsidiary in Cambridge, Massachusetts, to manage distribution.

== Popularity ==
The most popular line of Druware came in pastel shades of Delft Blue, Tulip Yellow, and Key Largo Green, and was recognizable for the hand-painted tulip, windmill, and fleur-de-lis decorations on the sides and lids of each piece. A flame orange color, as well as "Holiday White" (white enamel, with the signature tulip design in blue) and an all-white color "that resembles china" were also produced.

Despite Druware's popularity with home cooks, venerable chef James Beard was less impressed. "I use the old lines of cast iron -- Griswold, Wagner -- not all this prettied stuff. I had a Druware pot simply split from the heat a day or two ago."

== Cessation of production ==
After natural gas became popular in the Netherlands in the 1960s, DRU ceased the production of cookware, and began producing fireplaces, wall heaters, and wood stoves.

== Influence ==
Druware was the design inspiration for Dutch Ovenware, a line of pottery produced by Cameron Clay Products, of Cameron, West Virginia.

== See also ==
- Le Creuset
- Descoware
- Cousances
