= Griswold Manufacturing =

American manufacturer of cast iron kitchen products

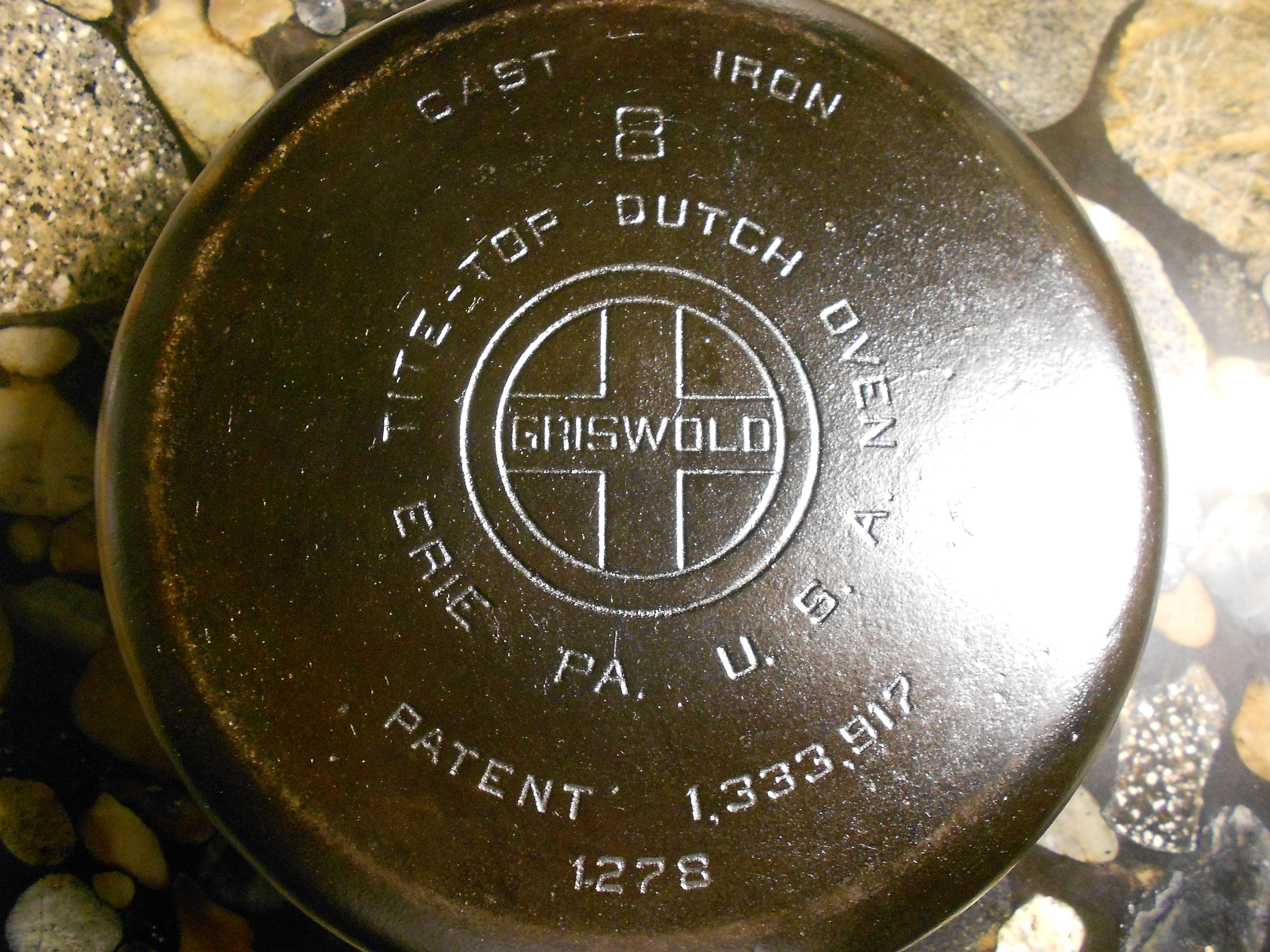
- Base of Griswold #8 sized cast iron dutch oven bearing the Griswold "large logo"
- Industry: Cast-iron cookware
- Founded: 1865; 161 years ago
- Founder: Matthew Griswold; Selden brothers
- Defunct: 1957; 69 years ago
- Fate: Acquired
- Successor: McGraw-Edison
- Headquarters: Erie, Pennsylvania, United States

Griswold Manufacturing (/ˈɡrɪzwɔːld, -wəld/) was an American manufacturer of cast-iron kitchen products founded in Erie, Pennsylvania, in business from 1865 through 1957. For many years the company had a world-wide reputation for high-quality cast-iron cookware. Today, Griswold pieces are collector's items.

== Early years ==
The Seldon-Griswold Manufacturing Company was founded in Erie, Pennsylvania, in 1865 by Matthew Griswold (born 6 June 1833) and his cousins, the brothers J.C. and Samuel Selden.

The company made separable butt hinges and other light hardware products at a building called the "Butt Factory" beside the Erie Extension Canal. Other products were stovepipe dampers, thimbles, and other stove furniture.

== Growth ==
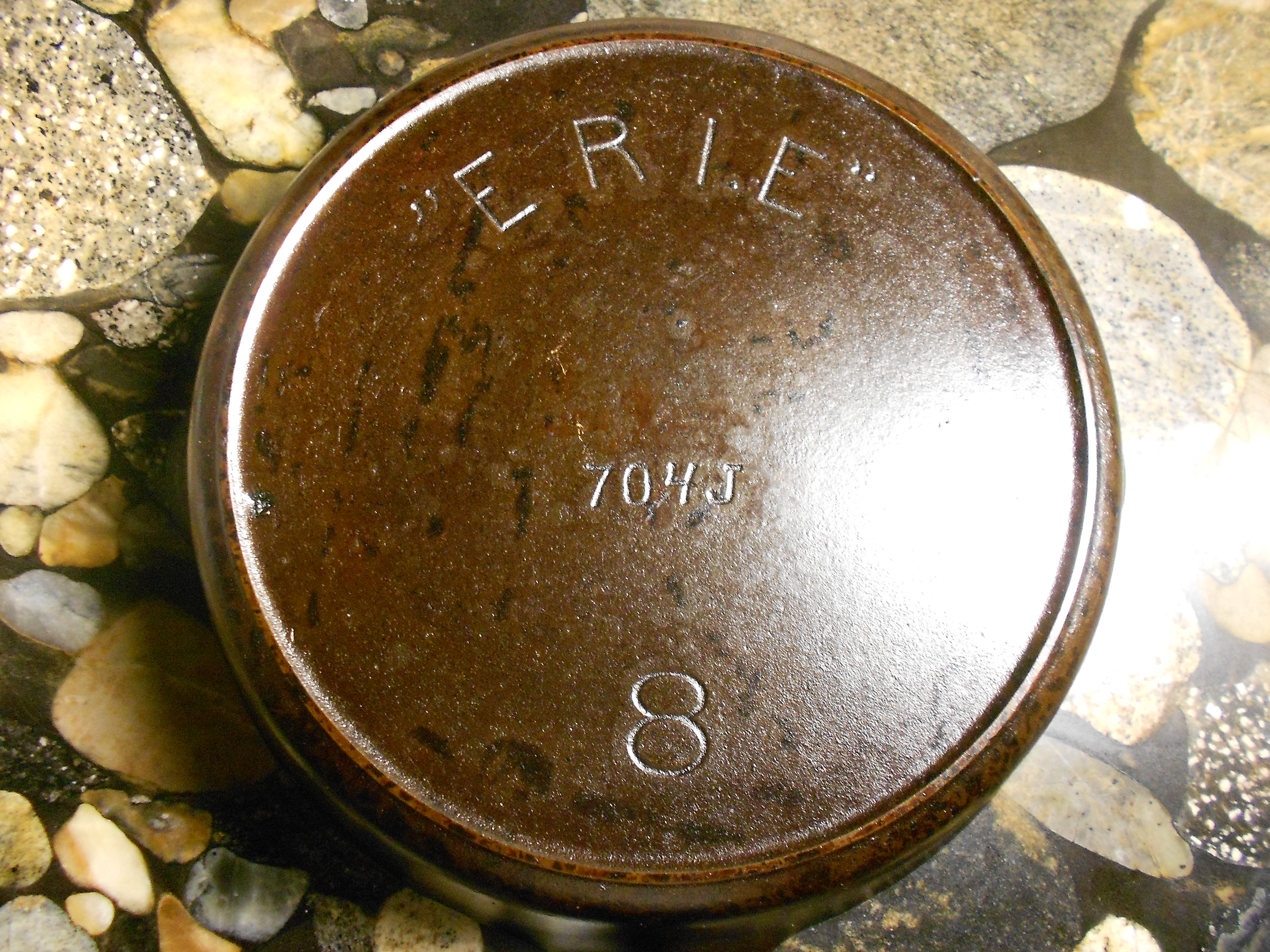
Griswold "Erie" cast-iron skillet, using "Erie" logo before the "Griswold" logo was used.

In the 1870s, Griswold began to manufacture skillets, pots, grinding mills and waffle irons. The company was renamed Selden & Griswold Manufacturing Company in 1873. In 1884 Matthew Griswold bought out the interests of the Selden family. The next year there was a fire, and the factory had to be rebuilt. In 1887 the company was reorganized and chartered as the Griswold Manufacturing Company.

Matthew Griswold was twice elected as a Republican to Congress, sitting from March 1891 to March 1893, and from March 1895 to 1897. He died on 19 May 1919. His son, Matthew Griswold Junior, was president from 1905 to 1914.

The Griswold Plaza in Erie is named in honor of his efforts to develop downtown Erie with a post office and railway station. Matthew Junior's brother Marvin was president from 1914 until his death in 1926, during a period of rapid growth.

Griswold began making tobacco cutters in 1883. In 1884 Matthew Griswold patented and manufactured a wheeled spittoon. Over the years that followed the company added products such as kettles, Dutch ovens, roasters, a grid iron and other various pots and pans. Cast-iron stovetop waffle irons were one of the company's earliest and most successful products, manufactured into the 1930s.

The company gained a reputation for quality cast-iron products, particularly cookware, which were sold world-wide. The first aluminum cookware was a tea kettle made around 1893. In 1903 the company moved to new premises at 12th and Raspberry Streets. In the 1920s Griswold began producing enameled items, and in the 1930s had added electrical items to their product line. Griswold acquired many patents over the years.

Miss Etta Moses worked for Griswold for over 50 years. She was given the job of handling letters asking for advice on using the company's products. In the 1920s she began publishing recipes and advice on cooking with cast iron using the pen name of "Aunt Ellen".

"Aunt Ellen" was the author of Griswold's "Booklet on Waterless Cooking", given free to purchasers of the Tite-Top Dutch Oven. Her picture appeared in advertisements for the cook pot in journals such as Good Housekeeping.

A 1928 advertisement in Good Housekeeping described the Griswold Electric Waffle Baker, and invited readers to write to Aunt Ellen for details on making the waffle cream pie. Every day she dealt with a large correspondence from housewives asking for advice. She died in 1948.

== Dissolution ==
By the 1940s, the company was in financial difficulty, facing competition from manufacturers of more modern products while struggling with internal labor disputes and declining quality. Family members continued to own and run the company until 1946, when Ely Griswold sold it to a New York investment group and retired. In March 1957, McGraw-Edison of Chicago, Illinois, acquired Griswold Manufacturing. Later that year the Griswold brand and housewares division were sold to the Wagner Manufacturing Company of Sidney, Ohio. The plant in Erie, Pennsylvania, was closed in December 1957. When the factory closed, sixty people were laid off.

Randall Corporation, the owner of Wagner since 1952, sold both companies to Textron in 1959. Textron sold them to the General Housewares corporation in 1969. General Housewares made products under the Griswold and Wagner brands; though the Griswold name was phased out by the early 1970s. Wagner cast iron pans continued to be produced until the Wagner foundry closed in 1999. After this the Griswold and Wagner trademarks were acquired by American Culinary Corporation of Willoughby, Ohio, until the ownership expired. Classic cast-iron Griswold cookware is now prized by collectors. The main reason the items are collectible is that they have distinctive brand markings. Collectors should be wary of reproductions, which generally have a grainy finish and uneven and blurred lettering.

One is considered fortunate nowadays if by chance one of these iron utensils is handed down to them from the second to the third generation. It is on account of these wonderful Cast Iron utensils that you have such fond recollections of the rich, juicy steaks and chops your grandmother used to serve.

— Aunt Ellen

== Variations ==
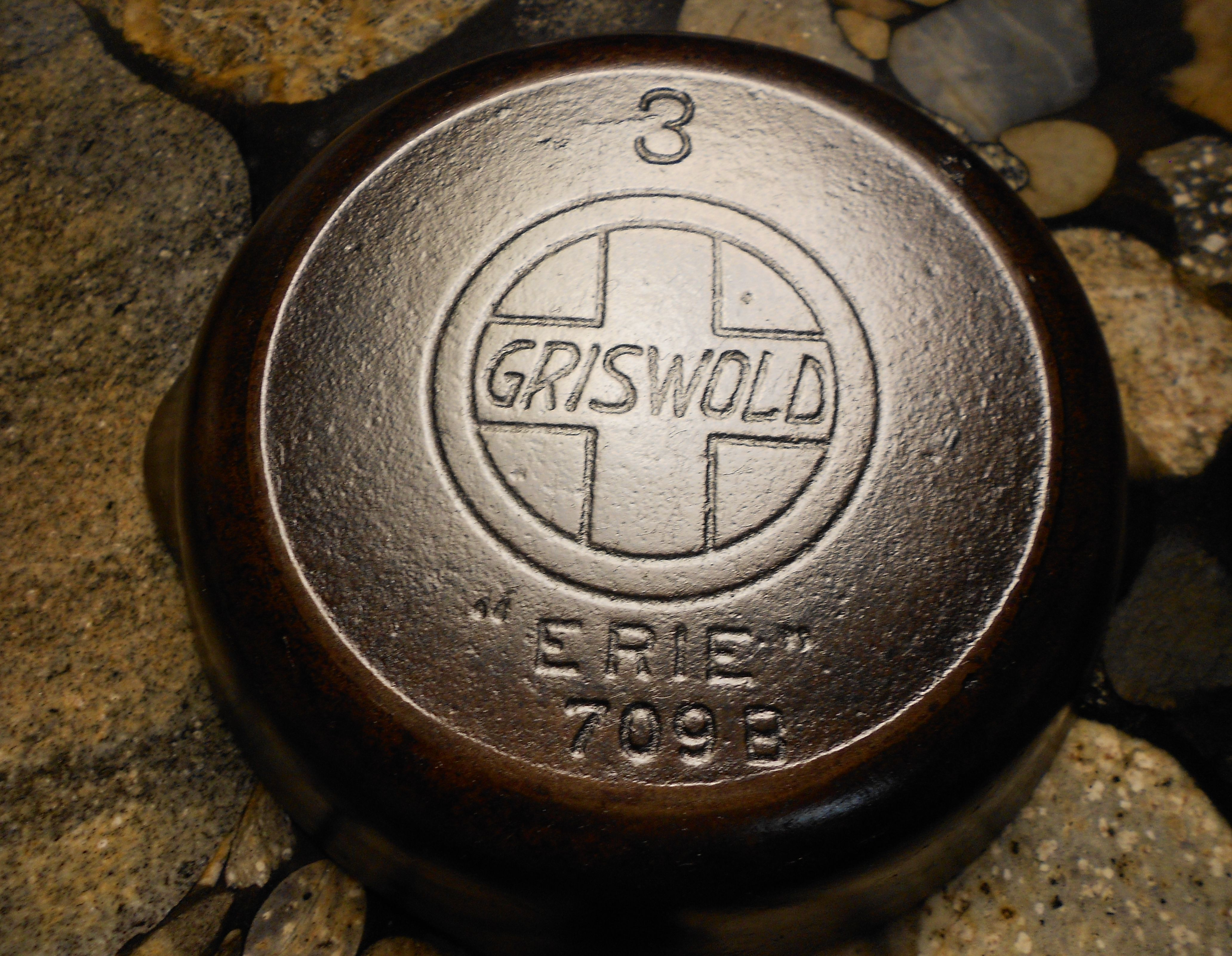
Griswold "slant logo" cast-iron skillet, manufactured approximately 1915

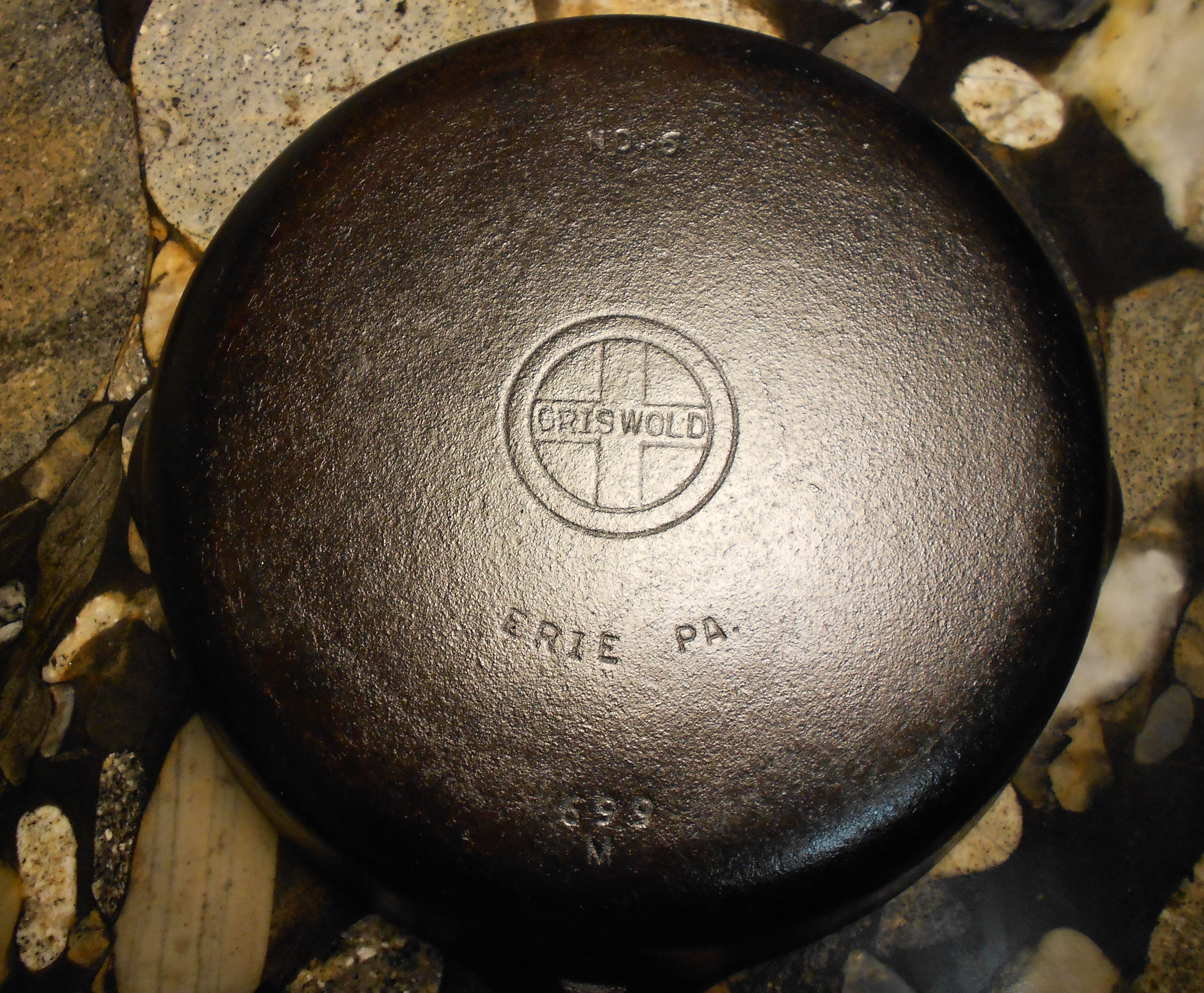
Griswold "small logo" cast-iron skillet, manufactured between 1940 and 1957

Griswold cast-iron pots and pans, skillets, dutch ovens, and other kitchen items had a reputation for high quality, and they are well known to antique collectors and sellers. The easily recognized "cross" logo seen on Griswold products from the 1910s through the 1960s was modified several times over the years. Historians and collectors note these modifications and use them to date these pieces, to give more accurate estimates of their age and approximate date of manufacture.

- The "Griswold cross" logo was first used by the manufacturer during the 1910s. For several years until the early 1920s, these pans had a slanted, slightly italicized "Griswold" name at the center of the cross. The age and quality of these pans make them among the most desirable for collectors, and as such they are often sold for high prices at antique malls and fairs.
- The logo was changed to block lettering during the 1920s through the 1930s. This version of the Griswold logo is the most popular and well known of the different variations, and images of this logo are often seen as the standard for representing collections of antique cast-iron cookware in general.
- During the early 1940s, Griswold changed its logo to a much smaller sized image, commonly known as the "small logo" Griswold. The company produced pans with this logo until its acquisition by the Randall corporation in 1957.
- After being acquired by Randall in 1957, the Griswold foundry and manufacturing plant in Erie, Pennsylvania was closed. Further cookware was produced at the Wagner foundry in Sidney, Ohio. Pans were produced with the Griswold logo from 1957 through the mid-1960s, though these pans did not include the "ERIE PA." mark. In the early-to-mid 1960s, a number of pans were produced with dual logos, displaying the images of both Griswold and Wagner. The Griswold logo was phased out by the late 1960s, and further cast iron from General Housewares was labeled with the Wagner Ware logo.

== See also ==
- List of cast-iron cookware manufacturers
