= Fresnoy-le-Grand =

- Commune
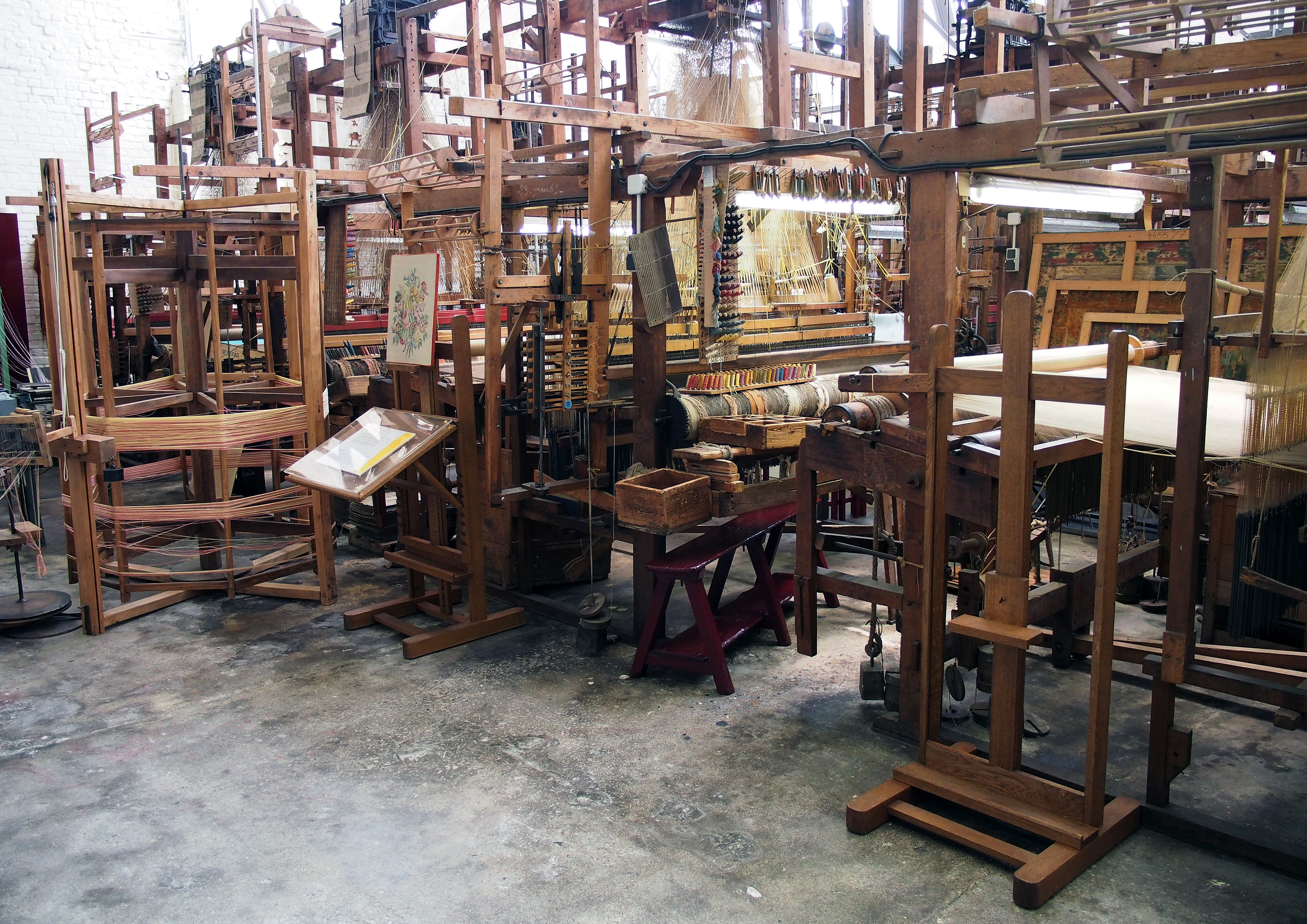
- Textile factory

- Coat of arms
- Location of Fresnoy-le-Grand
- Location within France Location within Hauts-de-France
- Coordinates: 49°56′53″N 3°25′06″E
- Country: France
- Region: Hauts-de-France
- Department: Aisne
- Arrondissement: Saint-Quentin
- Canton: Bohain-en-Vermandois
- Intercommunality: Pays du Vermandois

Government
  - Mayor (2026–32): Eric Denis
- Area^{1}: 15.07 km^{2} (5.82 sq mi)
- Elevation: 157 m (515 ft)
- Highest elevation: 157 m (515 ft)
- Lowest elevation: 96 m (315 ft)
- Population (2023): 2,890
  - Density: 192/km^{2} (497/sq mi)
- Time zone: UTC+01:00 (CET)
  - Summer (DST): UTC+02:00 (CEST)
- INSEE/Postal code: 02334 /02230
- ^{1} French Land Register data, which excludes lakes, ponds, glaciers > 1 km^{2} (0.386 sq mi or 247 acres) and river estuaries.

Fresnoy-le-Grand (French pronunciation: [fʁɛnwa lə ɡʁɑ̃]) is a commune in the Aisne department in Hauts-de-France in northern France.

== Industry ==
The cookware manufacturer Le Creuset is based in the town and was founded there in 1925 by Armand Desaegher and Octave Aubecq.

== Sport ==
The village has a strong athletic club which was formed in 1942 and is called the Association Sportive de Fresnoy (ASF).

== Population ==
The inhabitants of Fresnoy-le-Grand are called Fresnoysiens in French.

Historical population
Year	Pop.	±% p.a.
1968	3,371	—
1975	3,729	+1.45%
1982	3,635	−0.36%
1990	3,581	−0.19%
1999	3,272	−1.00%
2007	3,019	−1.00%
2012	3,049	+0.20%
2017	2,945	−0.69%
2023	2,890	−0.31%
Source: INSEE

== See also ==
- Communes of the Aisne department
