= Descoware =

Cast iron cookware brand

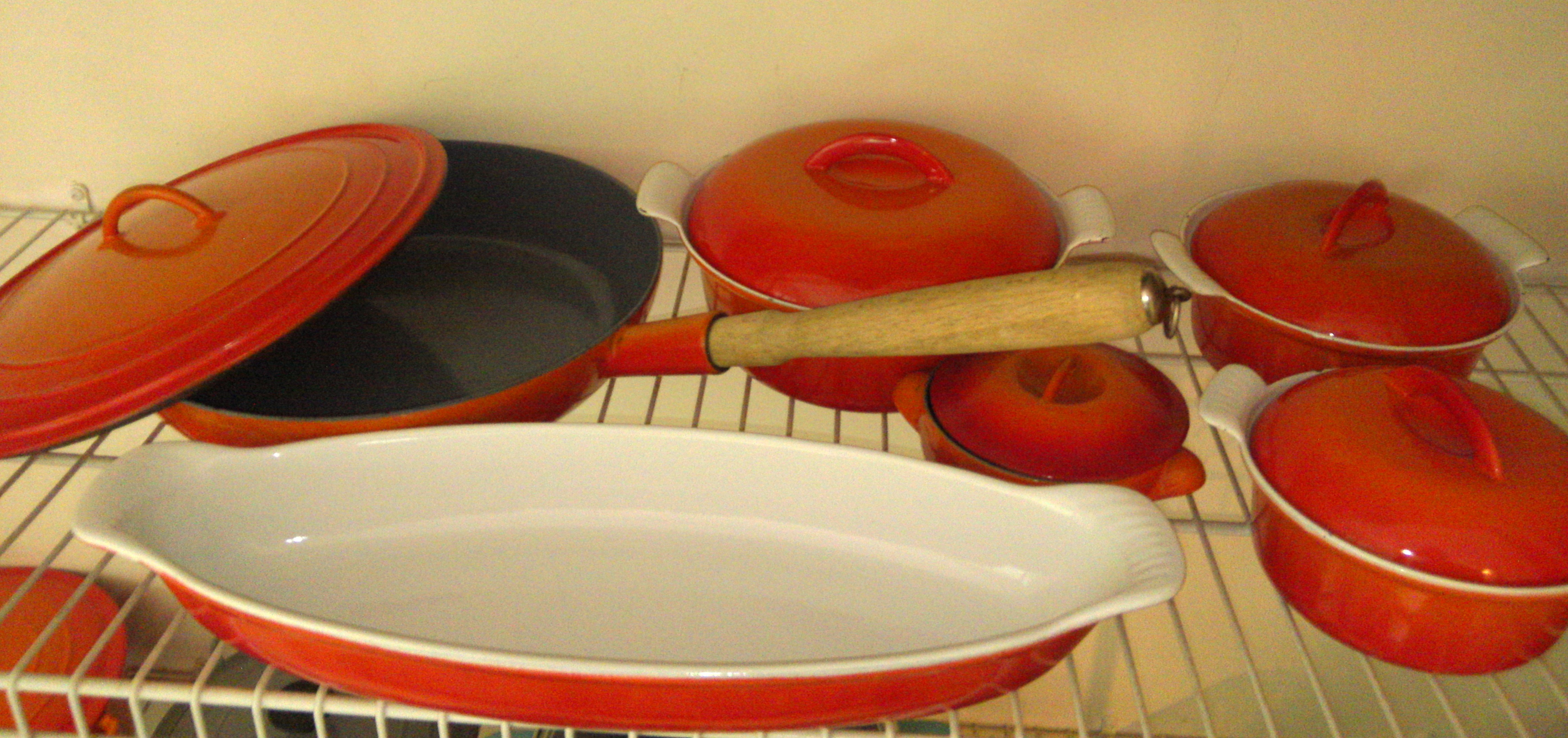
Descoware enameled cast-iron cookware. (Back left poêle à frire with lid, front: fish baker, back right: round terrines of different sizes

Descoware is a discontinued brand of porcelain- or enamel-coated cast-iron cookware Among notable Descoware pots are dutch ovens. Although Descoware is now little-remembered, specialist sources hold that it was the favorite cooking ware of American cooking instructor and television personality Julia Child, more so than Le Creuset, whose association with the chef has been widely reported. Child regularly used Descoware on her television show The French Chef. The Smithsonian Institution's installation about Child's kitchen featured a large orange Descoware pot on top of Child's own stove.

It was created by David E. Sanford of the D.E. Sanford Company, later known as Desco Corporation. Sanford purchased the manufacturing rights to the Bruxelles Ware process from General Housewares Corporation in the 1940s, giving him the right to sell the products in the United States.

Bruxelles Ware was originally manufactured in France. Sanford changed the brand name, and contracted to have Descoware manufactured in the 1950s. After forging in Japan, the wares were sent to be porcelainized in updated colors in Belgium. Descoware weighed about 35 percent less than competing brands of cast-iron cookware, giving it a decided advantage. Descoware also offered matching porcelain-coated aluminum accessories.

The economic growth that Descoware generated helped both the Belgian and Japanese economies recover from World War II, and Sanford was Knighted in the name of Belgium's King Baudouin I in 1958 for his role in trade relations.

Descoware remains a sought-after brand of cookware and has a loyal fanbase; single pieces are often found in thrift stores, and may fetch from US$20 to over $150.00 on eBay. Two of the original colors were originally called cherry flame and citron, but are referred to as orange flame and yellow today. While yellow and orange were common, there were pieces made in other colors, including blue, as well.

== See also ==
- Cousances
- Druware
- Le Creuset
