= Wagner Manufacturing Company =

Former American metalworking manufacturer

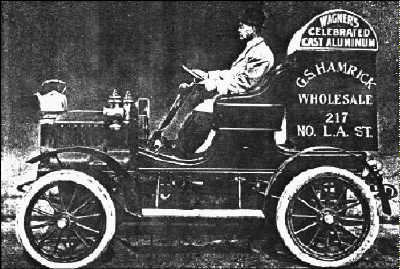
- Wagner salesman c. 1910
- Industry: Cookware
- Founded: 1891 in Sidney, Ohio, US
- Founder: Milton M. and Bernard P. Wagner
- Defunct: 1953
- Fate: Acquired by Randall Company
- Headquarters: Sidney, Ohio, US
- Brands: Magnalite, Wagner Ware, National, Long Life, Wardway and Ward's Cast Iron

The Wagner Manufacturing Company was a family-owned manufacturer of cast iron and aluminum products based in Sidney, Ohio, US. It made products for domestic use such as frying pans, casseroles, kettles and baking trays, and also made metal products other than cookware. Wagner was active between 1891 and 1952, and at one time dominated the cookware market, selling in Europe and the US. Subsequent owners of the company continued to operate the Sidney plant until it closed in 1999. As of 2022, the newly formed Wagner Cast Iron manufactures reissues of historic Wagner products.

== Foundation ==
The Wagner Manufacturing Company was founded by the brothers Milton M. and Bernard P. Wagner in Sidney, Shelby County, Ohio. The architect Joseph Altenbach started construction of the Wagner manufacturing complex in 1890. He was a friend of the family head Mathias Wagner, and was responsible for many of the major buildings in Sidney during that period. The company was incorporated in 1891. The principal owners were Bernard, Milton, Louis, and William Wagner. The brothers were joined by R.O. Bingham, who had in the past worked at the Marion Stove Works and the Sidney Manufacturing Company, who became superintendent of the company.

== Operation ==
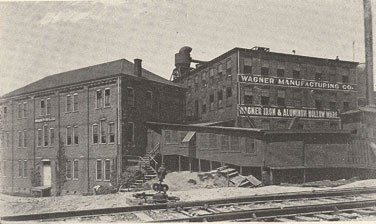
Wagner Manufacturing plant in Sidney, Ohio (1913)

At first producing only cast-iron products, the company added nickel-plated ware in 1892. In 1894 Wagner was one of the first to make aluminum cookware. The company acquired their competitor Sidney Hollow Ware from Phillip Smith in 1897. A third brother, William H. Wagner, joined the company to run this operation. In 1903 Sidney Hollow Ware was sold back to Smith. By 1913 Wagner was distributing its products globally. The company said in its early advertisements:

We do not strive to manufacture hollow ware as cheaply as possible, but as good as it can be made. We cannot afford to put on the market ware that will not sustain our reputation. The name ‘Wagner’ is cast on the bottom of each piece of ware.

Wagner grew into a major manufacturer of cast iron and aluminum products, selling in the US and Europe. In addition to cookware it manufactured furnace grates, feed troughs, rubbish burners, kettles, and chemists' mortars. The company won many awards, and at one point had a 60% market share in cookware. Brand names included Wagner Ware, National, Long Life, Wardway and Ward's Cast Iron.

The "Magnalite" line of cast aluminum products was introduced in the early 1930s, made from a patented aluminum alloy. The company employed the industrial designer John Gordon Rideout to overhaul the design of Wagner's products in an effort to counter falling sales during the Great Depression. In 1933 Rideout and his partner Harold Van Doren designed a Magnalite teakettle with varying thickness to maximize heat conductivity, and in 1934 they designed an Magnalite aluminum covered casserole for Wagner.

Starting in 1946 the heirs of the founding Wagner brothers divested their holdings in the company. The Randall Company of Cincinnati, Ohio, a car parts manufacturer, bought the Wagner Manufacturing Company in 1952.

== Post-acquisition ==
In 1957 Randall's Wagner division acquired Griswold Manufacturing from McGraw-Edison. In 1959 Randall was itself acquired by Textron. Textron sold the Wagner and Griswold lines to General Housewares Corporation (GHC) in 1969. In 1996 GHC sold rights to the Wagner and Griswold lines to Slyman Group. After being allowed to fall into receivership, in 2000 the Wagner and Griswold trademarks were bought by the American Culinary Corporation of Willoughby, Ohio. The Wagner foundry was abandoned and left to decay. The US Environmental Protection Agency reported a complaint of environmental contamination at the former factory site in 2015. The foundry was finally torn down in June of 2023.

As of 2022, the brand was reintroduced to the market by Wagner Cast Iron with guidance from the Wagner family. The company produces reissues of vintage designs, beginning with the Long Griddle No. 1148.

== Sources ==
- Gantz, Carroll (2014-07-03). Founders of American Industrial Design. McFarland. ISBN 978-0-7864-7686-2.
- George, William (2003). Antique Electric Waffle Irons 1900-1960: A History of the Appliance Industry in 20th Century America. Trafford Publishing. ISBN 978-1-55395-632-7.
- "Home". American Culinary.
- Kinchin, Juliet; O'Connor, Aidan (2011). Counter Space: Design and the Modern Kitchen. The Museum of Modern Art. ISBN 978-0-87070-808-4.
- Pruess, Joanna (2009). Griswold and Wagner Ware Cast Iron Cookbook: Delicious and Simple Comfort Food. Skyhorse Publishing Inc. ISBN 978-1-60239-803-0.
- "Wagner Manufacturing Co". The Cast Iron Collector.
- Wallace, Rich (August 1995). "Altenbach's Architectural Legacy Still Lives on in Shelby County". Shelby County Historical Society.
- Wallace, Rich (January 1998). "Wagner Manufacturing Company". Shelby County Historical Society.
