= St. Louis Park High School =

Coordinates: 44.94360°N 93.36093°W

Location
- 6425 W 33rd Street; St. Louis Park, Minnesota 55426; United States

Information
- Type: Public
- Motto: Achieving Success One Student At a Time
- Established: 1898
- Principal: LaNisha Paddock
- Teaching staff: 68.32 (FTE)
- Enrollment: 1,423 (2023–2024)
- Student to teacher ratio: 20.83
- Colors: Orange and black
- Mascot: Oriole
- Website: hs.slpschools.org

St. Louis Park High School is a four-year public high school located in St. Louis Park, Minnesota, United States. St. Louis Park High School is ranked by Newsweek as #290 in their "List of the 1500 Top High Schools in America," #3 among Minnesota schools on the list in 2012. In 2001, the high school began participation in the International Baccalaureate program and has since been decreasing the number of Advanced Placement classes offered in the curriculum.

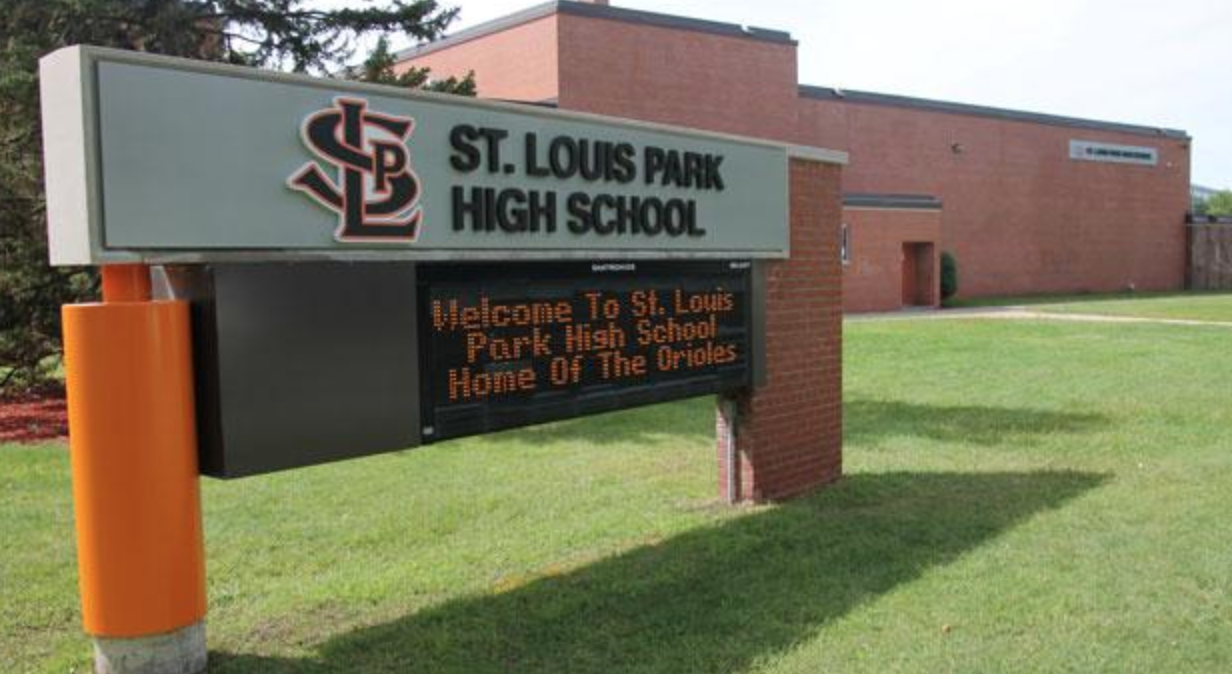
St. Louis Park High School

== Athletics ==
St. Louis Park High School is a member of the Metro West Conference in the Minnesota State High School League. In 2005, the school left the Classic Lake Conference due to its smaller student body compared to the schools and joined the North Suburban Conference. After the North Suburban Conference disbanded, the school then became a founding member of the Metro West Conference in 2014.

The school has created a website for information on current athletic events.

State championships
Season	Sport	Number of championships	Year
Fall	Cross country, boys	2	1955, 1961
Fall	Soccer, boys	3	1972, 1973, 1974
Winter	Nordic skiing, Boys	1	2003
Winter	Alpine skiing, Boys	1	1955
Winter	Basketball, Girls	2	1986, 1990
Winter	Basketball, Boys	1	1962
Spring	Golf, Boys	1	2003
Spring	Synchronized swimming, Girls	22	
Spring	Track and field, Boys	5	1958, 1962, 1963, 1965, 1966
Spring	Track and field, Girls	1	1998
Total		41	

== Other activities ==
=== Debate team ===
St. Louis Park High School has a Lincoln-Douglas debate program in the National Forensics League. Senior Catherine Tarsney won the 2010 Tournament of Champions.

=== The Echo newspaper ===
The Echo is St. Louis Park High Schools’ entirely student-run newspaper. The publication is recognized nationally by a variety of organizations including the National Scholastic Press Association and Columbia Scholastic Press Association. Echo has been in the NSPA Hall of Fame since 1988. While attending St. Louis Park, New York Times columnist Thomas Friedman wrote for, but never edited, The Echo, including one article in which he interviewed then Israeli Defense Minister Ariel Sharon.

In the spring of 2020, Echo was named an Online Pacemaker recipient by the National Scholastic Press Association (NSPA), making their website in the top 16 in the country. Echo also received the Online Pacemaker in 2019 and 2018 and was named a finalist in the small school category in 2017, 2016 and a finalist 2015. In terms of the print newspaper, Echo was named a Newspaper Pacemaker finalist in 2019. Echo had previously received the Newspaper Pacemaker in 2018, 2017, 2015, 2014, 2013 and 2011. In 2016 and 2007 Echo was named a finalist for the Newspaper Pacemaker.

In the High School Hybrid News category, Echo received a Silver Crown in 2020, 2019, 2018 and 2017 from the Columbia Scholastic Press Association. In 2016 and 2015 Echo received a Gold Crown in the High School Hybrid News category. In 2014 and 2013 Echo received gold in the High School category, and in 2012 Echo received a Silver Crown in the same category.

At the NSPA fall and spring conventions Echo has received various Best of Show awards over the years. In the spring of 2020 Echo placed fifth in both the print tabloid with 16 or fewer pages and the small school website categories. In the fall of 2019 Echo received tenth place in best of show for a tabloid with 16 or fewer pages and first place for the website in the small school category (less than 1,500 students). In the fall of 2018 Echo placed first in both the print tabloid with 16 or fewer pages and the small school website categories. At the convention in the spring of 2018 Echo placed third in the website competition and fifth in the print competition.

In the print tabloid with 16 or fewer pages category Echo placed fifth in the fall of 2017, first in the fall of 2015, seventh in the fall of 2014. In 2011, 2010, 2009 and 2004 Echo was in the print newspaper with 9-12 pages category. In the fall of 2011 Echo placed third, in the fall of 2010 Echo placed first, in fall of 2009 Echo placed second and in the fall of 2004 Echo placed in fourth. In 2003 Echo placed second in the print paper with 1-8 pages category. In the small-school website Best of Show competition Echo placed sixth in the fall of 2017, seventh in the spring of 2017, first in the spring of 2016 and first in the spring of 2015.

At the state level, Echo has received several Best of Shows at the fall convention. In 2020 Echo received first place in the website category. In 2019 Echo received first place for the website, second place for the print paper and fifth in the broadcast category. Echo received first in both the print newspaper and website categories in 2017. In 2016 Echo received first in the website category and fifth in the print category. In 2015 Echo received second in the print category and fourth in the website category.

== Notable alumni ==
- Bert Baston (class of 1912), College Football Hall of Fame inductee, World War I hero (Navy Cross for Extraordinary Valor)
- T. J. Bohn, former professional baseball player for the Seattle Mariners and Philadelphia Phillies
- Ethan Jesse Coen (class of 1976), film director, screenwriter, and producer, younger Coen Brother
- Joel Daniel Coen (class of 1973), film director, screenwriter, and producer, older Coen Brother
- Jeff Diamond, retired NFL executive for the Minnesota Vikings and Tennessee Titans
- Philip Dray, author, At the Hands of Persons Unknown: The Lynching of Black America, etc.
- Mike Feinstein, City Council member (1996–2004) and Mayor (2000–2002), Santa Monica, CA
- Peggy Flanagan, Lieutenant Governor of Minnesota
- Al Franken, U.S. Senator, political satirist, comedian; attended through 10th grade
- Thomas Friedman (class of 1971), New York Times columnist and bestselling author
- Pete Hautman, author
- Jerry Hertaus (class of 1970), Politician, Minnesota State Legislator-House of Representatives, Mayor, real estate entrepreneur-developer, builder, broker
- Peter Himmelman, musician and songwriter, formerly of Sussman Lawrence
- Sharon Isbin, classical guitarist and head of the Julliard guitar department
- Scott Litman, technology entrepreneur, founder of the MN Cup business plan competition
- Nadia Mohamed, Mayor of St. Louis Park, first Somali elected Mayor in United States history
- Peggy Orenstein, author and contributing writer for the New York Times Magazine
- Jim Petersen, pro basketball player in the NBA from 1985 to 1992, Minnesota Lynx Assistant Coach
- Erik Rasmussen, professional hockey player
- Bob Stein, former NFL player, former president and CEO of the Minnesota Timberwolves
- Marc Trestman, offensive coordinator of Baltimore Ravens, former head coach of the Chicago Bears
- J. Elvis Weinstein, played Dr. Laurence Erhardt and the original puppeteer/voice for Tom Servo on Mystery Science Theater 3000
- Alan Weisman (class of 1965), author
- Dan Wilson, lead singer of Trip Shakespeare and Semisonic
