= Old Main (Augsburg University) =

- New Main-Augsburg Seminary
- U.S. National Register of Historic Places
- Minneapolis Landmark
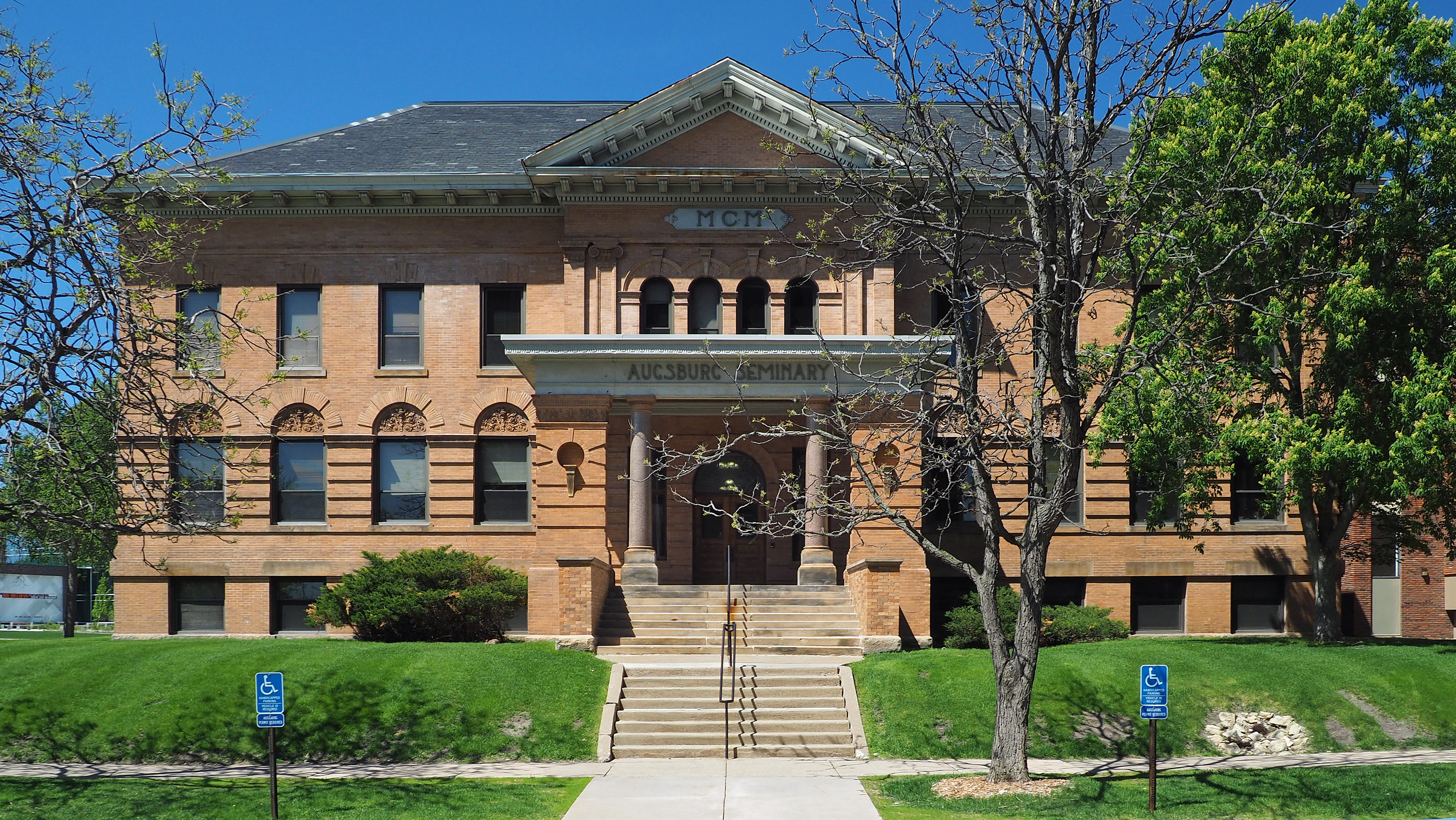
- Augsburg University's Old Main from the south

- Location within Minnesota Location within the United States
- Location: 731 21st Avenue S., Minneapolis, Minnesota
- Coordinates: 44°57′56.5″N 93°14′31″W
- Area: less than one acre
- Built: 1901
- Architect: Omeyer, Didrik A.; Thori, Martin P.
- Architectural style: Renaissance Revival
- NRHP reference No.: 83003653

Significant dates
- Added to NRHP: October 6, 1983
- Designated MPLSL: 1984

Old Main is a building on the campus of Augsburg University in Minneapolis, Minnesota, in the Cedar-Riverside neighborhood. It was built in 1901 at a cost of $35,000, designed by the St. Paul firm of Omeyer and Thori and built by Charles F. Haglin, who built other structures such as the Lumber Exchange Building and the Peavey–Haglin Experimental Concrete Grain Elevator. The building, originally known as "New Main", was listed on the National Register of Historic Places in 1983.

The building is large and symmetrical, evoking a classical architectural style. When it opened, it contained a chapel, gymnasium, classrooms, library and museum. It became the center of campus activity and a point of pride for the college. It has not been altered significantly from its original design. It retains its architectural integrity, as well as its historical and educational significance. A number of renovations in 1980 aimed to improve energy efficiency while preserving architectural details from the past.
