= Nordic Ware =

American cookware manufacturing company

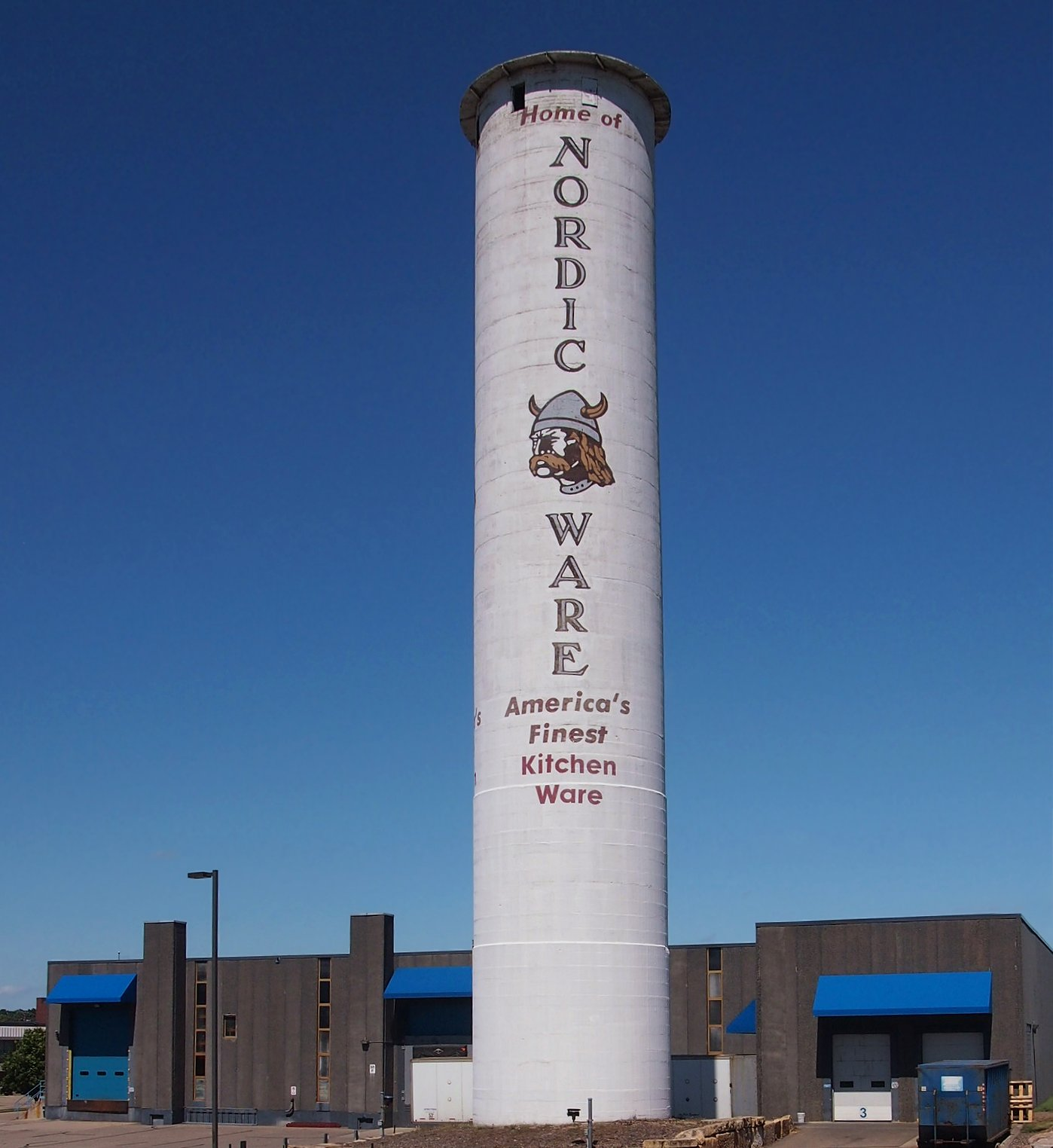
- Nordic Ware branding is on the Peavey–Haglin Experimental Concrete Grain Elevator
- Company type: Cookware and bakeware manufacturing
- Founded: 1946
- Founder: H. David Dalquist
- Headquarters: St. Louis Park, Minnesota, United States
- Website: www.nordicware.com

Northland Aluminum Products, Inc, doing business as Nordic Ware, is an American company based in St. Louis Park, Minnesota, notable for introducing the Bundt cake pan in the early 1950s.

It was founded in 1946 by Henry David Dalquist (25 May 1918 – 2 January 2005), who trademarked the name Bundt in 1950, his wife Dorothy, his brother Mark, and their friend Donald Nygren. Nordic Ware remains family-owned and operated, and David Dalquist (son of founders Henry David and Dorothy Dalquist) is the current company president.

In addition to the Bundt cake pan, Nordic Ware is also a pioneer in the field of microwave cookware. They introduced products such as the patented Micro-Go-Round, better known as the automated food rotator.

More than 70 million Bundt pans have been sold by Nordic Ware across North America. To mark the 60th anniversary of the pan the company designated 15 November as 'National Bundt Day'. The company also runs a competition every year, 'Bundts Across America', celebrating the best Bundt cake creations as well as holding cooking classes twice a week.

Nordic Ware is one of the few remaining American cookware companies that produce their products almost entirely in the United States and also offers their products in 50 countries. Only a few of their items are ineligible for international shipment.

== Location ==
At their headquarters and manufacturing plant in Saint Louis Park, the Nordic Ware branding is painted on the Peavey–Haglin Experimental Concrete Grain Elevator near the interchange of Minnesota State Highway 100 and Minnesota State Highway 7. The grain elevator was the first reinforced concrete circular grain elevator in the United States, and possibly in the world. Prior to Nordic Ware, the grain elevator carried the sign for 'Lumber Stores Inc' until Nordic Ware purchased the land as it expanded and invested $40,000 in a restoration project of it.
