= Wheels For Wishes =

US non-profit organization

- Formation: 2009; 17 years ago
- Founder: Bill Bigley; Randy Heiligman
- Legal status: 501(c)(3) organization
- Headquarters: St. Louis Park, Minnesota
- Website: https://wheelsforwishes.org/

The Car Donation Foundation, doing business as Wheels For Wishes, is a nonprofit car donation organization based in St. Louis Park, Minnesota. The organization donates its proceeds to charitable organizations including the Make-A-Wish Foundation, Vehicles For Veterans, and Animal Car Donation.

== Overview ==
Wheels for Wishes is the trade name of Car Donation Foundation, a 501(c)(3) nonprofit organization that financially supports charitable organizations through motor vehicle donations. It accepts donations of cars, boats, motorcycles, RVs and other vehicles. Proceeds from the sale of vehicles are donated to nonprofit organizations including the Make-A-Wish Foundation, Vehicles For Veterans, which benefits veterans living with disabilities and homeless veterans, and Animal Car Donation, which benefits animal rescues.

== History ==
Wheels For Wishes was founded in 2009 by Bill Bigley and Randy Heiligman. It is headquartered in St. Louis Park, Minnesota. As of 2015, it was the largest auto donation charity in the United States.

A 2014 report published by the Office of the Minnesota Attorney General found that 20% of the organization's proceeds were donated to its partner Make-A-Wish chapters and 30% was spent on advertising. After the initial report, the organization was criticized for misleading advertising, and the Minnesota and Connecticut chapters of Make-a-Wish Foundation ended their relationship with Wheels for Wishes. They subsequently renewed their contracts with Wheels For Wishes. A 2017 article in The Orange County Register reported that 51% of proceeds went to charity. The remaining proceeds are spent on administrative costs including advertising, towing, and auction house fees.

As of 2024, it had donated $114 million to Make-A-Wish, accounting for 13,672 wishes.

In 2024, the organization partnered with the rock band Green Day to raise money through a sweepstakes that awarded the 1968 Mercury Monterey convertible featured in the music videos for "Boulevard of Broken Dreams" and "Holiday".
