= Shoppes at Knollwood =

- Location: St. Louis Park, Minnesota
- Coordinates: 44°56′09″N 93°23′03″W
- Opened: 1955; 71 years ago
- Manager: Mid-America Real Estate
- Owner: Gateway Knollwood, LLC
- Num. of stores: 45
- Num. of anchor tenants: 2
- Floor area: 460,000 square feet (42,735.4 m^{2})
- Floors: 1 w/partial basement
- Parking: 3,500
- Public transit: Metro Transit
- Website: www.shoppesatknollwood.com

The Shoppes at Knollwood, previously known as Knollwood Mall, is a regional shopping mall located along Minnesota State Highway 7 in St. Louis Park, Minnesota owned by Gateway Knollwood, LLC and managed by Mid-America Real Estate. Major stores at the mall include Kohl's, TJ Maxx, Old Navy, Nordstrom Rack, and DSW Shoe Warehouse.

== History ==
Knollwood Mall opened in 1955 as an open-air strip mall called Knollwood Plaza. It featured a Powers Dry Goods store, Woolworth, JCPenney, and Red Owl Grocery Store. The center was enclosed in 1980 and Montgomery Ward added to the eastern side.

Powers became Donaldson's and then Carson Pirie Scott. In 1994, the Carson's store closed and was torn down for a Kohl's. Montgomery Ward closed its store in the mall in 1998, and one year later, Cub Foods opened in its place.

The eastern wing of the mall was vacated in 1999 for a movie theater multiplex which never opened. Five years later, TJ Maxx relocated from an existing store within the mall to the east wing, opening a combination TJ Maxx/HomeGoods store in its place. JCPenney closed in 2000.

In 2014, plans were announced to remove the remaining portion of enclosed mall between Kohl's and TJ Maxx/HomeGoods. The center added a Nordstrom Rack store and renamed itself the "Shoppes at Knollwood" for its May 2015 grand re-opening.

In March, 2025, it was announced that Kohl's would be closing, and the mall itself was for sale.
