= Car donation =

Practice of giving used automobiles to charity

Car donation is the practice of giving away unwanted used automobiles or other vehicles to charitable organizations. In the United States, these donations can provide a tax benefit to the donor.

== In the United States ==
=== Tax considerations ===
Donors need to fulfil certain post-donation requirements to qualify for the tax deduction, such as obtaining a written acknowledgment of the car's subsequent sale by the charity, and itemizing tax returns instead of taking the standard deduction.

For vehicles valued at less than $500, the deduction amount comes from the donor's own estimate of the car's value, even if the charity receives less money from its sale. Deductions greater than $500 are limited to the proceeds of selling the vehicle, usually at auction. The U.S Internal Revenue Service advises that starting in 2005:

The rules for determining the amount that a donor may deduct for a charitable contribution of a qualified vehicle, including an automobile, with a claimed value of more than $500 changed at the beginning of 2005 as a result of the American Jobs Creation Act of 2004. In general, that Act limits a donor's deduction to the amount of the gross proceeds from the charity's sale of the vehicle.

For vehicles valued at over $500, taxpayers are required to attach the charity's written acknowledgment to their tax return.

== In the United Kingdom ==
Car donation schemes in the UK are slightly different from those operating in the United States and only established themselves as a valued source of income for UK charities in January 2010, led by GiveACar – a non-profit organization. Operating as a non-profit organization allows charities to avoid the large overheads created by profit-making car donation companies. In addition, whereas car donation in the US has been incentivized through tax breaks, in the UK there are no such tax benefits to donating your car.

== Practices ==
Vehicle donations in America are operated in a wide variety of plans, ranging from highly organized and professional-grade not-for-profit, national, or local charities to scrap yards, haulers, tow-truck companies and salvagers who establish programs that may support a charity. According to Charity Navigator, the guidance of the rating agencies concerning car donation programs, where the charity receives a flat fee for the use of their name by a third party, versus program management by a third party, there are some questionable companies who contract to use a nonprofit's agencies name and logo to raise funds and then just give them a flat fee unrelated to income or performance. This is frowned upon by rating agencies and the government. However, a percentage return program is viewed positively if the nonprofit receives more than 50% of the generated income.

== See also ==
- Pete Palmer Jr.
- Kars4Kids
- Wheels For Wishes
- Car Donation Foundation
