= Peavey–Haglin Experimental Concrete Grain Elevator =

- U.S. National Register of Historic Places
- U.S. National Historic Landmark
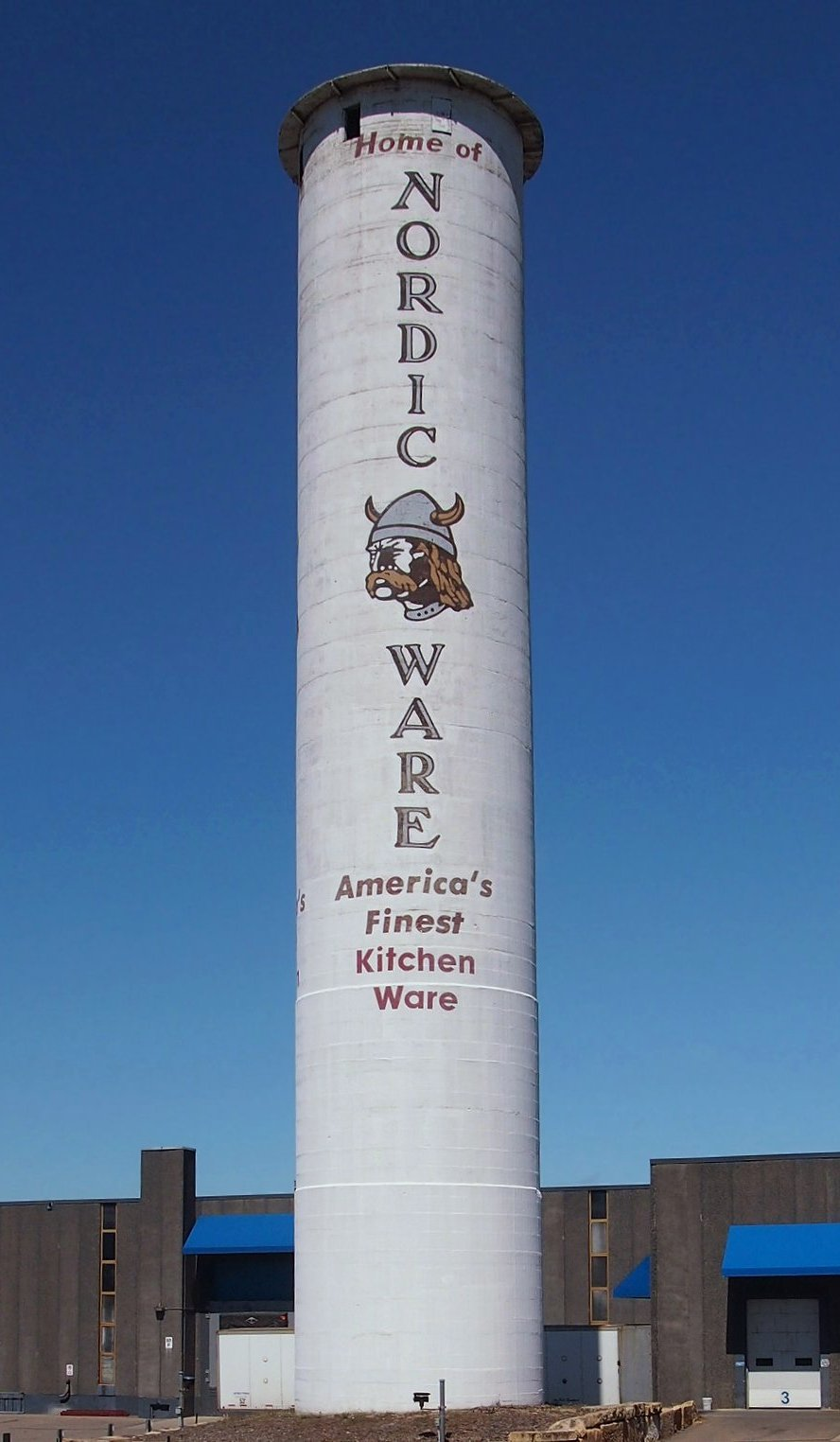
- The Peavey–Haglin Experimental Concrete Grain Elevator from the southwest, now advertising Nordic Ware

- Location within Minnesota Location within the United States
- Location: 5005 County Road 25, St. Louis Park, Minnesota
- Coordinates: 44°56′32.6″N 93°20′42.7″W
- Area: Less than one acre
- Built: 1899–1900
- Architect: Charles F. Haglin
- NRHP reference No.: 78001547

Significant dates
- Added to NRHP: December 19, 1978
- Designated NHL: December 21, 1981

The Peavey–Haglin Experimental Concrete Grain Elevator is the world's first known cylindrical concrete grain elevator. It was built from 1899 to 1900 in St. Louis Park, Minnesota, United States, as an experiment to prove the design was viable. It was an improvement on wooden elevators that were continually at risk of catching fire or even exploding. Its cylindrical concrete design became the industry standard in the United States, revolutionizing grain storage practices. After its initial experiments, the Peavey–Haglin Elevator was never again used to store grain. Since the late 1960s it has been maintained on the grounds of the Nordic Ware company and is painted with their name and logo.

The Peavey–Haglin Elevator was listed on the National Register of Historic Places in 1978, proclaimed a National Historic Landmark in 1981, and a National Historic Civil Engineering Landmark in 1983.

== Background ==
Frank Peavey (1850–1901) was a native of Maine who moved to the Midwest as a young man and became a grain merchant. His business was buying grain from farmers and storing it in elevators before delivering it to flour mills. Basing himself in Minneapolis in 1881, he became known as the "Elevator King", owning elevators across Minnesota and Iowa and expanding into the Dakotas. However the wooden elevators of the day were quite vulnerable to fire, as they were built of flammable material, filled with volatile grain dust, and usually stood next to railroad tracks with their spark-spewing locomotives. Numerous elevator fires were causing insurance rates to skyrocket.

Peavey was convinced that new construction methods could produce a large, fireproof grain elevator. He hired Charles F. Haglin (1849–1921), a local civil engineer, to work on the problem with him. They quickly recognized the promise of reinforced concrete, a recent innovation popularized in the 1880s.

== Initial construction ==
Even though other engineers argued that their design would explode when filled or crack when emptied, Peavey and Haglin proceeded with their plan for a cylindrical concrete structure. Construction began in the summer of 1899. Skeptics dubbed it "Peavey's Folly". Haglin built a section of round formwork braced with steel hoops. Concrete was poured in and given time to harden, at which point the framework was removed and reassembled above to produce the next section. In this manner the elevator was built up to a height of 68 feet (21 m). The interior diameter was 20 feet (6.1 m), while the walls tapered from 12 inches (30 cm) thick at the base to 8 inches (20 cm) at the top. By fall the elevator was ready, and Peavey had it filled with grain. The form held and the grain was left to see how it would fare over the winter.

== European tour ==
While they waited, Peavey dispatched Haglin to Europe to investigate reports of reinforced concrete elevators there. Haglin was accompanied by his young son Eddie and Peavey's son-in-law Frank Heffelfinger. From January to March 1900 they toured grain facilities and met with experts in London, Hamburg, Braunschweig, Copenhagen, Budapest, Brăila, Galați, Bucharest, Vienna, and Paris. They found some elevators of concrete, but all were rectangular or hexagonal, and most were atop steel or wood bins. Others were built of brick or mortared stone.

Upon his return to Minneapolis, Haglin reported that their European counterparts were no more advanced on the issue than Americans.

== Success and legacy ==
In spring 1900 it was time to empty the experimental elevator. A crowd gathered, but kept their distance, still expecting some kind of catastrophe. Haglin had faith in his structure, however, and stood right at its foot to pull the lever and allow the grain to pour out into an adjacent pit. The elevator stayed perfectly intact and the crowd began cheering.

Haglin went on to increase the height of the elevator to 125 feet (38 m) for a few further experiments. After those proved successful as well, the elevator prototype never held grain again. Peavey immediately commissioned Haglin to build a grain elevator complex in Duluth. Widely publicized, Peavey and Haglin's cylindrical concrete design was quickly adopted throughout the American Midwest. While traditional wooden elevators, usually clad with metal siding, remained common for storage near farms, the new design sprang up at shipping centers, revolutionizing the grain storage industry. Grain elevators, usually the tallest structure on the flat Midwestern landscape, became a symbol of productive agriculture.

== Later history ==
Frank Peavey didn't live to see his project revolutionize the industry; he died unexpectedly of pneumonia on December 30, 1901.

The experimental grain elevator stood unused as various industries came and went around it. In the 1950s the property was owned by Lumber Stores, Inc. and the elevator was painted with their name. Nordic Ware, a cookware company best known for introducing the Bundt cake pan, was founded nearby in 1946 and ultimately purchased the land with the elevator as they expanded their business. In 1969 Nordic Ware discovered that the elevator was deteriorating and in danger of collapsing. Cognizant of the structure's history, the company invested $40,000 in a restoration project. Around this time the elevator was painted with the Nordic Ware advertisement it still bears.

The Peavey–Haglin Experimental Concrete Grain Elevator now stands near the busy interchange of State Highways 7 and 100. It overlooks the Nordic Ware factory complex, the Cedar Lake Trail, and Lilac Park.

== See also ==
- List of grain elevators
- List of National Historic Landmarks in Minnesota
- National Register of Historic Places listings in Hennepin County, Minnesota
