= Gugelhupf =

German sweet bread

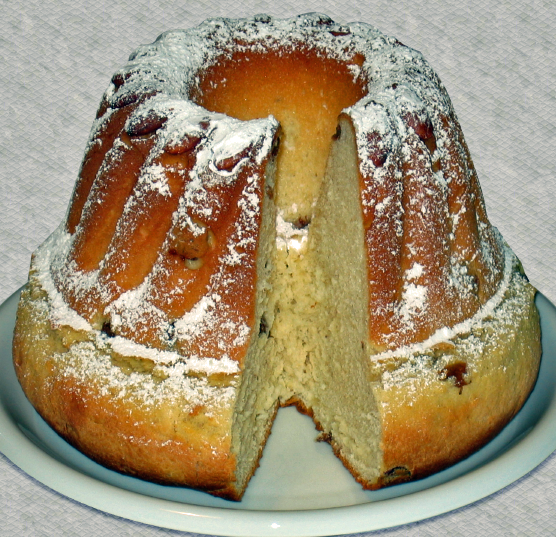
- Alternative names: Gugelhopf, Guglhupf, Kugelhopf, bábovka, tulband (-cake)
- Type: Sweet bread
- Place of origin: France, Germany, Austria, Switzerland
- Region or state: Western Europe and Central Europe
- Main ingredients: flour, baker's yeast with raisins, almonds and rosewater

A Gugelhupf (also Kugelhupf, Guglhupf, Gugelhopf, pronounced [ˈɡuːɡl̩.hʊp͡f, -hɔp͡f, ˈkuːɡl̩-], in Czech bábovka [ˈbaːbofka], and, in France, kouglof [kuɡlɔf], kouglouf, kougelhof, or kougelhopf, in the Netherlands tulband, short for tulbandcake) is a cake traditionally baked in a distinctive ring mould, similar to Bundt cake, but leavened with baker's yeast.

There are three main types: cocoa; plain with a hint of vanilla and lemon zest; and a marbled combination of the two. It is especially popular as a traditional cake in Central Europe. In the cuisine of the Pennsylvania Dutch it is known as Deitscher Kuche (German cake).

In late Medieval Austria, a Gugelhupf was served at major community events such as weddings, and was decorated with flowers, leaves, candles, and seasonal fruits. The name persisted through the Austro-Hungarian Empire, eventually becoming standardized in Viennese cookbooks as a refined, rich cake, flavored with rosewater and almond. Many regional variations exist, testifying to the widespread popularity of the Gugelhupf tradition.

The Gugelhupf was the sweet chosen to represent Austria in the Café Europe initiative of the Austrian presidency of the European Union, on Europe Day 2006.

== Etymology ==
The word's origin is disputed.

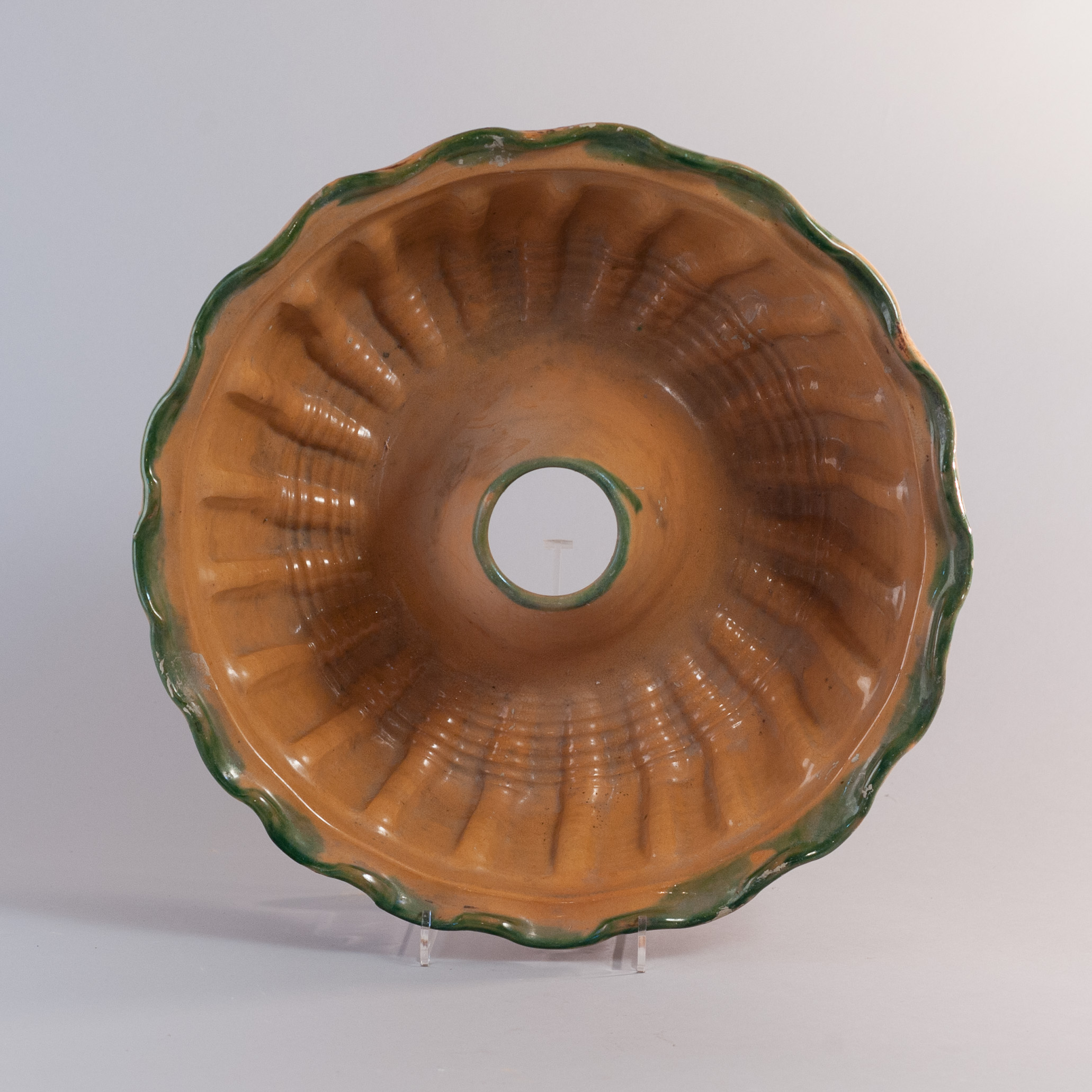
Glazed earthenware gugelhupf mould made in Rače-Fram around 1900

The old, South German name combines the Middle High German words Gugel (see also gugel, a long-pointed hood) derived from Latin cucullus, meaning hood or bonnet, and Hupf, which literally means "to hop" or "to jump". The Brothers Grimm wrote that the hupf may be a reference to the "jumping" of the dough caused by the yeast, but no firm etymological evidence exists for this. The earliest known Gugelhupf recipe, in Marx Rumpolt's 1581 cookbook, describes a "Hat Cake" with the distinctive shape and ornamentation recommendation, suggesting a similarity or intentional imitation of the shape of a medieval hat.

It is spelled kuglóf in Hungarian, kuglof (Cyrillic: куглоф) in Serbo-Croatian and Macedonian, Kugelhopf in Alsatian, kouglof in French and guguluf in Romanian. In Western Slovenia, it is also known as kuglof, and in Central and Eastern Slovenia, kugluh.

In Upper Austria, it is known as Wacker or Wacka. It is called bábovka in Czech and Slovak, and babka in Polish. In Slovenia, the standard word is šarkelj.

== Description ==
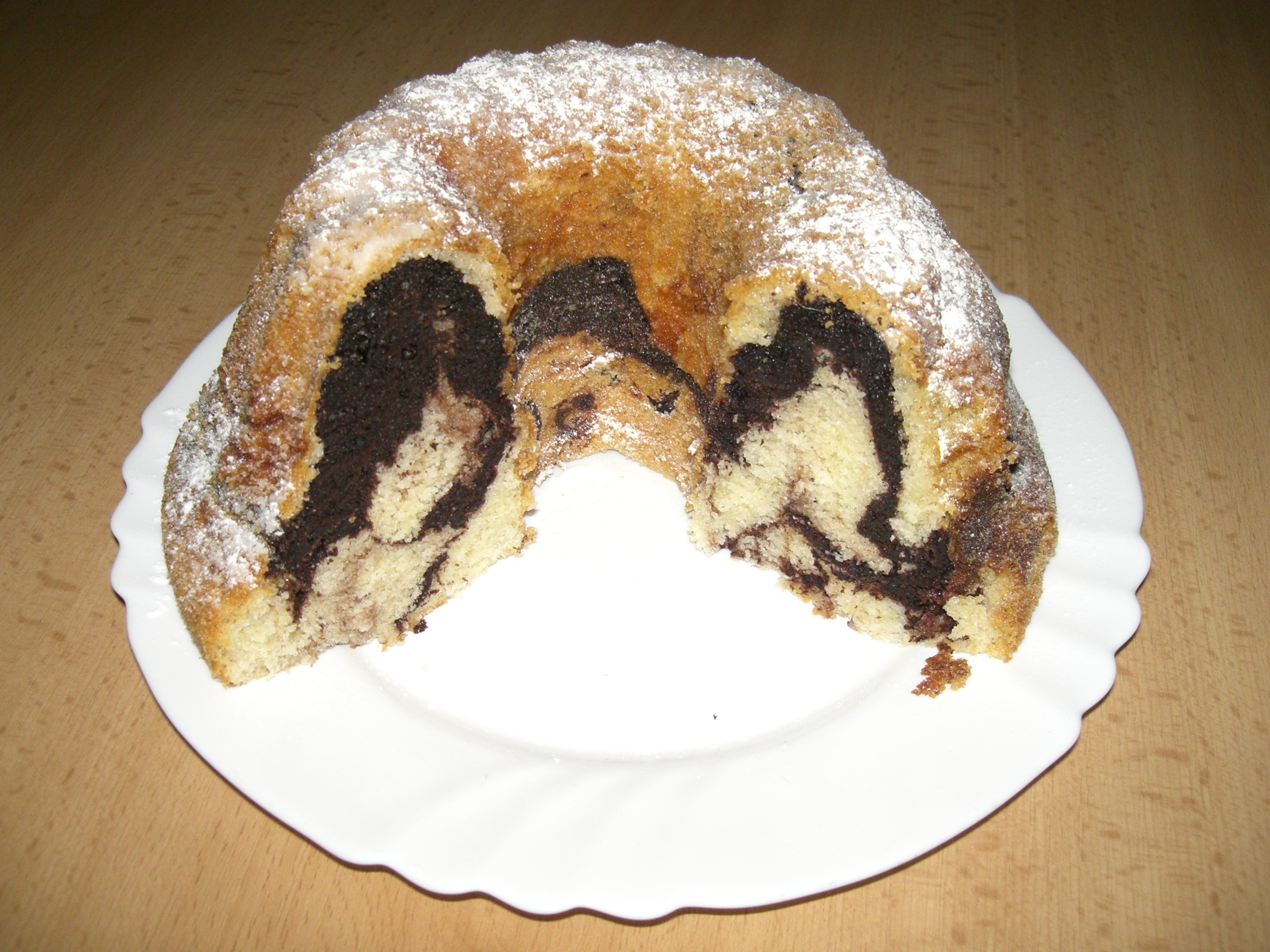
A two-coloured Czech version called "bábovka"

Gugelhupf is made with a soft yeast dough, baked in a high, creased, toroidal mould. Depending on the region, it can contain raisins, almonds or sometimes also Kirschwasser cherry brandy. Traditional Gugelhupf always contains some dried fruit, usually raisins, and sometimes other dried fruits, like sour cherries, can be soaked in orange juice or liquor. Some regional varieties (Czech, Hungarian and Slovak) are filled with a layer of sweetened ground poppy seeds or chocolate filling similar to Jewish babka.

It is not closely related to the Christmas cake in Italy known as the pandoro nor to the American Bundt cake as that is not yeast based. Sometimes a regular pound cake or a marble cake made without yeast but baked in a Gugelhupf mould is also called Gugelhupf.

== See also ==
- List of almond dishes
- Coffee cake
- Nut roll
- Savarin
- Brioche
