= Car Donation Foundation =

Nonprofit organization based in Minnesota

- Formation: 2009; 17 years ago
- Founder: Bill Bigley; Randy Heiligman
- Type: 501(c)(3) organization
- Purpose: Car donation
- Headquarters: St. Louis Park, Minnesota
- Executive director: Loren Dorshow
- Subsidiaries: Wheels For Wishes; Vehicles for Veterans; Animal Car Donation
- Website: https://cardonationfoundation.org/

The Car Donation Foundation is a nonprofit car donation organization based in St. Louis Park, Minnesota. It is the largest car donation organization in the United States, and operates Wheels For Wishes, Veterans for Vehicles, and Animal Car Donation.

== History ==
The foundation was established in 2009 by Bill Bigley and Randy Heiligman. The executive director of the foundation is Loren Dorshow. The foundation operates several car donation programs throughout the United States, doing business as Wheels For Wishes, Vehicles for Veterans, and Animal Car Donation.

Wheels for Wishes partners with chapters of the Make-A-Wish Foundation. Vehicles for Veterans benefits military veterans living with disabilities and unhoused veterans, donating proceeds to organizations like the Gary Sinise Foundation, and Semper Fi & America's Fund. Animal Car Donation benefits animal rescues that provide veterinary care, adoption services, and shelter.

It is the largest car donation organization in the United States. As of 2025, the organization had donated over $175 million to nonprofit organizations.
