= T. J. Bohn =

American baseball player

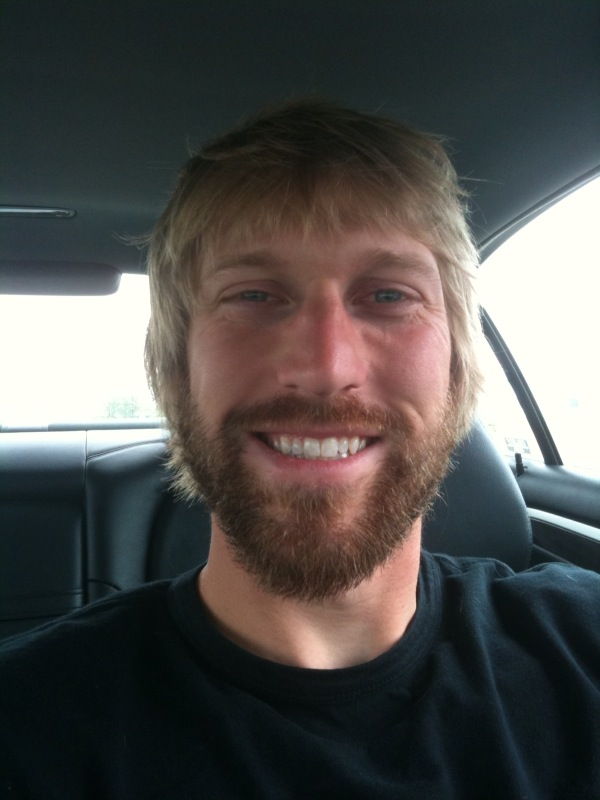
- Outfielder
- Born: January 17, 1980 (age 46); St. Louis Park, Minnesota, U.S.
- Batted: Right Threw: Right

MLB debut
- August 22, 2006, for the Seattle Mariners

Last MLB appearance
- June 1, 2008, for the Philadelphia Phillies

MLB statistics
- Batting average: .211
- Home runs: 1
- Runs batted in: 5
- Stats at Baseball Reference

Teams
- Seattle Mariners (2006); Philadelphia Phillies (2008)

Thomas Joseph Bohn (born January 17, 1980), is an American former professional baseball outfielder, who played in Major League Baseball (MLB) for the Seattle Mariners and Philadelphia Phillies. He made his MLB debut as a late-inning pinch hitter on August 22, 2006.

== Career ==
Bohn is a 1998 graduate of St. Louis Park High School. He graduated from Bellevue University in 2002. Bohn was drafted by the Mariners in the 30th round (910th overall) of the 2002 Major League Baseball draft.

In 2007, Bohn played for the Minor League Baseball (MiLB) Triple-A Richmond Braves, of the International League (IL). He was designated for assignment by the parent-club Atlanta Braves on September 16, 2007, and was picked up by the Phillies, eight days later.

Bohn played most of the 2008 season for the Phillies' Triple-A affiliate, the IL Lehigh Valley IronPigs, receiving only two short call-ups to the big league club. He became a free agent, at the end of that season.

After sitting out all of 2009, Bohn began 2010 Spring Training with the Chicago White Sox, but ended up playing for the Sioux City Explorers of the Independent League, for two seasons.

Bohn then retired as a player, and lives in Minnesota with his wife. He now serves as the hitting coach for the Macalester College baseball team.
