= Charles F. Haglin =

American architect

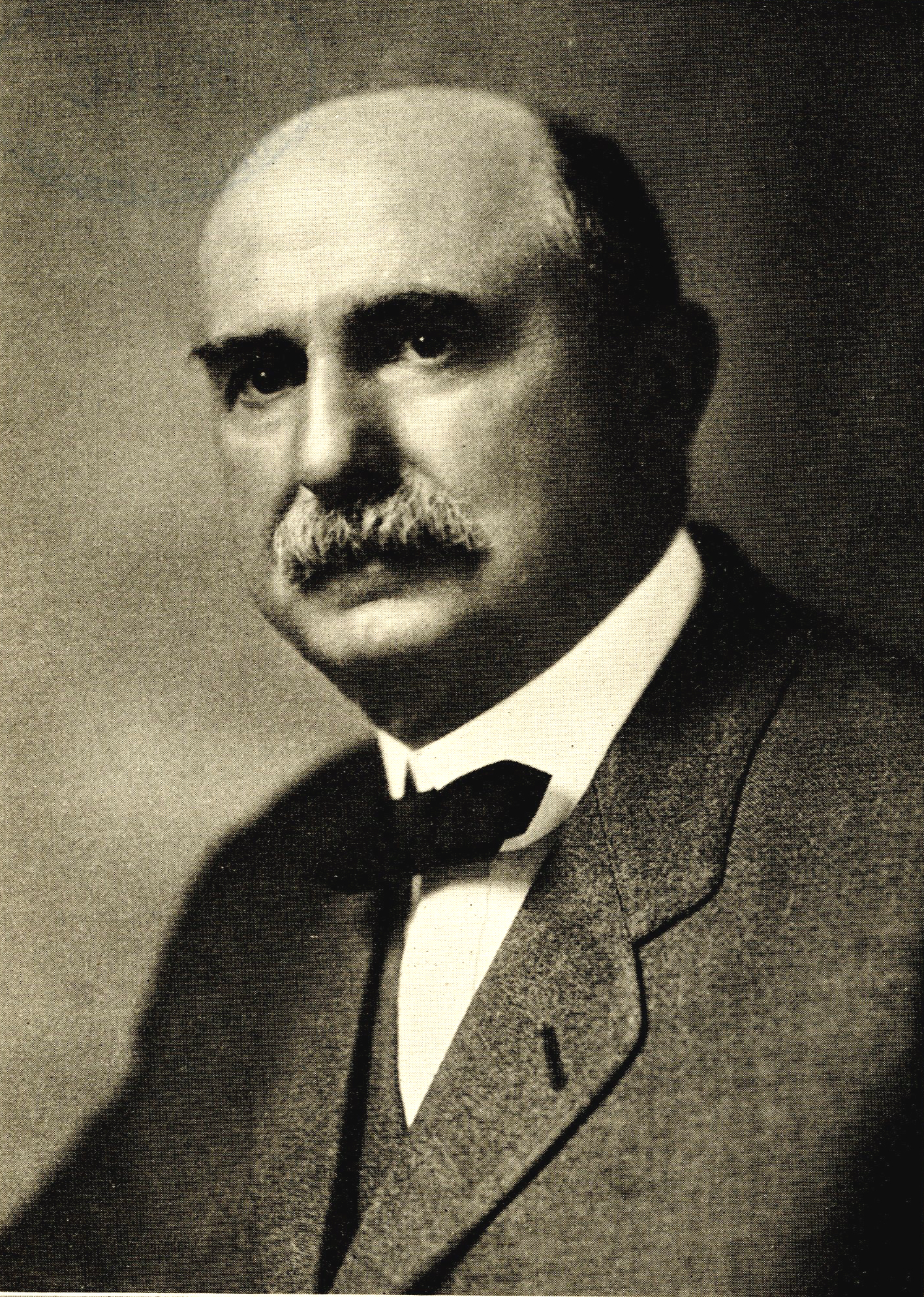
Portrait of Charles F. Haglin circa 1910

Charles F. Haglin (April 7, 1849 – February 23, 1921) was an architect, engineer, and contractor notable for his work in the U.S. state of Minnesota.

== Life and career ==
Haglin was born in Hastings, New York to a farming family. He attended local schools before finding work as a draftsman with a Syracuse, New York architect. He spent several more years working in Chicago, Illinois before moving to Minneapolis in 1873. He formed a partnership with Franklin B. Long for three years, doing business as Long & Haglin. After parting ways, Haglin briefly partnered with Charles Morse before embarking on a solo career. In 1909, he partnered again with B. H. Stahr. In 1920, he formed a company with his sons Charles Jr., Edward, and Preston called C. F. Haglin & Sons. Among the buildings Haglin was involved in are Minneapolis City Hall (1888-1909), the Peavey–Haglin Experimental Concrete Grain Elevator (1899–1900), Rand Tower (1929), and Old Main at Augsburg University (1901). Haglin died in Long Beach, California in 1921.
