= H. David Dalquist =

American inventor and chemical engineer

- Born: May 25, 1918; Minneapolis, Minnesota
- Died: January 2, 2005 (aged 86); Edina, Minnesota
- Occupation(s): Inventor, chemical engineer
- Spouse: Dorothy Margerite Staugaard Dalquist
- Children: David Dalquist; Corrine Lynch; Linda Jeffrey; Susan Brust

H. David Dalquist (May 25, 1918 – January 2, 2005) was an American inventor and chemical engineer.

Dalquist was a graduate of the University of Minnesota. Dalquist served as a radar technician in the Pacific with the United States Navy during World War II. In 1948, Dalquist and his wife, Dorothy, purchased Northland Aluminum Products and began manufacturing bake ware under the Nordic Ware name. Initially Nordic Ware's product line were all designed to make Scandinavian specialty items, including Rosette, Krumkake, Platte Panne and Ebelskiver.

In the early 1950s, Dalquist designed the Bundt cake pan. Bundt cakes became very popular after the Tunnel of Fudge cake recipe took second place at the 1966 Pillsbury Bake-Off. Dalquist subsequently licensed the name to Pillsbury for use in their cake mixes. He later helped develop thermoset plastics used in microwave cookware.
