= Bundt cake =

Donut-shaped cake

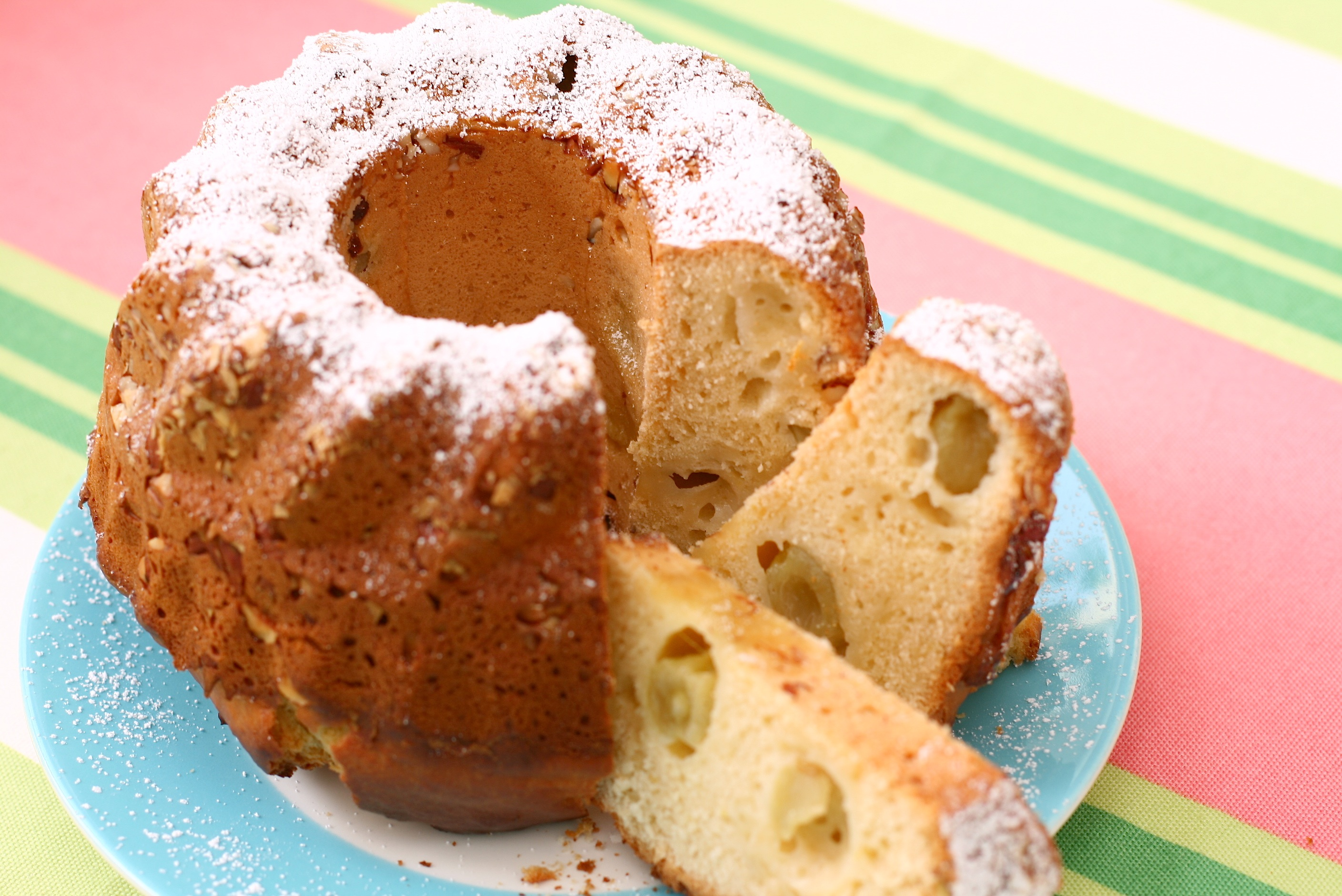
- A partially sliced Bundt cake
- Type: Cake
- Course: Dessert
- Place of origin: United States
- Region or state: Minneapolis
- Created by: H. David Dalquist
- Main ingredients: Flour, sugar, eggs

A Bundt cake is a cake that is baked in a Bundt pan, shaping it into a distinctive donut shape. The shape is inspired by a traditional European cake known as Gugelhupf, but Bundt cakes are not generally associated with any single recipe. The style of mold in North America was popularized in the 1950s and 1960s, after cookware manufacturer Nordic Ware trademarked the name "Bundt" and began producing Bundt pans from cast aluminum. Publicity from Pillsbury and General Foods saw the cakes gain widespread popularity.

== Etymology ==
The Bundt cake derives in part from a European brioche-like cake called Gugelhupf. In the Rhineland and Palatinate regions of Germany, Gugelhupf is traditionally known as Bundkuchen (German pronunciation: [ˈbʊntkuːxn̩]), a name formed by joining the two words Bund and Kuchen (cake).

Opinions differ as to the significance of the word Bund. One possibility is that it means "bunch" or "bundle", and refers to the way the batter is bundled around the tubed center of the pan. Another source suggests that it describes the banded appearance given to the cake by the fluted sides of the pan, similar to a tied sheaf or bundle of wheat. Some authors have suggested that Bund instead refers to a group of people, and that Bundkuchen is so called because of its suitability for parties and gatherings.

== History ==
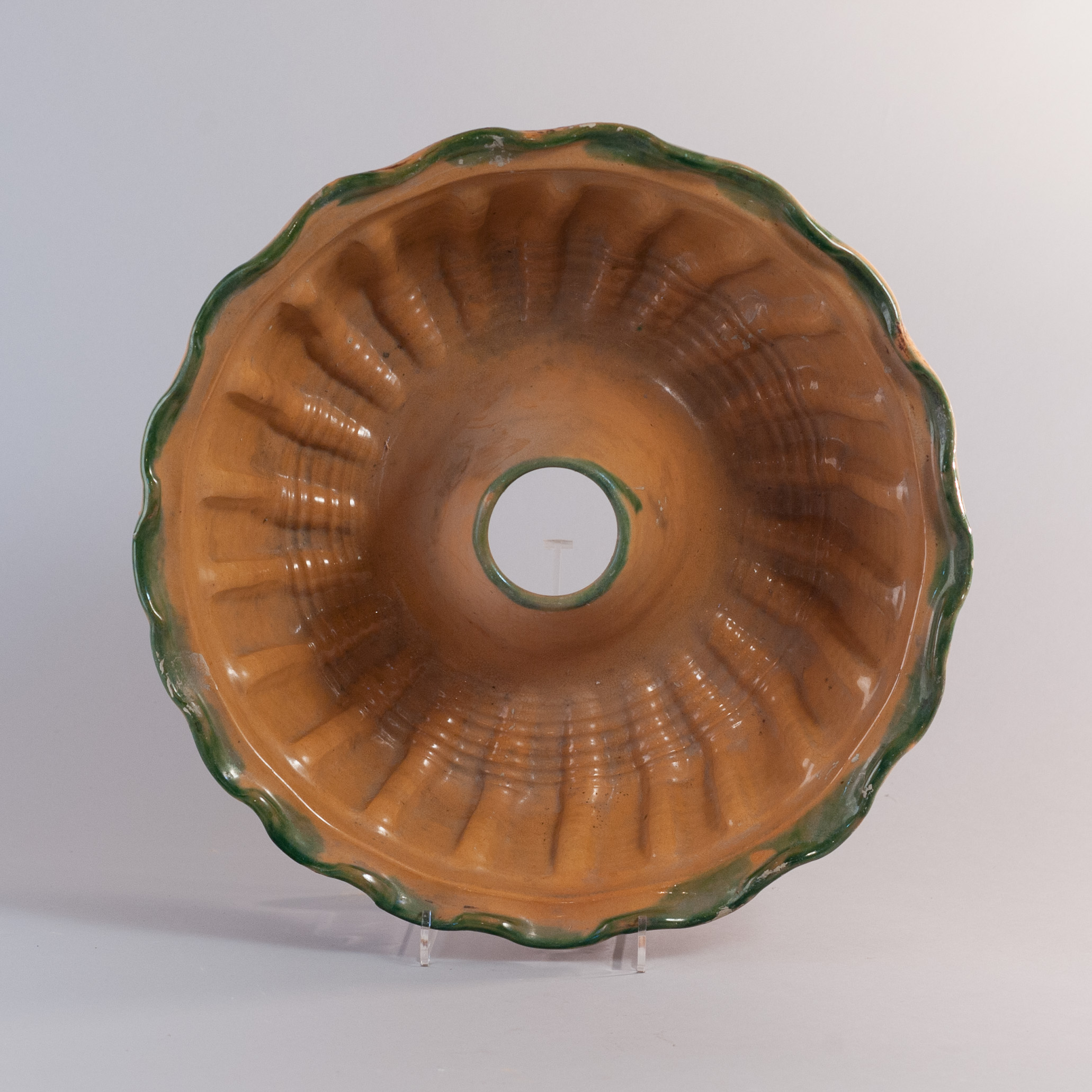
Early 20th century gugelhupf cake pan made of earthware pottery with lead glaze

The term bundt cake describes the style of bakeware more than a specific recipe. Bundt cakes do not conform to any single recipe; instead, their characterizing feature is their shape. While the term once referred to trademarked bakeware, today it has become a common term to describe any cake with the characteristic shape. The early bundt-style pans were heavy and difficult to work with, and there were no modern non-stick coatings in those days, so Jewish-American women requested the development of speciality bakeware for this style of cake. An engineer and chemist from Minneapolis, Minnesota, came up with the modern cast aluminum non-stick pans which became very popular in the 1960s and 1970s. The trademark from 1951 was made generic in 1985.

== Historical cookbooks ==
The oldest surviving Jewish-American cookbook, Aunt Babette's Cookbook, written by Bertha E. Kraemer, and published in Cincinnati, Ohio, in 1889, includes a recipe for a cake made with enriched yeast batter called "Plain bund or Napfkuchen".

== Design ==
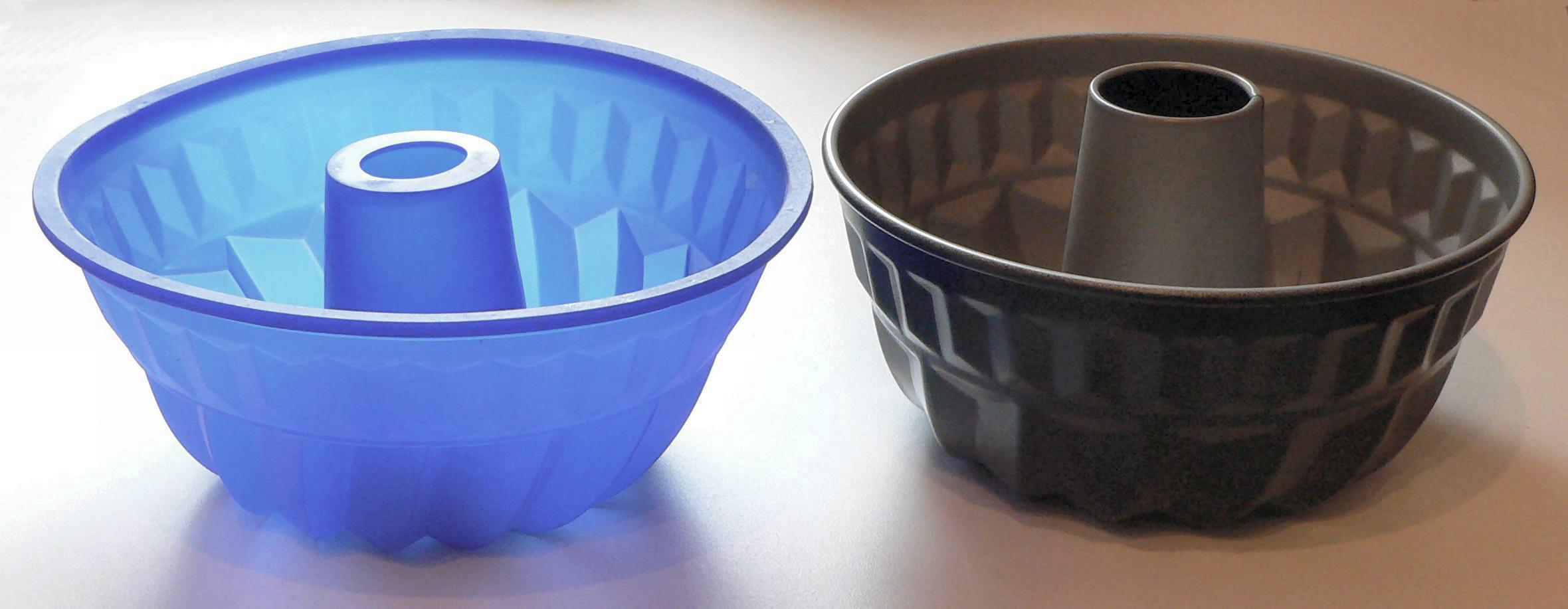
Bundt-style pans in silicone and metal

A Bundt pan generally has fluted or grooved sides, and is usually coated to make releasing the cake easier. Like other tube or ring style pans, the central tube allows faster and more even heat distribution when baking large volumes of batter.

Ring pans, like Bundt molds, heat faster than regular round pans, and they bake deep cakes evenly even at diameters over 9 inches. Usually heating cores are recommended for even heat distribution in deep cake tins and standard cakes larger than 9 inches in diameter. To bake in standard sized tins, Bundt recipes need conversion. A standard 9-inch cake pan holds around six cups volume, so a 12-cup Bundt recipe will fill two standard cake pans, or one 13×9 sheet pan.

Gugelhupf molds also have fluted sides, while other ring shaped molds, like tube pans and savarin, have straight sides to make releasing delicate fine crumb cakes, like angel food cake, easier. Since the name "Bundt" is a trademark, similar pans are often sold as "fluted tube pans" or given other similar descriptive titles. The trademark holder Nordic Ware produces Bundt pans only in aluminum, but similar fluted pans are available in other materials.

Despite the similar shape, a Gugelhupf differs from contemporary Bundt-style cakes in that it follows a particular yeast-based recipe, with fruit and nuts, and is often deeper in shape and more decorative. Other yeasted, brioche-like cakes, like babka and monkey bread, can be baked in Bundt molds. Bundt pans are also used to bake modernized cake batters and boxed mixes with baking powder, and can be used to mold gelatin salad, ice cream and even savory molded dishes, like meatloaf.

== Rise to popularity ==
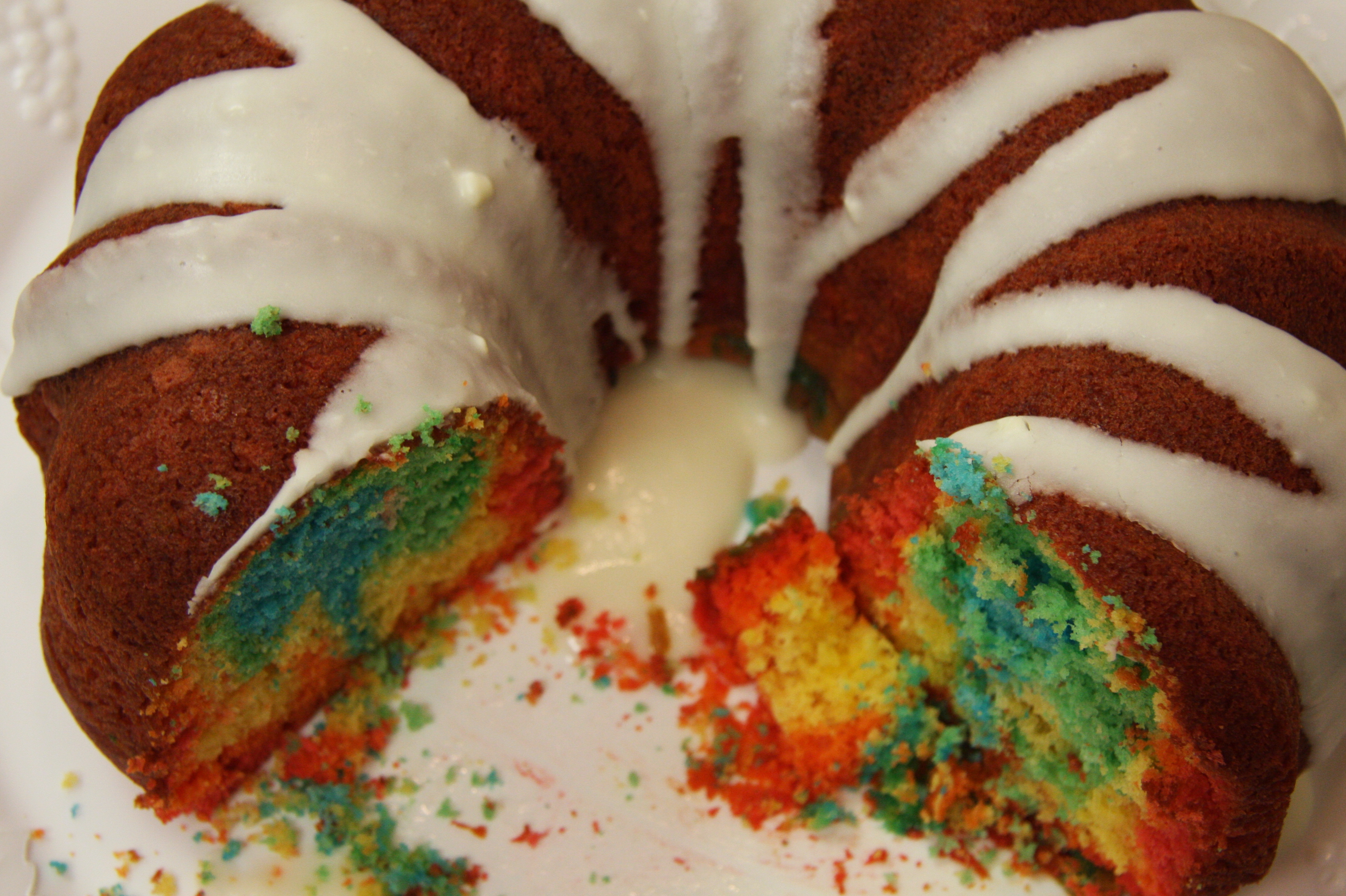
Rainbow Bundt cake, partially sliced

The people credited with popularizing the Bundt cake are American businessman H. David Dalquist and his brother Mark S. Dalquist, who co-founded cookware company Nordic Ware based in St. Louis Park, Minnesota. In the late 1940s, Rose Joshua and Fannie Schanfield, friends and members of the Minneapolis Jewish-American Hadassah Society approached Dalquist, asking if he could produce a modern version of a traditional cast iron Gugelhupf dish. Dalquist and company engineer Don Nygren designed a cast aluminum version which Nordic Ware then made a small production run of in 1950. In order to successfully trademark the pans, a "t" was added to the word "Bund". A number of the original Bundt pans now reside in the Smithsonian collection.

Initially, the Bundt pan sold so poorly that Nordic Ware considered discontinuing it. The product received a boost when it was mentioned in the New Good Housekeeping Cookbook in 1963, but did not gain real popularity until 1966, when a Bundt cake called the "Tunnel of Fudge", baked by Ella Helfrich, took second place at the annual Pillsbury Bake-Off and won its baker $5,000 ($49,615 in 2025 dollars). The resulting publicity resulted in more than 200,000 requests to Pillsbury for Bundt pans and soon led to the Bundt pan surpassing the tin Jell-O mold as the most-sold pan in the United States. In the 1970s, Pillsbury licensed the name Bundt from Nordic Ware and for a while sold a range of Bundt cake mixes.

To date more than 60 million Bundt pans have been sold by Nordic Ware across North America. November 15 has been named "National Bundt Day".

== See also ==
- Wonder Pot, a stovetop pot which uses a similar design
