= Erik Rasmussen (ice hockey) =

American ice hockey player (born 1977)

- Born: March 28, 1977 (age 49) Minneapolis, Minnesota, U.S.
- Height: 6 ft 1 in (185 cm)
- Weight: 210 lb (95 kg; 15 st 0 lb)
- Position: Left wing
- Shot: Left
- Played for: Buffalo Sabres; Los Angeles Kings; New Jersey Devils; Ässät
- National team: United States
- NHL draft: 7th overall, 1996; Buffalo Sabres
- Playing career: 1997–2009

Erik Wayne Rasmussen (born March 28, 1977) is a retired American professional ice hockey player.

== Early life ==
Rasmussen, originally from Minneapolis, Minnesota, gained statewide recognition in 1995 when he was awarded the prestigious Minnesota Mr. Hockey Award, an honor given annually to the most outstanding high school hockey player in the state. His talent and dedication earned him a spot with the University of Minnesota, where he competed in NCAA Division I hockey for two seasons.

== Career ==
Rasmussen was chosen seventh overall in the first round of the 1996 NHL entry draft by the Buffalo Sabres, marking him as one of the top prospects of his class. Throughout his professional career, Rasmussen suited up for the Sabres, Los Angeles Kings, and New Jersey Devils. During the 2007–08 season, he played for the Lowell Devils, the American Hockey League (AHL) affiliate of the New Jersey Devils. Following that season, Rasmussen took his talents overseas by signing with Porin Ässät, a team in Finland’s top professional league, the SM-liiga, for the 2008–09 season.

During his time with the Porin Ässät organization, Rasmussen played in 31 regular-season games, tallying one goal and eight assists. The team finished 12th in the standings and was forced into the play-out round to determine which club would face relegation against a Mestis team, Finland's second-tier league. After losing the play-out, Ässät faced Vaasan Sport in a best-of-seven relegation series. Rasmussen played in 13 total playoff and relegation games, contributing four goals and five assists for nine points. In the decisive seventh game of the series, he scored Ässät's first goal and assisted on their third, helping secure the team’s spot in the SM-liiga.

== Career statistics ==
=== Regular season and playoffs ===
			Regular season					Playoffs
Season	Team	League	GP	G	A	Pts	PIM	GP	G	A	Pts	PIM
1992–93	St. Louis Park High School	HS-MN	23	16	24	40	50	—	—	—	—	—
1993–94	St. Louis Park High School	HS-MN	18	25	18	43	80	—	—	—	—	—
1994–95	St. Louis Park High School	HS-MN	23	19	33	52	80	—	—	—	—	—
1995–96	University of Minnesota	WCHA	40	16	32	48	55	—	—	—	—	—
1996–97	University of Minnesota	WCHA	34	15	12	27	123	—	—	—	—	—
1997–98	Rochester Americans	AHL	53	9	14	23	83	1	0	0	0	5
1997–98	Buffalo Sabres	NHL	21	2	3	5	14	—	—	—	—	—
1998–99	Rochester Americans	AHL	37	12	14	26	47	—	—	—	—	—
1998–99	Buffalo Sabres	NHL	42	3	7	10	37	21	2	4	6	18
1999–2000	Buffalo Sabres	NHL	67	8	6	14	43	3	0	0	0	4
2000–01	Buffalo Sabres	NHL	82	12	19	31	51	3	0	1	1	0
2001–02	Buffalo Sabres	NHL	69	8	11	19	34	—	—	—	—	—
2002–03	Los Angeles Kings	NHL	57	4	12	16	28	—	—	—	—	—
2003–04	New Jersey Devils	NHL	69	7	6	13	41	5	0	2	2	2
2005–06	New Jersey Devils	NHL	67	5	5	10	32	9	0	0	0	8
2006–07	New Jersey Devils	NHL	71	3	7	10	25	11	0	0	0	14
2007–08	Lowell Devils	AHL	26	2	3	5	14	—	—	—	—	—
2008–09	Ässät	SM-l	31	1	8	9	60	—	—	—	—	—
NHL totals			545	52	76	128	305	52	2	7	9	46

=== International ===
Year	Team	Event	GP	G	A	Pts	PIM
1996	United States	WJC	6	0	1	1	16
1997	United States	WJC	6	4	5	9	4
2002	United States	WC	7	0	1	1	2
Junior totals			12	4	6	10	20

== Awards and honors ==
Award	Year
All-WCHA Rookie Team	1995–96

Sporting positions
Preceded by Martin Biron	Buffalo Sabres first-round draft pick 1996	Succeeded by Mika Noronen
