= Nadia Mohamed =

American politician from Minnesota

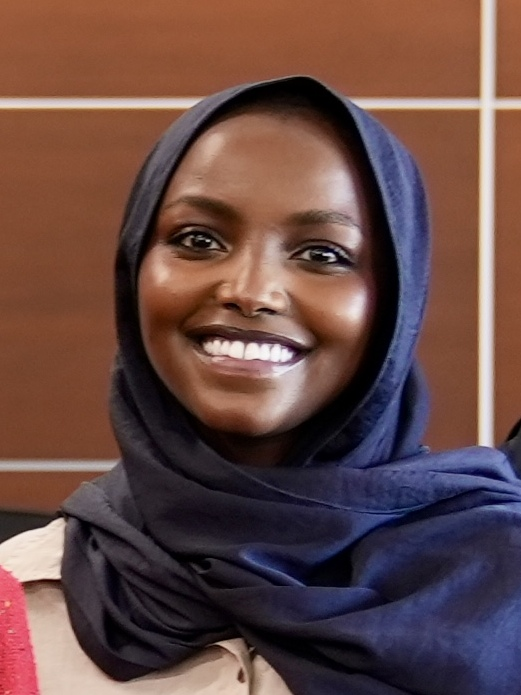
- Mohamed in 2024

Mayor of St. Louis Park
- Incumbent
- Assumed office January 3, 2022
- Preceded by: Jake Spano

Personal details
- Born: 1996 (age 29–30) Somalia
- Party: Democratic (DFL)
- Education: Metropolitan State University

Nadia Mohamed (Somali: Nadiina Maxamed; Arabic: نادية محمد) (born c. 1996) is an American politician serving since 2023 as the mayor of St. Louis Park, Minnesota. Mohamed is the first Somali American to be elected mayor of a U.S. city. (Note: Deqa Dhalac, of South Portland, was the first Somali-American mayor in the United States, but was selected by the city council, not elected in an open election.)

== Early life and education ==
Mohamed immigrated to the United States with her family as refugees when she was 10. Her family settled in St. Louis Park, Minnesota. She has a bachelor's degree in HR from Metropolitan State University. Mohamed works for the State of Minnesota as a training manager for social workers.

== Career ==
In 2019, at age 23, she was elected to the St. Louis Park city council, becoming its youngest-ever and first Muslim member. On November 7, 2023, Mohamed defeated retired banker Dale A. Anderson in the municipal election to succeed outgoing Mayor Jake Spano. Endorsed by Spano, she won 58% of the vote. The Star Tribune described her 2023 mayoral campaign as focused on investment in community policing and programs to make homeownership more affordable.

== Electoral history ==
2023 St Louis Park Mayoral Election by precinct Mohamed: 50–60%; 60–70%; Anderson: 50–60%

2023 St. Louis Park mayoral election
Party	Candidate	Votes	%
Nonpartisan	Nadia Mohamed	4,595	58.45
Nonpartisan	Dale A. Anderson	3,239	41.20
Write-in		27	0.34
