= Cecily Brownstone =

American journalist

Cecily Brownstone (18 April 1909 – 30 August 2005) was a Canadian-born American food writer, who wrote several cookbooks and articles about food over a period of 39 years. She was the Associated Press Food Editor from 1947 to 1986—for thirty-nine years. During that time she was the most widely published of syndicated food writers. The five recipe columns and two food features she wrote for the Associated Press each week appeared in papers all over the United States, in addition to a number of other countries. Brownstone's personal papers and cookbook collection is the unique expression of her personal interest in and encyclopedic knowledge of American culinary history and cookbooks, and her career in the food field.

== Early life ==
Brownstone was born in Plum Coulee, Manitoba, in 1909, growing up in Winnipeg, the fourth of five sisters. She attended the University of Manitoba and came to New York City to pursue her studies and to work. She lived in Greenwich Village, appropriately enough in a brownstone house, in a duplex apartment that included a spectacular test kitchen, and that housed her large cookbook collection. Early in her career as a journalist, Brownstone was the Food Editor of Parents magazine and the Child Care Editor of Family Circle magazine.

== Other work ==
Brownstone was also a consultant to Carl Sontheimer, president of Cuisinart, a physicist, entrepreneur, and founder of the food processor industry in America. With Sontheimer, Brownstone edited the highly regarded magazine, Pleasures of Cooking, and wrote Classic Cakes and Other Great Cuisinart Desserts in 1994.

She also wrote a book for children, All Kinds of Mothers, illustrated by her niece, the artist Miriam Brofsky Kley. In 1972 she came out with Cecily Brownstone's Associated Press Cookbook.

== Food writers as friends ==
Brownstone was a close friend and confidant of James Beard and Joy of Cooking authors, Irma S. Rombauer and Marion Rombauer Becker, and other noted cookbook and food writers. She and Beard phoned each other almost daily, at 8 a.m., and their friendship is mentioned in two recent biographies of Beard. Brownstone's collection includes 93 letters and postcards from Irma Rombauer and about 45 of Marion Becker's letters. During the last five years of Becker's life she phoned Brownstone for an hour every weekend; they were close friends, and Brownstone is mentioned often in Anne Mendelson's recent biography of Irma Rombauer and her daughter. Brownstone's collection includes signed, inscribed copies of almost every edition of Joy of Cooking, sent to her first by Irma Rombauer, and later by Marion Becker.

The New York Times food columnist Molly O'Neil called Brownstone one of the "cornerstones of authentic cooking in New York."

In 1954, Brownstone had the opportunity to travel to Denmark at the invitation of the Danish government. On this tour, Brownstone was invited to tour palaces, dairies, fish canneries, ham factories, and other food plants. Among the other eleven food authors who were invited was Toronto Star's Margaret Carr.

Upon Brownstone's retirement, former New York Times Food Editor Jane Nickerson wrote: "Of syndicated food writers, she's been the most widely read." Nickerson added: Brownstone's recipes were always "unusual, appetizing, and accurate down to the last one-eighth of a teaspoon of salt." Brownstone's "success derived, in my view, from her sensitivity to readers' tastes and her insistence that recipes give high, appealing results."

Brownstone died in 2005 in New York City.

== Bibliography ==
- Cecily Brownstone's Associated Press Cookbook (A.P., 1972)
- Classic Cakes and Other Great Cuisinart Desserts (Hearst Books, 1994), with Carl Sontheimer.
