= Murder of Eleanor Doney =

2025 murder in Ontario, Canada

- Location: Pickering, Ontario, Canada
- Date: May 29, 2025 c.3:00 p.m. (EST)
- Target: Random civilians
- Attack type: Murder, stabbing
- Weapon: Cuisinart kitchen knife
- Deaths: 1
- Victim: Eleanor Doney
- Motive: Obsession with violence
- Accused: A.S.
- Charges: First-degree murder
- Verdict: 10 years
- Judge: Lisa Wannamaker

On May 29, 2025, 83-year-old Eleanor Doney was stabbed to death outside of her home in an unprovoked attack by a then 14-year-old boy in Pickering, Ontario, Canada. The suspect was charged with first-degree murder and was sentenced to six years in custody and four years under community supervision.

== Background ==
Eleanor Doney was an 83-year-old grandmother and retired kindergarten teacher. Doney had a husband of 63 years.

== Murder ==
CCTV cameras captured the suspect walking on a sidewalk while carrying a suitcase and wearing a black trenchcoat, dress shoes, a face mask and gloves. He talked to Doney while she was cleaning her yard before attacking her. At around 3:05 p.m., the Durham Regional Police Service responded to a call about unknown trouble at a home on Lynn Heights Drive. Upon arrival, they found an elderly woman lying in front of her house with eight stab wounds, including to her neck and face. She was transported to hospital where she succumbed to her injuries. The suspect fled the scene and left the knife in a wooded area. He was later arrested at his home.

== Suspect ==
The suspect was charged with five years in custody and four years under supervision. He already had served 13 months in custody. He got into a fight with another inmate at the youth facility he was being held at and said he "hasn't felt this alive" since the murder. Although the suspect could not be identified under the Youth Criminal Justice Act, judge Lisa Wannamaker said the suspects initials are A.S. His family immigrated to Canada from Pakistan in the 1970s to 1980s. He reportedly had a fascination with violence and murder. Leading up to the attack, he had searched online for serial killers, stabbings and how to evade police without detection. He also told students at his school that he contemplated killing his grandmother or a child and hurting animals. In court, he said "after months of reflection, my perspective of the matter has been deduced. I've come to comprehend, to recognize the seriousness of my actions and see how my actions have caused a great deal of pain. Sincerely, I'm deeply sorry for all of the horrible deeds I have committed, first of all, and I had no right to commit that wretched act. What I can do is learn from this and acknowledge my wrongdoings and work on restructuring. Moving forward, I will do better and learn from this. I will try and pray to God for a chance at being a righteous man despite my flaws." Just a few days before the murder, he was suspended from school after being caught carrying a knife, which he said was for protection. Investigators found photos he had taken of the intersection near Doney's house nearly two weeks before the attack. Defence Erin Dann said he tried to look like Yoshikage Kira, a serial killer who dresses in a suit and carries a briefcase and the main antagonist of Diamond Is Unbreakable, the fourth arc of the anime and manga series JoJo's Bizarre Adventure, and Patrick Bateman, a serial killer from the horror movie American Psycho.

== Reactions ==
Locals and the online community were angered by the fact that the attack was preventable and warning signs were missed. Many people argued that the suspect should have been tried as an adult due to the nature of the attack.
