= Helena Olofsdotter =

Swedish folk healer

Helena "Elin" Olofsdotter, known as "Sjumans-Elin" ("Seven Men's Elin"), was a Swedish cunning woman or folk healer. She was one of the people accused of witchcraft in the Katarina witch trials during the witch hunt known as the Great noise, which took place in Sweden in 1668–1676.

== Life ==
Helena Olofsdotter was born to a rittmaster from Götaland. She was officially stated to be a widow, and had several children.

Her marital history was, however, somewhat unclear. She had been married several times and was called "Sjumans-Elin" ("Seven Men's Elin") because of her love life. At least one of her marriages had not ended with the death of her husband, since it is listed as having ended with a formal separation. Because of her marital life, the vicar of her congregation had refused to give her permission to marry again. She was poor, and supported herself and her children by selling cereal grained by a burr mill, and by working as a folk healer, and was said to be particularly skillful in treating erysipelas.

=== Charge ===
In 1676, the Katarina witch trials took place. In April 1676, Brita Zippel was executed for sorcery, and her husband, the mason Jöran Nilsson Galle, was also arrested and imprisoned on charge of sorcery. Galle and his daughter Annika Jöransdotter pointed out three folk healers: the women Helena Olofsdotter, Elsa Thomasdotter and Erik Eriksson, who had all treated Galle as physicians on occasion, for witchcraft. They were duly arrested and charged with sorcery in July.

The trial against the three folk healers posed a problem for the Witchcraft Commission. While folk healers were often reported to the authorities because they customarily used spells including the name of God in their treatments, they were normally given light sentences by the judges, who customarily preferred to charge them with superstition rather than witchcraft.

The court had assembled to investigate the alleged abduction of children by witches to the witches' sabbath of Satan in Blockula, which was the purpose of the Katarina witch trials, and the accusation against the folk healers for sorcery did not fit the narrative of the rest of the trials.

Despite the intense witch hunt going on when the three folk healers were put on trial, no witness stepped forward to accuse them of having abducted children to the witches' sabbath, or of having done anything but good with their spells. This set them aside from the other people accused during the witch trials.

=== Trial ===
Helena Olofsdotter had been hired to treat the syphilis of Jöran Nilsson Galle. Like many other folk healers, she used magical chants during her treatments which included the name of God. This was illegal since it was considered abusing the name of God.

Galle's daughter Annika claimed that Helena had traded magical services, and used her burr mill for magical purposes. She claimed that Helena had offered Brita Zippel to use her burr mill to grain a bit of a shift belonging to a maidservant she suspected of theft, and the maid would return what she stole. According to Annika, this service had worked as promised, and the maidservant had indeed returned to stolen goods the same night.

Helena Olofsdotter appeared humble, regretful and full of excuses before the court. She stated that she had intended no harm, but rather intended to help with using the name of God. With regard to the magical practices she had performed in exchange for money, she stated her observation that of those she had healed or helped by magical services, those who believed in the magic had recovered, while her services had no effect on people that did not believe in them.

The court reprimanded her and stated that she had abused the name of God and enticed people to blasphemy and damnation. She referred to her own ignorance and lack of education and promised that she would live a better life forward. She was given an unexpected amount of support from her community, and several of her neighbours testified to her favor. This was given some weight by the court.

=== Verdict ===
The court decided to deal with the three folk healers in accordance with the normal custom when folk healers were accused of sorcery. Elsa Thomasdotter, Helena Olofsdotter and Erik Eriksson admitted to having abused the name of God in their spells during their treatments, stated their regret, asked for mercy and were given a sentence of pillorying, after which they were released and formally banished from the city borders.
