= Prusurate =

Croatian Christmas dessert

- Type: Doughnut
- Place of origin: Croatia
- Main ingredients: dough, fruit, milk and sugar glaze

Prusurate is a Croatian dessert that is made for Christmas. It is made from a dough containing fruit bits and is fried in oil. It can be topped with powdered sugar or a glaze made from milk and sugar.

== See also ==
- Yugoslavian cuisine (disambiguation)
- List of fried dough foods
- List of doughnut varieties
