= Margaret Carr (writer) =

Canadian columnist and food editor

Margaret Jean Carr (née Heron; 28 January 1913 – 17 July 2008) was a Canadian columnist and food editor. She is best known for writing the Toronto Star daily column, "Cooking Chat".

== Education ==
Carr graduated from the University of Toronto with a degree in Home economics.

== Career ==
Prior to writing "Cooking Chat", she worked in the Canadian Embassy in Washington for five years. During this time, Carr's husband, Kenneth Randall Carr (29 January 1913 – 3 November 1983), worked at the British Air Commission.

Upon returning from Washington to the Greater Toronto Area in 1950, she became Jean Brodie Firth's assistant for the second time. Jean Brodie Firth, who was the editor of the cooking pages for the Toronto Star Weekly, recommended Carr be the author for "Cooking Chat" upon her retirement after 34 years at the Star. This move replaced Marjorie Elwood, who had written the column for three and a half years, with Carr. Meanwhile, Elwood replaced Firth's position. These changes were announced on the front page of the Toronto Star on 6 January 1951. Carr was thirty-seven when she was appointed to the role.

=== "Cooking Chat" ===
Each day, thousands of women read Carr's "Cooking Chat" to learn about the ever-evolving nature of food and its methods of consumption in the twentieth-century. When the juice company, Tropicana, emerged in this period, Carr frequently featured orange juice and other newly more accessible fruits in her holiday recipes throughout the 1950s.

As more and more people gained access to home refrigeration, electric stoves, and freezing, Carr wrote to her readership new methodologies to best use these recent innovations to convenience their lives. For example, Carr featured recipes for dishes that were meant to be made ahead, frozen, or cooked in new, more convenient ways.

As the appreciation for cuisines of multiple nationalities grew in Canada throughout the 1960s, such as the influx of new Chinese restaurants across the country, Carr provided recipes, advice, and recommended cookbooks to her readership that reflected this trend. For example, as Toronto grew more multicultural, Carr recommended recipes, methods, and cookbooks that featured recipes from the Yugoslavian, Austrian, Chinese and other Asian cultures. Carr also brought attention to Dorothy Allen Gray's 1963 cookbook, Fare Exchange, which highlighted Canada's new multiculturalism by gathering recipes from Canadians of various cultural backgrounds.

Carr also gave life advice surrounding food to her female readership. To prepare for Valentine's Day in 1962, Carr advised that although her readers may prefer the more romantic and material side to the day, that the men in their lives often prefer more solid pleasures. Carr's advice for the day was to woo him through food. Specifically, the recipe for colorful cherry tarts complete with pastry hearts as a garnish that she so helpfully provided in her column.

While women read Carr's "Cooking Chat" to learn about the continuously changing innovations, methods of cooking, and newly available ingredients in the twentieth-century Canadian world of food, Carr also frequently reflected upon steady staples in the Canadian diet. One such example, as noted by the Canadian food historian Dorothy Duncan, was Carr's May 1954 reflection on the continual popularity of tea in Canada. However, even though a Canadian fondness for tea was consistent throughout the century, Carr also reflects that the method of consumption had changed from loose leaf to evolving styles of teabags within the century.

In 1953, she was the only Canadian among fifty culinary journalists to be invited to Paris for a weekend conference.

On 5 May 1954, it was announced in the Toronto Star that Carr would be flying to Denmark with eleven other food editors from North America as a guest of the Danish Government. Among the established food authors were names such as Cecily Brownstone, although Carr was the only Canadian to be invited. For this tour, Carr had the opportunity to first go to New York City for a farewell lunch at the Copenhagen restaurant where she met the president of the Scandinavian Airlines and the Danish Consul General. From there, the food editors traveled to Copenhagen and were invited by the Danish government to tour palaces, dairies, fish canneries, bacon and ham factories, and other plants in Denmark whose goods were shipped to Canada for export in 1954. They were also invited to meet several "prominent Danes within politics, economics, trade, arts and crafts and the minister of foreign affairs".

Carr's "Cooking Chat" was so influential in the Toronto world of food that when the Toronto International Institute was writing their Season's Greetings in Food – Christmas 1963 cookbook, they purposefully emulated Carr's writing style by frequently saving clippings of her column for their reference. They strove, like Carr, to cheerily promote culinary diversity in a fun, economical, and nutritious manner.

== Personal life ==
Carr was married to Kenneth Randall Carr for forty-three years upon his death. Together they had four children; Susan, Martha, John, and Charlotte.

Susan and Martha, the eldest two, were the ages of four and two respectively when Carr began writing "Cooking Chat" in 1951.

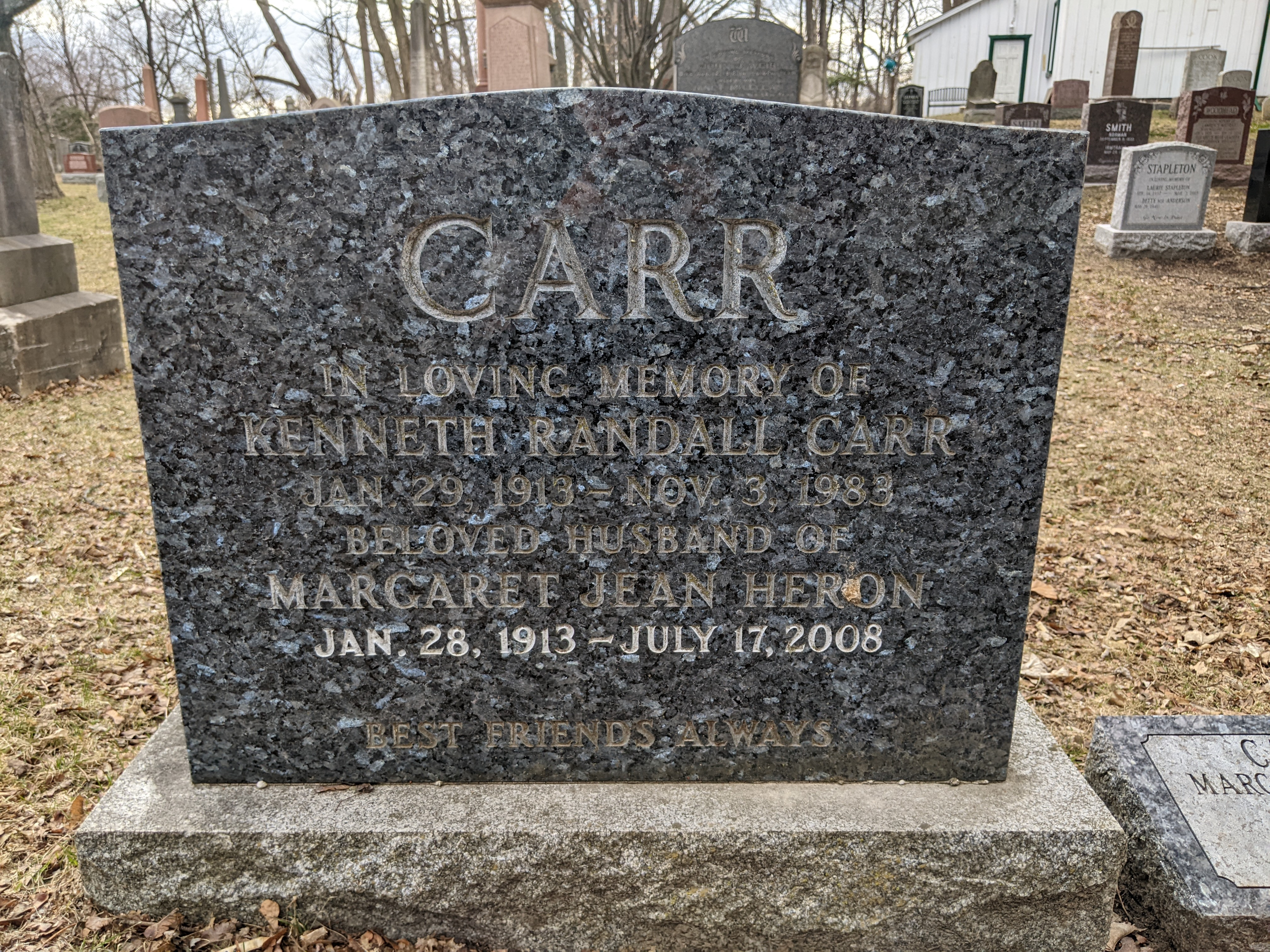
Kenneth Randall Carr's Grave in Saint Andrew's Presbyterian Cemetery Scarborough, Ontario

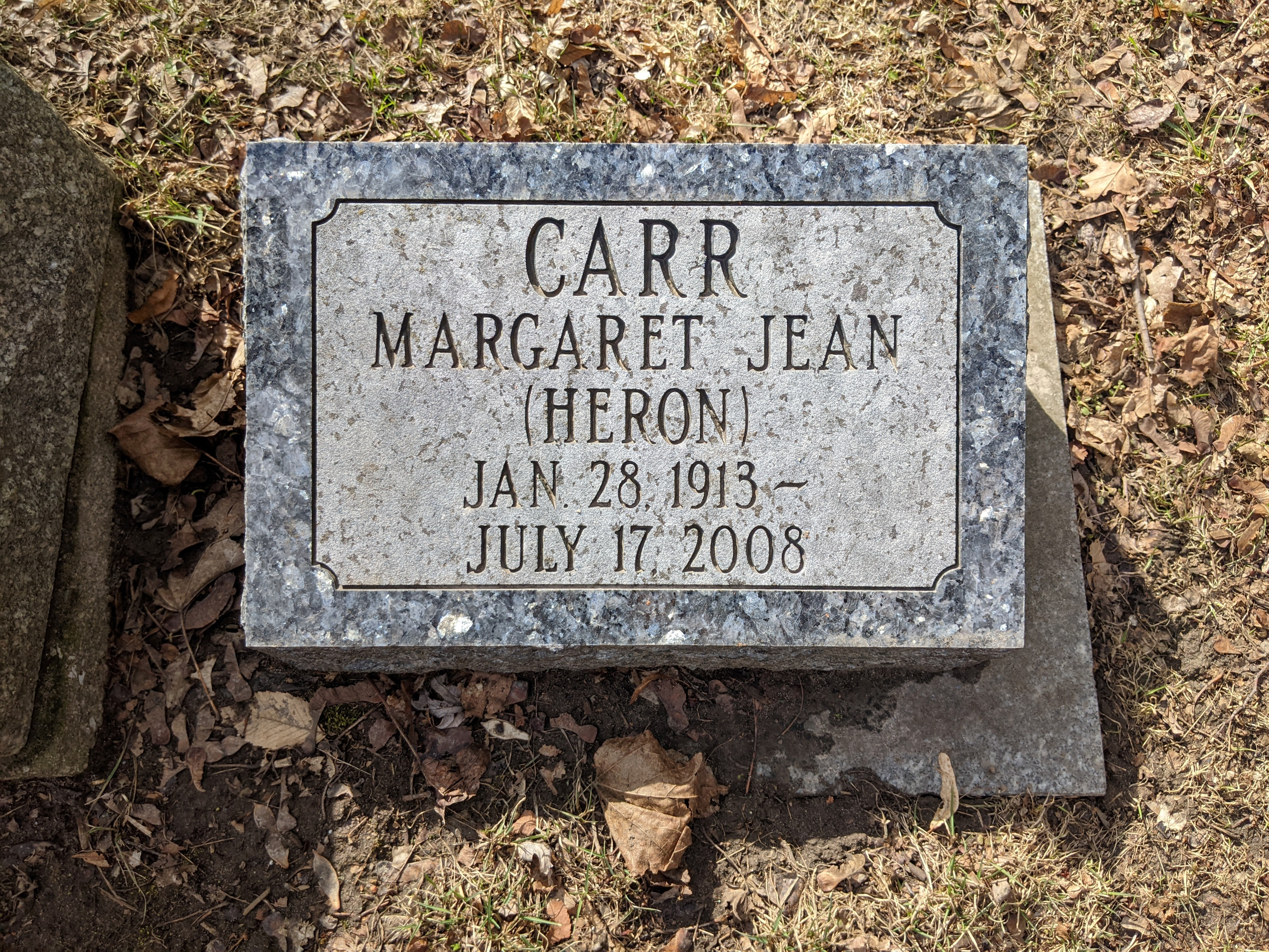
Margaret Carr's Grave in Saint Andrew's Presbyterian Cemetery Scarborough, Ontario

Carr died on Thursday, 17 July 2008, at the age of 95. On Saturday, 19 July 2008, funeral services were held at Saint Andrew's Presbyterian Church in Scarborough in honorarium. Carr is buried at Saint Andrew's Presbyterian Church Cemetery next to her husband.
