= Kitchen robot =

Kitchen robot may refer to

- Robots used in kitchens - see Robotics § Applications
- Food processor appliance
