= Museum of Salt and Pepper Shakers =

Museum in Gatlinburg, Tennessee, U.S.

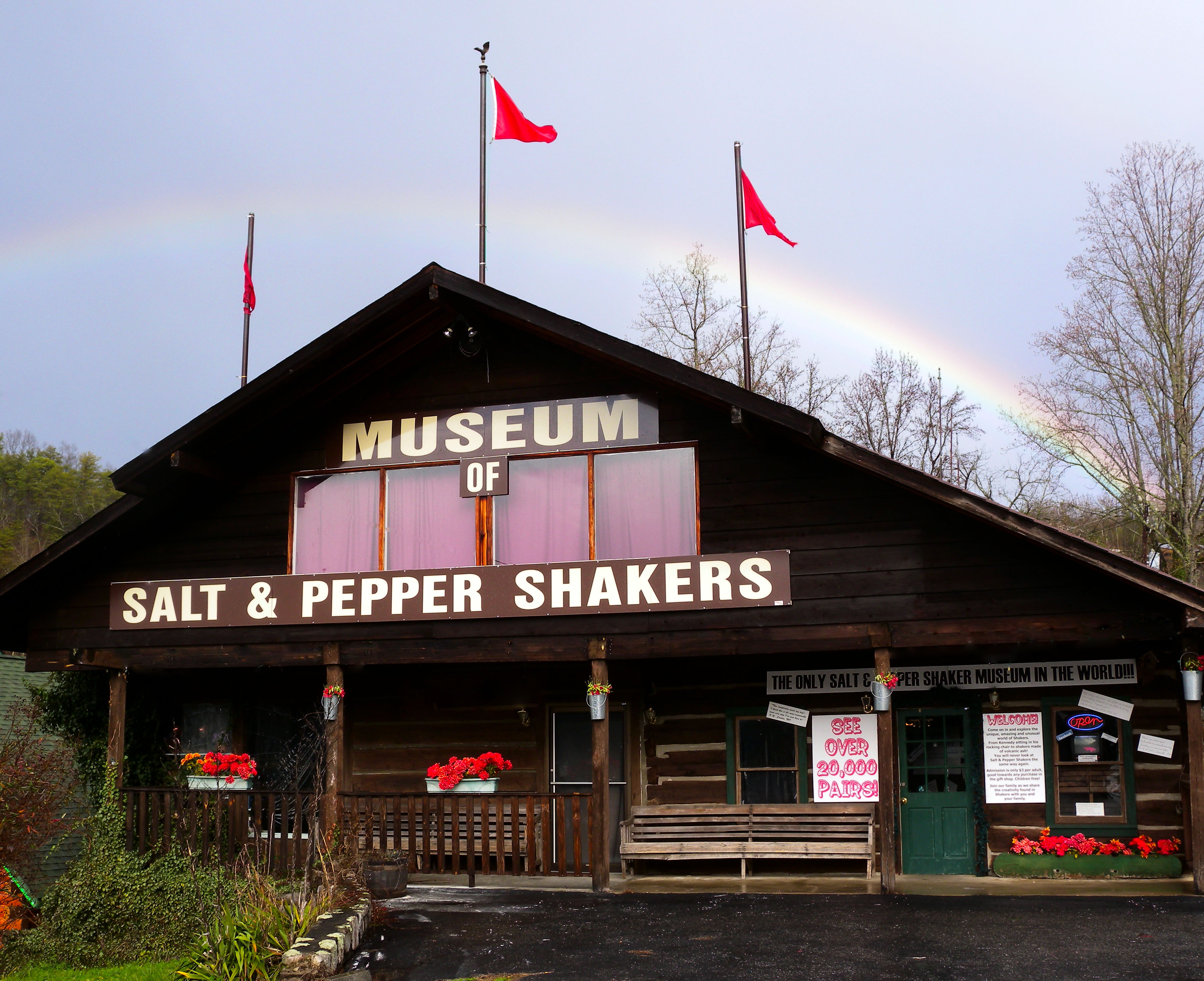

- Location within Tennessee Location within the United States
- Established: 2002
- Location: 461 Brookside Village Way, Gatlinburg, Tennessee, United States
- Coordinates: 35.715979°N 83.502480°W
- Website: thesaltandpeppershakermuseum.com

The Museum of Salt and Pepper Shakers is located in Gatlinburg, Tennessee. It houses more than 20,000 pairs of salt and pepper shakers from all over the world. There is also a sister museum in El Castell de Guadalest, Alicante, Spain, which displays another 20,000 pairs. The museum was founded in 2002 by Andrea Ludden, a Belgian archaeologist. Her stated goal was to show the creativity of all the artists that have crafted an everyday item into a myriad of shapes and materials.

== History ==
Andrea started collecting pepper mills in 1984 and soon, salt and pepper shakers became the focus of her collection. In 2002, the museum opened in Cosby, Tennessee before moving to Winery Square, in Gatlinburg, Tennessee in 2005. According to Food Network's Unwrapped TV program, over 20,000 people have visited the museum in 2005.

In May 2010, Andrea opened a sister museum "Museo de Saleros y Pimenteros" in El Castell de Guadalest, Alicante, Spain.

== Organization and purpose ==
The galleries consist of many display cases which exhibit the shakers in categories: Christmas, Plastic, Americana, Amish, Wood, Vegetables, Transportation, Chefs, Foods, Drinks, Chickens, Cows, Cats and Dogs, Wild Animals, Marine, Characters, Souvenirs, Asian, Glass, Metals and Delft. The shakers are also organized by material and color, and if a particular set comes in more than one color, these are included to show all the possibilities.

There is a section dedicated to Morton Salt Company, which explains how shakers came to be, thanks to Morton's invention that helps salt not clump together. Before shakers, salt was stored in salt cellars, which are also displayed in the collection. The museum also includes more than 1500 Pepper Mills.

The museums have both an entertainment and educational purpose. As Andrea Ludden said: "All my effort is to show the 20s, the 40s, the 60s, etc, how civilization can change, you see it through the salt and pepper shakers". The museum is often visited by art students as well as home schoolers. The museum is also a dog-friendly establishment.

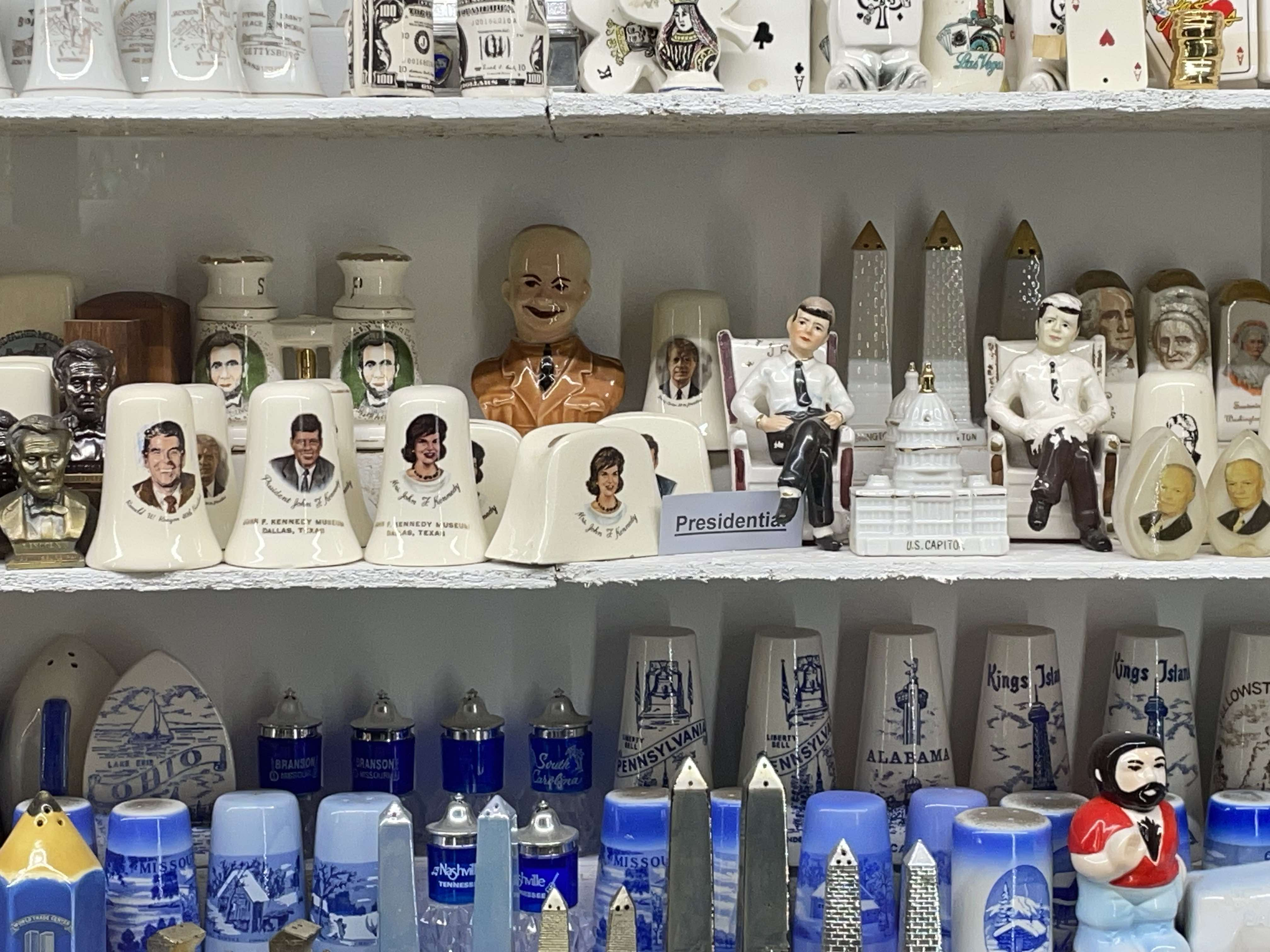
Presidential salt and pepper shakers

The museum is often consulted to settle the question of How many holes for Salt or Pepper?

== In the media ==
The two museums are often in the media. After seeing how a mundane item can be both utilitarian and decorative, many artists were inspired to create unusual, comical, but practical shakers. What surprises visitors and reviewers alike, is that once the variety is revealed, they can never be taken for granted again.

- The museum was featured in 2006 in the Food Network's Unwrapped with Marc Summers, Episode 1402.
- Rob Wilds interviewed Andrea for the TV program Tennessee Crossroads.
- The museums are often featured in various top 10 strangest or unusual museums lists, such as Travel and Leisure, CNN Travel, The Saturday Evening Post, El Mundo, Vanity Fair, etc.
- On July 18, 2009 the museum was mentioned in a skit on Late Night With Jimmy Fallon (NBC).
- For the opening of the museum in Spain, Andrea was interviewed on the Valencian TV station Canal Nou.
- In 2012, the museum appeared in the Smithsonian magazine online.
- Also in 2012, the museum was featured in the book "Harriet Beamer Takes the Bus", by Joyce Magnin. This very entertaining book relates Harriet Beamer's visit of the museum, and her growing collection of salt and pepper shakers.
- The American Profile article was syndicated to the Sunday section of many newspapers throughout the country.
- There have been several radio interviews, such as Australia's ABC Radio, PBS Radio KCBX Podcast, American Voices - Senator Bill Bradley interview on Sirius (9/19/2015).
- The Associated Press article by Caryn Rousseau appeared in many newspapers around the country, such as the News-Herald, Deseret News, South Coast Today, etc.
- In 2015, the museum was published in The Guardian.
