= El Castell de Guadalest =

Valencian town and municipality

Coordinates: 38°40′37″N 0°11′52″W

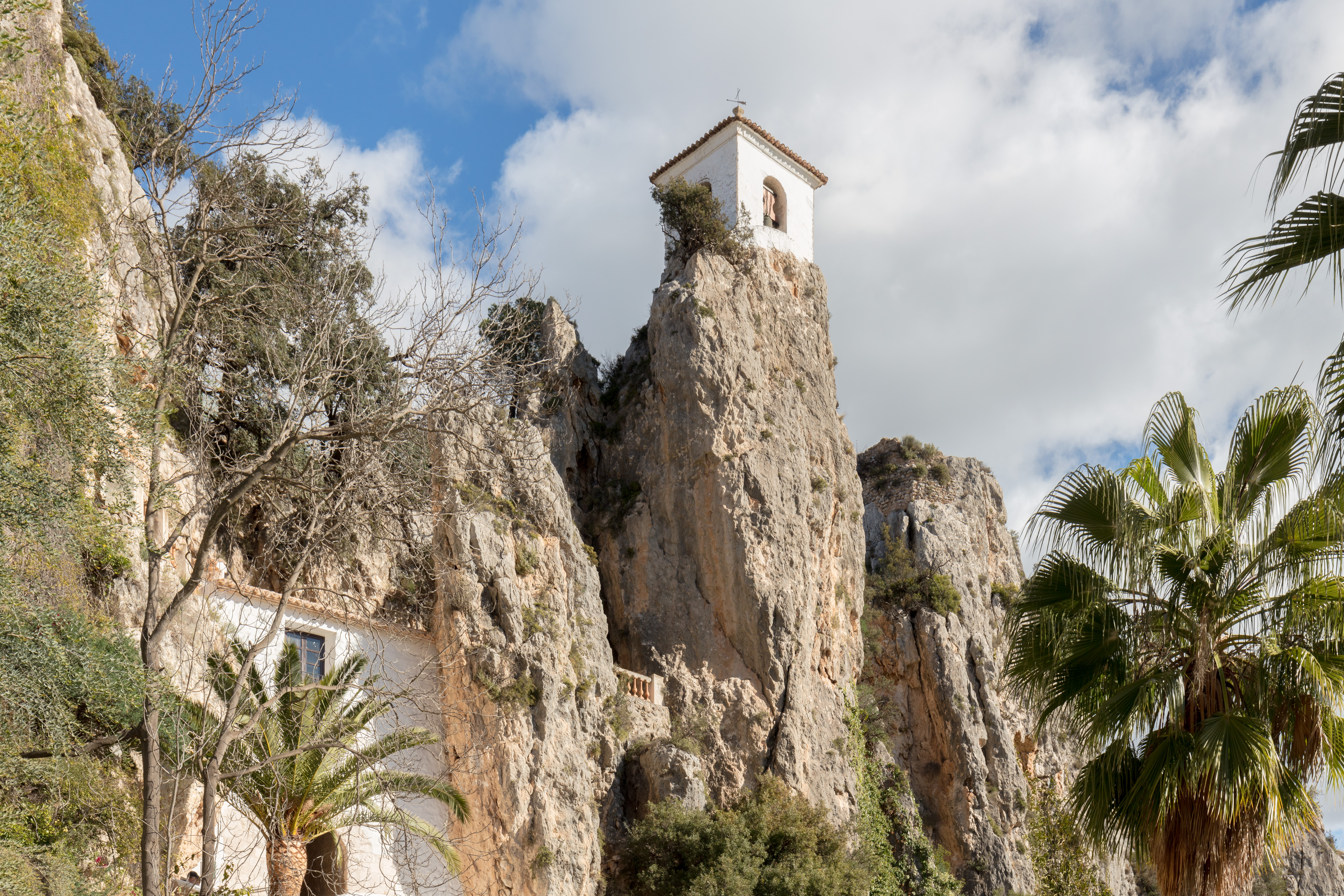
The tourist town of Guadalest.

El Castell de Guadalest's flag

El Castell de Guadalest's coat of arms

El Castell de Guadalest (Valencian pronunciation: [el kasˈteʎ de ɣwaðaˈlest]) or simply Guadalest (Spanish pronunciation: [ɡwaðaˈlest]), is a Valencian town and municipality located in a mountainous area of the comarca of Marina Baixa, in the province of Alicante, Spain. Guadalest has an area of 16 km² and, according to the 2002 census, a total population of 189 inhabitants.

== History ==
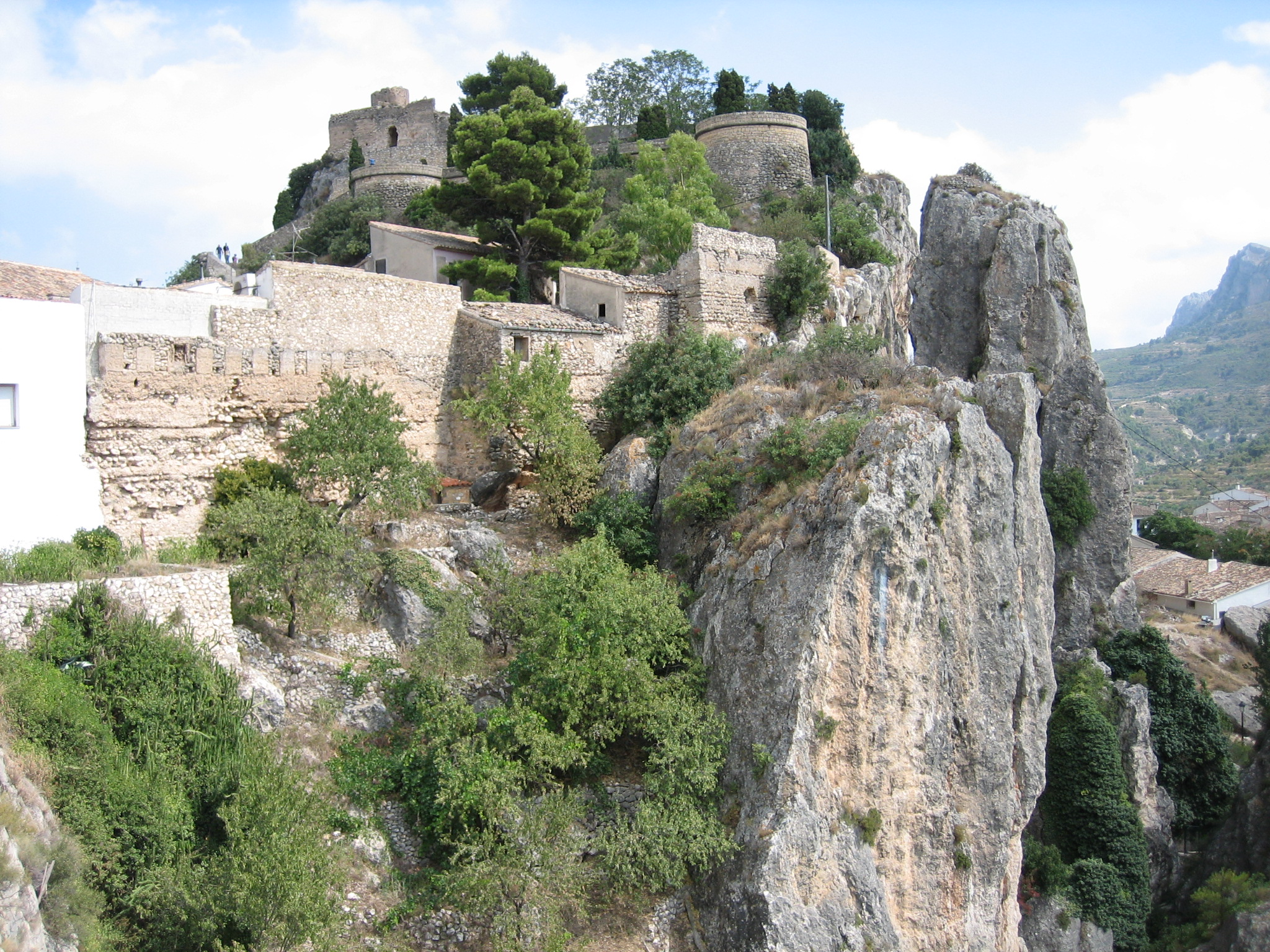
View of the castle nowadays with a part of the fortifications still visible.

The medieval castle overshadowing the Guadalest valley was originally built in the 11th century, during the Muslim rule over the Iberian Peninsula. It served to control the valley, as infighting between the smaller kingdoms left by the disintegration of the Caliphate of Córdoba was constant.

In the 13th century, after the Christian conquest of the region, the castle and the town were incorporated into the Kingdom of Valencia by James I of Aragon. As Christian colonization was anecdotal, Muslim inhabitants of the region were allowed to remain in the valley and work its land until the expulsion of the Moriscos. The site then changed hands over the centuries.

On June 22, 1644, an earthquake partly destroyed the fortress. In 1708, during the War of the Spanish Succession, a mine blew up its western aisle during a battle. Only a small, ruined, portion of the castle still towers over the valley.

== Tourism ==
The economy of Guadalest is mainly based on tourism. The town has many remarkable monuments and interesting places to visit:

- Castle of L'Alcazaiba or Sant Josep, built in the 11th century by Muslims.
- Castle of the King.
- Tower-crag of Alcalà.
- Baroque Catholic church of Mare de Déu de l'Assumpció, built between 1740 and 1753.
- Jail, built in the 12th century. It conserves a dungeon.
- Antonio Marco Museum
- Ethnological Museum
- Historical Motorcycle Museum Vall de Guadalest, a collection of over a hundred motorcycles and some small cars, all in perfect condition.
- Micro-Gigantic Museum
- Miniatures Museum
- Ribera Girona Museum
- The Salt & Pepper Shaker Museum, 20,000 salt and pepper shakers from around the world. (See also)
- Torture instruments Museum
- Town Museum Orduña House
- Aventuras Sobre Ruedas Alquiler de Autocaravanas

== Gallery ==
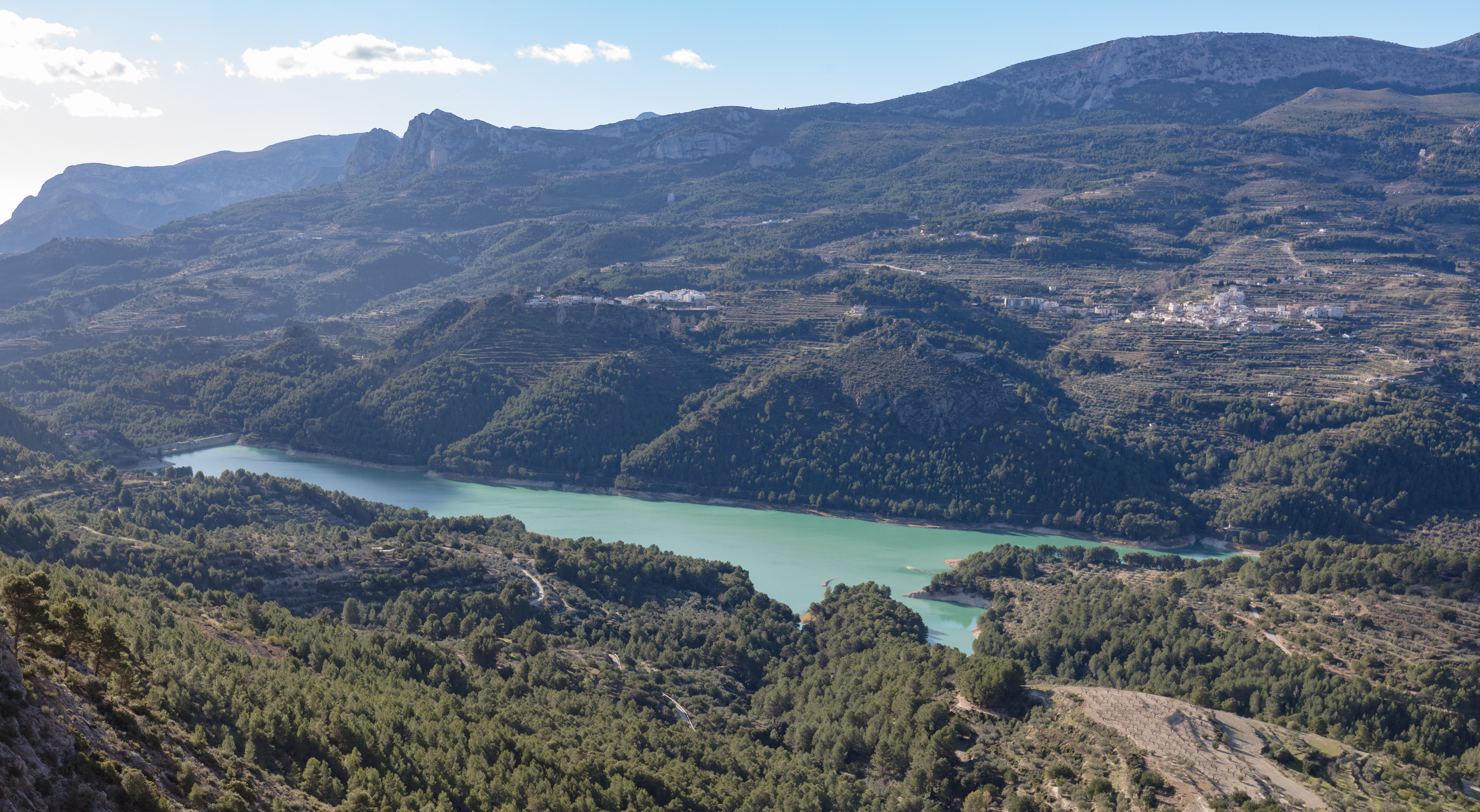
Reservoir of Guadalest

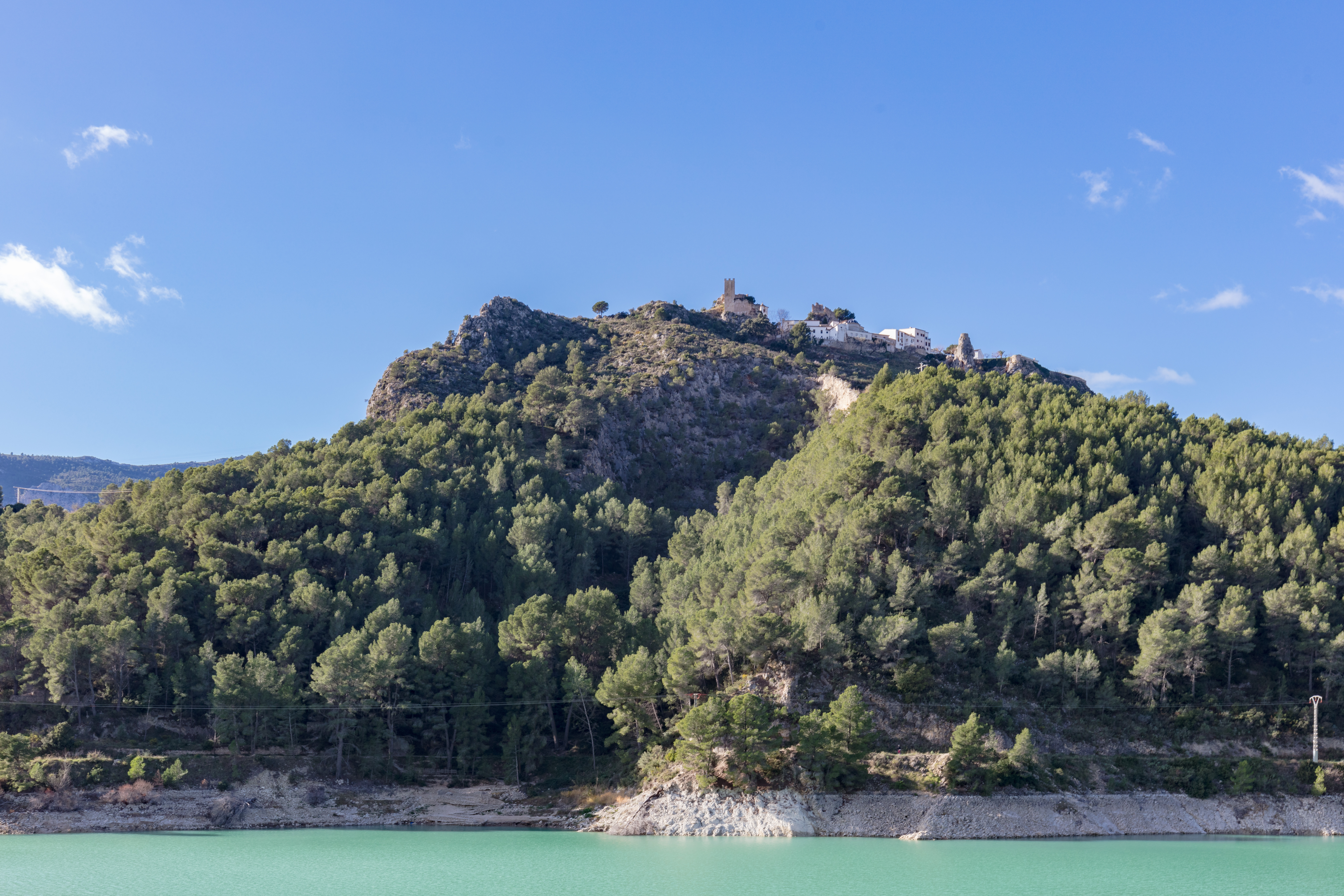
View of Guadalest from the reservoir

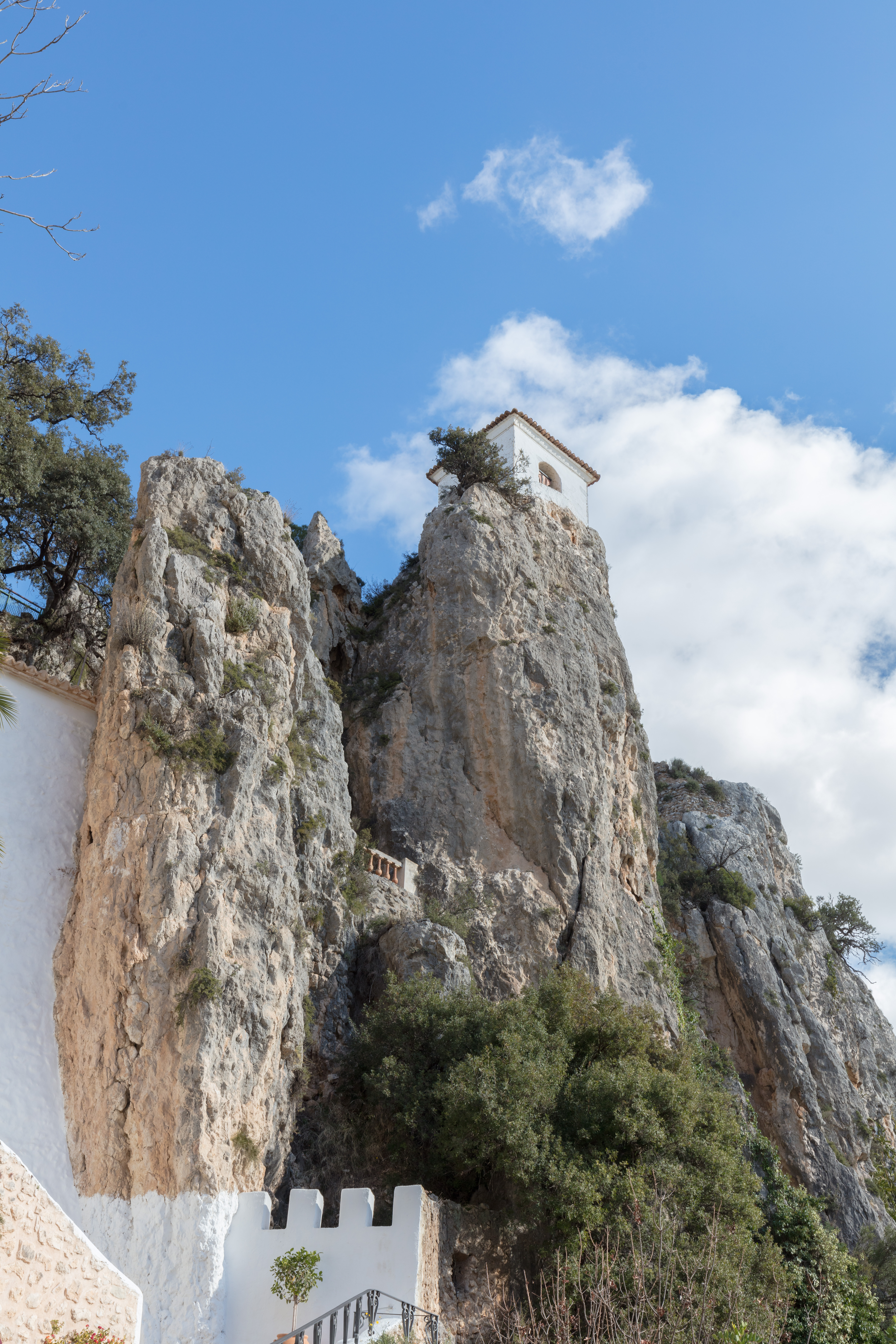
Bell tower

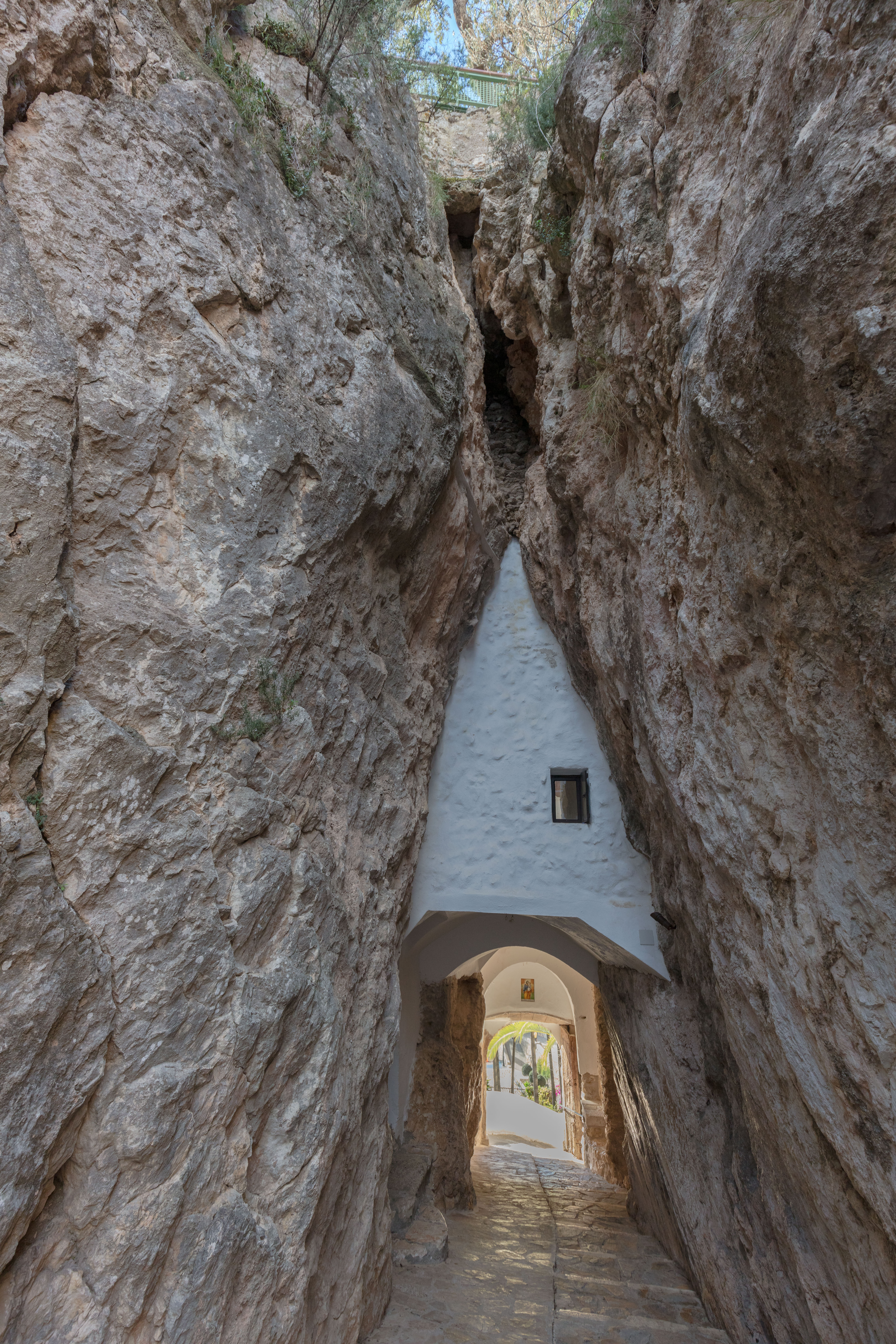
Passage in Guadalest
