= Cuisinart =

US home appliance brand

- Company type: Subsidiary
- Industry: Consumer Goods
- Founded: 1971; 55 years ago
- Founder: Carl Sontheimer
- Headquarters: Stamford, Connecticut, US
- Products: Cookware, ovenware, kitchen tools, kitchen accessories
- Parent: Conair Corporation (1989–present)
- Website: cuisinart.com

Cuisinart (/ˈkwiːzɪnɑːrt/ KWEE-zin-art) is an American kitchen appliance and cookware brand. It was founded in 1971 by Carl Sontheimer. Initially the company produced food processors, which were introduced at a food show in Chicago in 1973. The name "Cuisinart" (a portmanteau of "cuisine" and "art") became synonymous with "food processor" to the point where it was a proprietary eponym. Cuisinart was purchased by Conair Corporation in 1989.

== History ==
Cuisinart was founded in 1971 by Carl Sontheimer, a graduate of Massachusetts Institute of Technology who was inspired by his love of French food. This led to the creation of Cuisinarts, Inc. and its main product, the food processor. Cuisinart introduced its machine in January 1973 at a trade show in Chicago, a reworked and rebranded Robot-Coupe / Magimix 1800 food processor for North America in 1973 under the Cuisinart brand. This was as America's first home kitchen food processor. The success of Cuisinart was limited at first, until a review in Gourmet magazine helped to lift sales. Later, Sontheimer contracted with a Japanese manufacturer to produce new models in 1977 in order to immediately launch his new Japanese-made food processor in 1980 when his contract with Robot-Coupe expired. Cuisinart continued to sell both the Japanese-sourced new machines and the original French-sourced machines for a time.

Throughout the mid-1970s, Cuisinart sales rose due to the brand's association with celebrity chefs such as James Beard, a close friend of Sontheimer. Sales in 1980 were stated at 290,000 units. Cuisinart hired industrial designer Marc Harrison in the 1970s to design new products and improve other existing designs; many of the company's products became associated with universal design. Harrison made its products more functional for users with disabilities, designing larger fonts so that people with vision problems could see them.

By the mid-to-late 1980s, Cuisinart incurred financial troubles and suffered from falling sales. A group of investors bought Sontheimer's interest in the company in 1987 for $42 million. However, by August 1989, the company filed for bankruptcy. This led to Conair buying the company for $27 million in 1989.

== Legal troubles with Robot-Coupe ==
In the late 1970s, a legal dispute between Robot-Coupe and Cuisinart began when Robot-Coupe started marketing home food processors in the US under their own brand name. Robot-Coupe hired Alvin Fineman, Cuisinart's former marketing director in 1979, as president. They engaged in competitive advertisements which specifically named Cuisinart; this resulted in a lawsuit. A US federal court enjoined Robot-Coupe from continuing that particular ad, so Fineman's campaign changed to "There are many food processors made in Japan. The original is still made in France."

== Products ==
Products produced under the Cuisinart brand include:

- Air fryers
- Bakeware
- Handheld and standing blenders
- Bread machines
- Countertop blenders
- Brick ovens
- Can openers
- Coffeemakers
- Coffee grinders
- Convection ovens
- Cookware
- Cutlery
- Cutting boards
- Deep fryers
- Dutch ovens
- Espresso makers
- Food processors
- Grills, griddles
- Hand mixers
- Ice cream and sorbet makers
- Juice extractors
- Kettles
- Microwave ovens
- Popcorn makers
- Raclettes
- Rice cookers
- Scales
- Slow cookers
- Speciality appliances
- Stand mixers
- Toasters
- Toaster oven broilers
- Waffle makers
