= Jane Nickerson =

American writer (1916–2000)

- Born: May 19, 1916; Manhattan, New York City, U.S.
- Died: February 27, 2000 (aged 83); Lakeland, Florida, U.S.
- Education: Radcliffe College
- Occupations: Food writer, editor, restaurant critic
- Spouse: Alexander Francis Steinberg (1950-1972)
- Children: 4
- Writing career
- Years active: 1942-1988
- Subjects: Food, chefs, restaurants

Jane Nickerson (May 19, 1916 – February 27, 2000) was an American food writer, newspaper editor, cookbook editor, and restaurant critic. She created the position of food editor at The New York Times and was instrumental in the professional development of James Beard and Craig Claiborne. She was influential in the modernization of food journalism.

== Early life and education ==
Nickerson was born May 19, 1916, in Manhattan. She graduated from Radcliffe College in 1938.

== Career ==
In 1939, Nickerson began working for Ladies Home Journal as an editorial assistant. She then worked for The Saturday Evening Post before moving to The New York Times.

Nickerson was the first food editor and restaurant critic for the Times, filling the role from 1942 to 1957.

Among Nickerson's journalistic scoops was the creation of the cheeseburger, which was at the time innovative. She wrote in 1947, "At first, the combination of beef with cheese and tomatoes, which sometimes are used, may seem bizarre...(but) if you reflect a bit, you’ll understand the combination is sound gastronomically". She coined the phrase "food writer" in 1949.

Nickerson was unusual at the time for reporting on food trends, new technology, and food science and actively searching out and adapting in-use recipes; most US food editors of the time were primarily publishing recipes submitted to them by commercial food producers. She was also unusual at the time because nearly all of her work had news value; according to women's page journalism historian Kimberly Wilmot Voss, a professor of journalism at University of Central Florida, of 675 stories published during Nickerson's tenure at the Times as food editor, 646 had a news hook.

Nickerson left the Times in 1957 to move to Florida after her husband had been relocated there; she did not resume her career until 1973 when she became food editor for The Ledger. She published a cookbook, Jane Nickerson's Florida Cookbook, in 1973. She retired in 1988.

== Impact ==
Food historian Voss said Nickerson had laid the foundation for modern professional food writing. She wrote that while Claiborne has been credited with modernizing the profession, Nickerson had started down that path years before he was hired as her replacement. Voss also wrote that the social and professional relationships Beard had with Nickerson and Cecily Brownstone, whom Nickerson had introduced to Beard, were directly responsible for Beard's entry into and acceptance by New York's food culture. In 1945 Nickerson was one of the first food writers to interview and write about Beard. According to Voss, Nickerson "discovered" both Claiborne and Beard.

According to food historian Anne Mendelson, Nickerson was responsible for the prestige and national coverage of the Times’ food writing at the time Claiborne inherited the position.

According to The New York Times Magazine, Nickerson "made Craig Claiborne possible". Nickerson created or collected; adapted; and edited, uncredited, many of the recipes in Claiborne's 1961 The New York Times Cookbook.

The St. Louis Post-Dispatch called her "the most important food writer you've never heard of".

Food writer Molly O'Neill called Nickerson one of the first food journalists to apply ethical standards in her work, and wrote that her work, unlike that of most food writers of the time, was centered around the news value of the story.

Beard wrote Nickerson had "done more for dignified food coverage than anyone".

The Washington Post wrote that Nickerson "helped bring sober-minded reporting on food and food trends to a national audience".

== Personal life ==
Nickerson married Alexander Francis Steinberg in 1950; the couple had four children. They divorced in 1972.

== Death ==
Nickerson died February 27, 2000, in Lakeland, Florida. She was 83.
