= Marc Harrison =

Industrial designer

Marc Harrison (July 1, 1936 – September 22, 1998) was an industrial designer and educator whose work aligned with the idea of universal design that makes products easier to use for people with disabilities as well as people without disabilities.

== Biography ==
As the result of a brain injury when he was 11 years old, Harrison had to relearn basic functions such as walking and talking and thus gained inspiration for this career in industrial design. Harrison wanted to make the world more accessible for all people with or without disabilities. His work followed the idea of “Universal Design” in which products are designed for both disabled and non-disabled people without separate features or additions. He advocated for people with disabilities and the elderly, creating products that were held to a higher standard, changing the level all inventors must achieve. Harrison taught people to live on his legacy of improving products and major projects for a universal design everyone can use. He died on September 22, 1998, of amyotrophic lateral sclerosis.

=== Education ===
Harrison attended Pratt Institute for industrial design and graduated with a Bachelor of Fine Arts in 1958. Following Pratt, he earned his Masters of Arts from Cranbrook Academy of Art in 1959.

=== Career ===
After college he took a brief stint of freelance designing in New York City. Harrison took a position teaching at Rhode Island School of Design (RISD), where he became instrumental in establishing the Division of Architecture and Design. Harrison influenced the subway systems in New York City, Philadelphia, and Boston. Marc Harrison was the industrial designer that remodeled the Cuisinart Food processor in 1979 named the DLC-X.

== Industrial design ==
Harrison’s brain injury created a passion for industrial design and launched his career in the field. Due to his brain injury, his motor skills were damaged and it made him strive for a higher standard, designing products to make it easier on the consumer who may have a disability as he did.

=== Universal design ===
The design philosophy of the time was that products should be designed for those of average shape, size, and ability. Though the intention was that these products would work for many people, the elderly and disabled found products designed by this method to be difficult to use. Harrison turned this philosophy on its head by deciding that products should be designed for people of all abilities. This was the pioneering of a philosophy that came to be known as universal design. Harrison incorporated this design philosophy into projects both at RISD and with his private consulting firm, Marc Harrison Associates. Since universal design was first defined as "The design of products and environments to be usable by all people, to the greatest extent possible, without the need for adaptation or specialized design" it has been applied to many fields, including instruction, technology, services, and the built environment.

=== Cuisinart Food Processor DLC-X ===
Harrison's most famous design, which incorporated this philosophy, was the 1979 Cuisinart food processor (DLC-X). Harrison redesigned the food processor with large and easily pressed buttons, large and easily grasped handles, and a bold readable typeface. The new design was a success. By designing a food processor that could be used by consumers with arthritis and/or poor eyesight, Harrison had created a product that was accessible to people with a wide range of abilities. The Cuisinart food processor was extremely popular with the general public. This created new standards for new models of technology and machinery, making it accessible for all people to use.

=== The Red Cross ===
Harrison invented two prototype mobile blood-collecting systems for the Red Cross that changed the way of comforting donors of varying ages, sizes, and physical abilities by his accommodations and was later patented by the Red Cross in the 1970s. He was located in Boston’s Red Cross, and his students initiated a five-year project to research its projections on the nation. The work was to determine if the Red Cross blood programs have the ability for readily access various sites. They also had to use design technologies that accommodated donors of various ages, sizes, and physical abilities. The Red Cross patented the work of Harrison and is used throughout the country.

=== The ILZRO House ===
A five-year research and demonstration program inducted Harrison as project director. This was sponsored by the International Lead Zinc Research Organization (ILZRO). The goal of this project was building a demonstration house with experimental steel housing. ILZRO, awarded grants to RISD, the company Harrison worked for, to construct a house demonstrating their work of universal design, beginning in 1971 in Foster, Rhode Island. The experimental steel house explored building of new materials, accessibility for the disabled and nondisabled, as well as conserving all around energy. The house was a one story of 1,100 square feet. It was the most inclusive and accessible state-of-the-art house ever created during the time. They included design tactics of complete accessibility, for example light switches were lowered to door knob height and operated by palm or fist. Sinks were deeper, at six to seven inches deeper, ideal for people in wheelchairs. The island in the kitchen was wheelchair height at 31 inches. They designed the plumbing to also not hit the knees where a wheelchair would sit. Being inclusive to people of disabilities and non disabilities, it also included regular height counters as well. Sinks were six to seven inches deep with drains at the rear, allowing wheelchair users to get their knees under them without hitting plumbing. The ILZRO House was the first to have a completely inclusive house for people with disabilities and non disabilities. It was the complete ideal for the representation of Universal Design.

=== The Universal Kitchen ===
Harrison designed and advocated products for extreme accessibility and wanted people of all abilities to be able to use, including people with disabilities, the elderly as well as normal healthy people. This post-WWII era changed the game for years to come, as now there are much more accessible products and design methods anyone can use regardless if they have a disability or not. Towards the end of his life, Harrison became involved with a RISD project, the "Universal Kitchen" that embraced the concepts of universal design. The design study, undertaken by RISD students, analyzed every aspect of the kitchen in order to restructure it to meet the needs of varying abilities. Students documented each step in the process of cooking a meal in a conventional kitchen in order to develop a more efficient, time saving, and user-friendly model. Based on their findings, the students built a prototype "Universal Kitchen." Harrison died before the project was completed.
