= Nippon Light Metal =

Japanese public industrial holding company

Nippon Light Metal Holdings Company, Ltd.
- Company type: Public KK
- Traded as: TYO: 5703; OSE: 5703
- Industry: Non-ferrous metal; Chemicals
- Founded: March 30, 1939 (as Nippon Light Metal Company); October 1, 2012 (as holding company - Nippon Light Metal Holdings)
- Headquarters: 2-2-20 Higashi-shinagawa, Shinagawa-ku, Tokyo, Japan
- Key people: Takashi Ishiyama, (CEO and President)
- Products: Alumina and alumina products; Chemical products
- Revenue: ▼$ 3.954 billion USD (FY 2012) (¥ 371.88 billion JPY) (FY 2012)
- Net income: ▲$ 35.67 million USD (FY 2012) (¥ 3.35 billion JPY) (FY 2012)
- Number of employees: 10,392 (as of March 2013)
- Subsidiaries: Nippon Light Metal Company, Ltd.; Toyo Aluminium K.K.; Nippon Fruehauf Co., Ltd.; Nikkeikin Kakoh Kaihatsu Holdings Co., Ltd.; Nikkei MC Aluminium Co., Ltd.; Nikkei Panel System Co., Ltd.; Toyo Aluminium Ekco Products Co., Ltd.; Tokai Aluminum Foil Co., Ltd.; Toyo Aluminum Chiba K.K.; Shandong Conglin Fruehauf Automobile Co., Ltd.; Toyo Aluminum Chiba K.K.; Nikkeikin Aluminium Core Technology Co., Ltd.; Riken Light Metal Industrial Co., Ltd.; Nikkei Extrusions Co., Ltd.
- Website: Official website

Nippon Light Metal Holdings Company, Ltd. (日本軽金属ホールディングス株式会社, Nihon Keikinzoku Hōrudingusu Kabushiki Kaisha) is a Japanese multinational public industrial holding company that through its subsidiaries is mainly engaged in the manufacture and sale of aluminum and chemical products. It is listed on the Tokyo Stock Exchange and is a constituent of the Nikkei 225.

In 1939 Nippon Light Metal Co. was incorporated jointly by Furukawa Electric and Tokyo Dento (one of the predecessors of the Tokyo Electric Power Company) to start the aluminum smelting and in 2012 Nippon Light Metal Holdings Co., a pure holding company for the former, was established.

== Business segments and products ==
The Company operates in four business segments:

- Aluminum Ingot and Chemicals
  - alumina, aluminum hydroxide, chemical goods, aluminum bullion, aluminum alloys
- Aluminum Sheet and Extrusions
  - aluminum sheets and aluminum extrusion products
- Fabricated Products and Others
  - processed aluminum products including electronic materials, industrial components, landscape related products
  - transportation-related products including van, truck and trailer bodies, automobile parts
  - panels for freezers and refrigerators, solar panel frames, electrode sheets for aluminum electrolytic capacitors, aluminum kegs, panels for clean rooms as well as carbon products (carbon blocks); this once included the Donvier ice cream maker
- Aluminum Foil, Powder and Paste
  - aluminum foil for electrolytic capacitors, antennas for IC cards/tags
  - solar panel backsheets, conductive inks for solar cell electrodes
