= Carl Sontheimer =

American inventor and engineer

Carl G. Sontheimer (1914 – 23 March 1998) was an American inventor and engineer best known for creating the original Cuisinart food processor.

Sontheimer was born in New York City but raised in France. He returned to the U.S. to attend the Massachusetts Institute of Technology (MIT), where he received an engineering degree. Before developing the food processor in the early 1970s, he had a career that included work at RCA and Maguire Industries. He invented a number of other devices, including a microwave-based direction finder used during NASA's moon program. He founded and sold two electronics companies, one became Trak Electronics. Sontheimer sold his stake in Trak and started Anzac Electronics to develop and manufacture microwave systems. He sold Anzac by 1966, but continued as a consultant for three years.

His food processor was based on a commercial one produced by a major French restaurant supplier, the Robot-Coupe invented by Pierre Verdon. Sontheimer refined and improved it to create the Cusinart which debuted in 1973. He and his wife sold the Cuisinart company to an investment group in 1987 for $42 million. The company is now owned by Conair.

Sontheimer died on 26 March 1998 in a hospital near his home in Greenwich, Connecticut.
