= Cruet-stand =

Stand for holding condiment containers

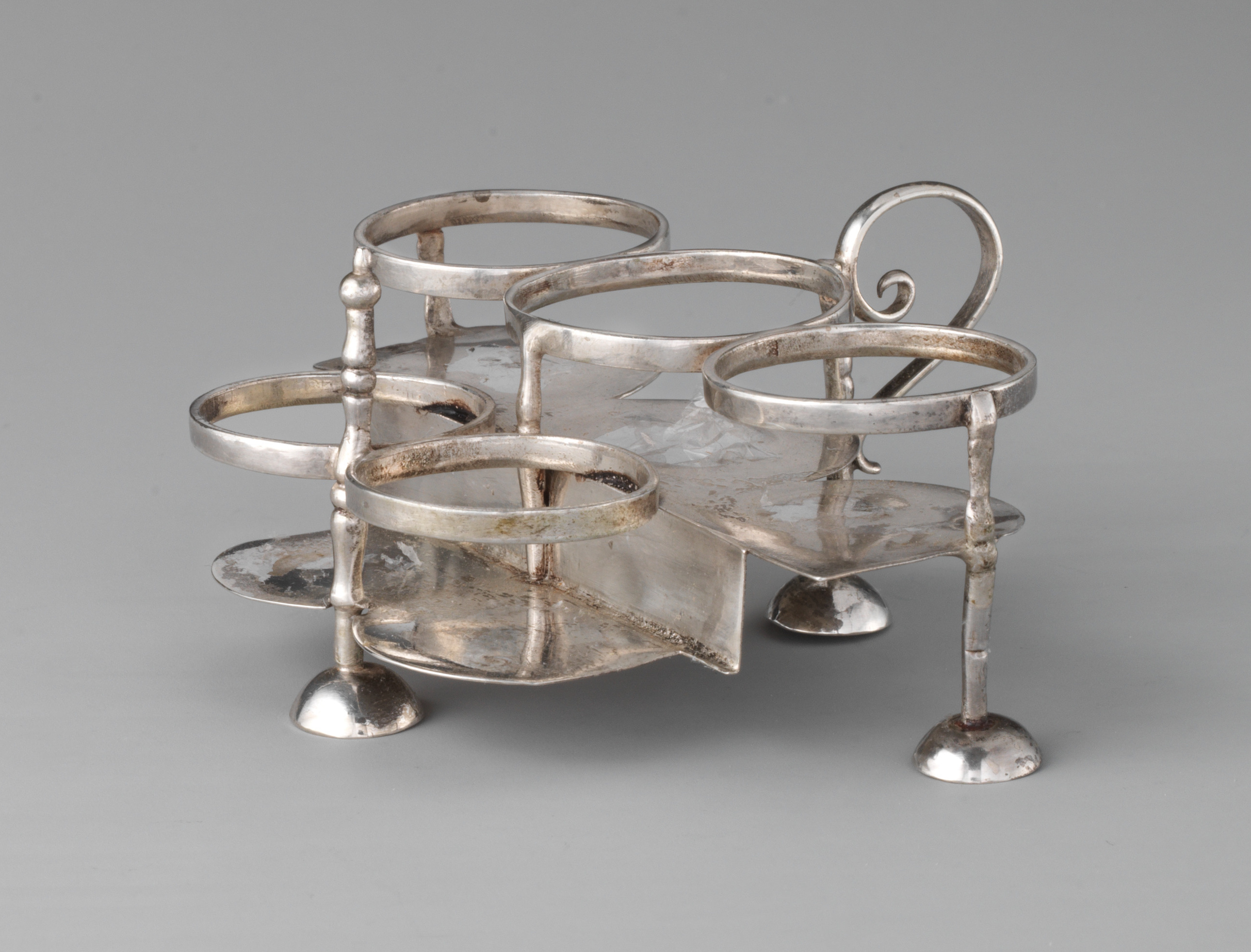
Silver cruet stand (1720-23)

A cruet-stand (or cruet in British English) is a small stand of metal, ceramic, or glass which holds containers for condiments. Typically these include salt and pepper shakers, and often cruets or bottles of vinegar and olive oil. The stand and containers form a cruet set.

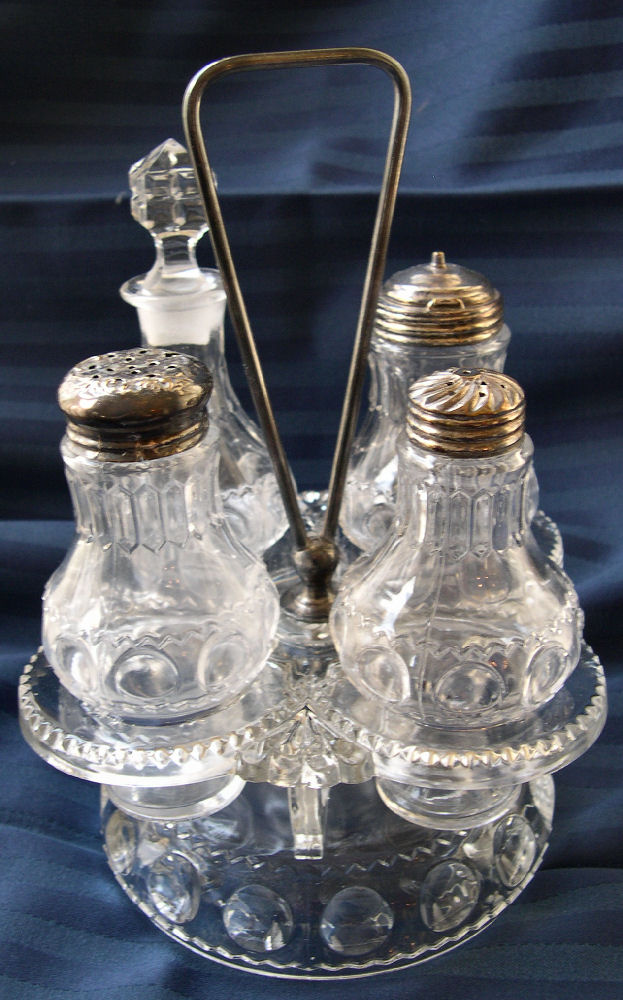
A crystal cruet set, c.1930s/40s

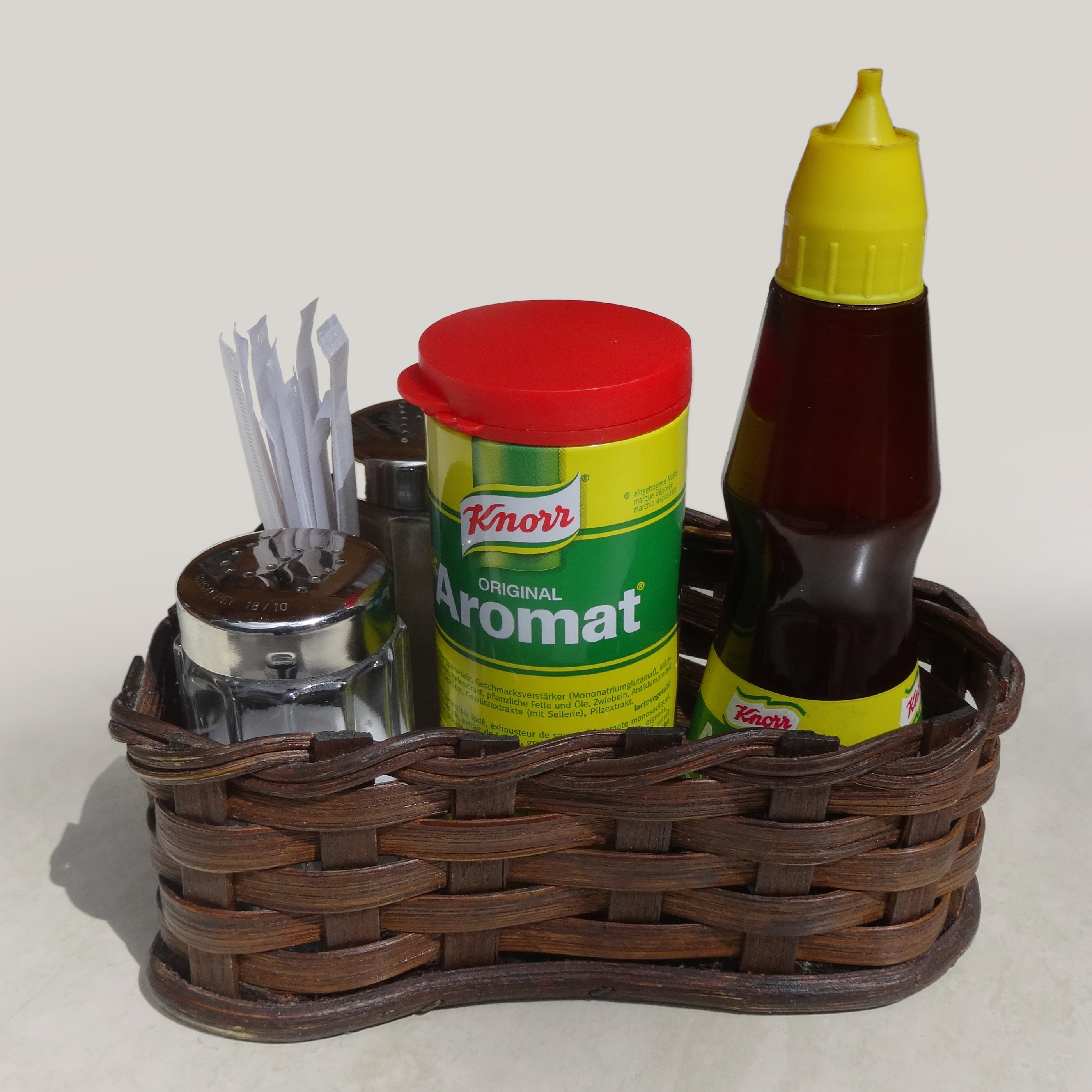
A modern cruet set
