= Salt and pepper shakers =

Condiment dispensers

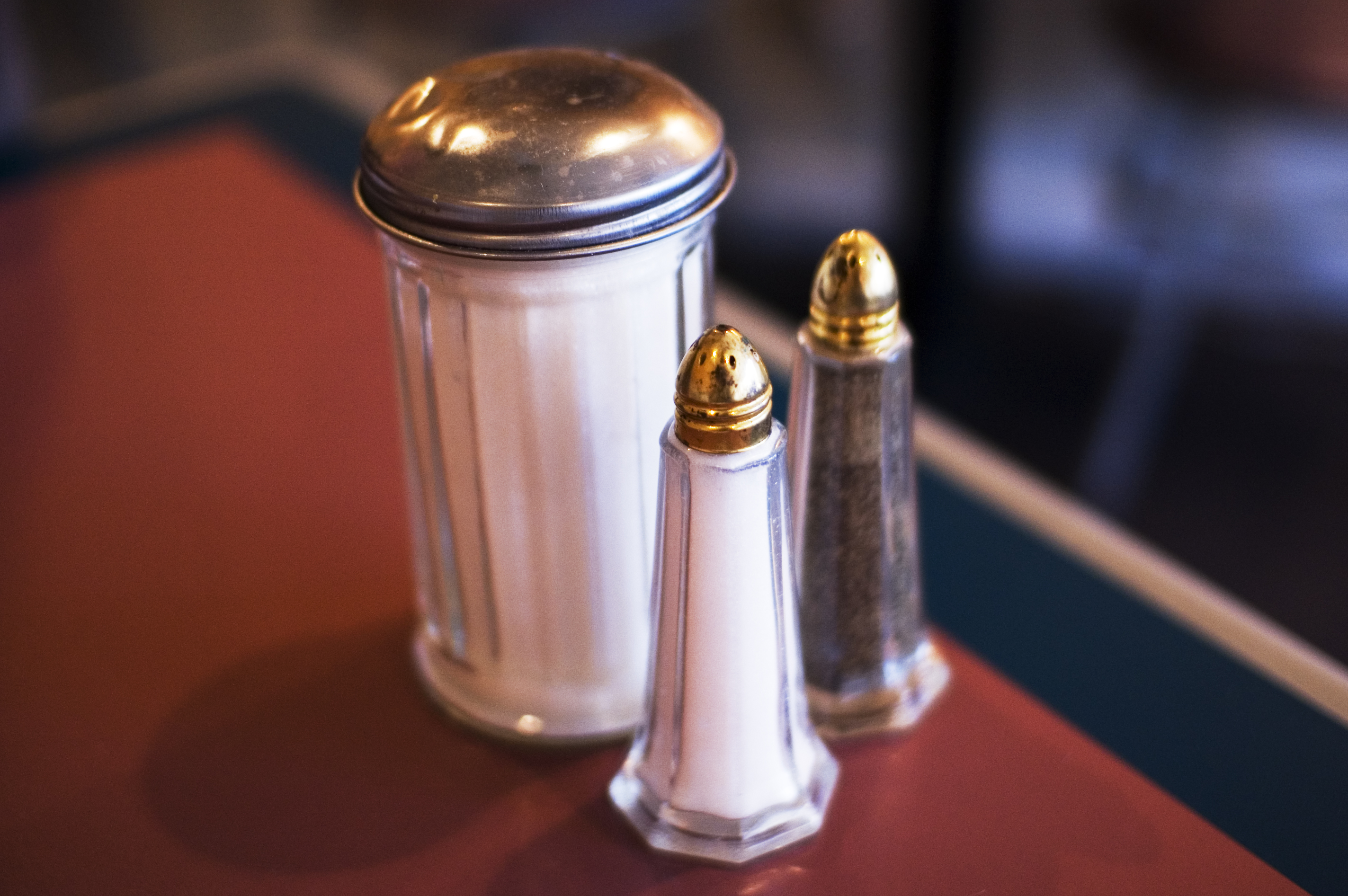
Salt and pepper shakers, along with a sugar dispenser

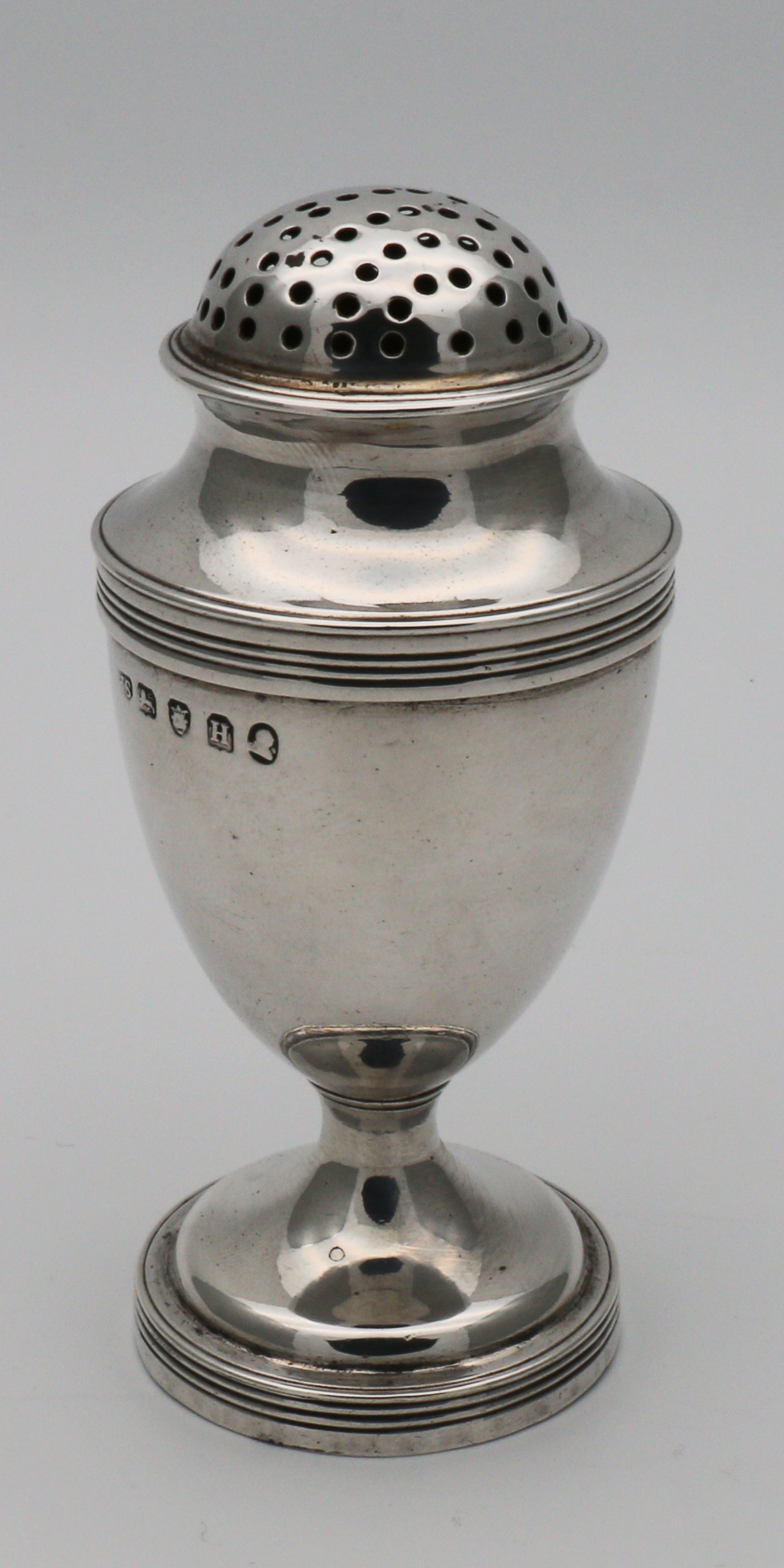
Georgian era silver pepper shaker, or pepperette, hallmarked London 1803

Salt and pepper shakers or salt and pepper pots, of which the first item can also be called a salt cellar in British English, are condiment dispensers used in European cuisine that are designed to allow diners to distribute grains of edible salt and ground black pepper. Salt and pepper shakers are sometimes held in a cruet-stand.

== History and usage ==
Salt and pepper shakers can be made from a variety of materials, including plastic, glass, metal, and ceramic.

Early cruet-stands included three shakers, one each for salt and pepper and a third whose exact purpose is now unknown. The leading explanation is that the third shaker was used for ground mustard. Over time this third shaker declined from prominence.

An 1872 newspaper stated: "A pepper-box for salt is the latest Yankee invention."

Salt shakers became increasingly common after anti-caking agents were introduced by the Morton Salt company in 1911. The Great Depression of the 1930s boosted the popularity of salt and pepper shakers as global ceramics producers concentrated on inexpensive items.

Except in the most casual dining establishments, they are usually provided as a matched set, sometimes distinguishable only by the number of holes on the top of the shaker. Designs range from small, plain glass screw cap containers (invented by John Landis Mason, inventor of the Mason jar) to more ornate works of art. Sometimes the design refers to some pair of related objects—such as a replica of a West Highland White Terrier containing salt and a Scottish Terrier containing pepper. Designs may also relate to specific occasions or holidays. As a result of this diversity of design, collecting salt and pepper shakers is a hobby. Design of salt and pepper shakers has also been used to transmit cultural perspectives about race and other cultural values.

Two Museums of Salt and Pepper Shakers in the US and Spain are dedicated to showing the variety and history of salt and pepper shakers through the ages. Żupny Castle in Poland also contains a collection of salt shakers.

== Distinguishing salt from pepper ==
The number of holes varies by culture, health, and taste. In the United States, where excessive salt is considered unhealthy, salt is stored in the shaker with the fewer holes, but in parts of Europe where pepper was historically a rare spice, this is reversed. In the UK, salt was often poured onto the side of one's plate and used for dipping, rather than shaken across the whole dish, hence salt cellars having a single, larger, hole.

The shakers may also be simply labelled "pepper" and "salt" or "p" and "s" (in some cases the latter may be formed of the holes for pouring), or may be colored white for salt and black for pepper. Many salt and pepper shakers are transparent, in which case they need not be otherwise distinguished.

As an alternative to salt and pepper shakers, pepper may be distributed at the table by use of a pepper grinder, while salt may be distributed from a salt cellar or a salt mill.

== See also ==
- Salt pig, a related dispenser
