= Donvier =

Japanese brand of ice cream makers

Donvier is a brand of popular Japanese-made ice cream makers, originally produced by Nippon Light Metal and distributed in the United States by Virginia Beach, Virginia-based Nikkal Industries from 1984 to 1990, and currently manufactured and sold by Browne & Co. under their Cuisipro brand. Although they now only make replacement parts for the lid and handle.

The ice cream maker consists of a cylindrical metal tub (with refrigerant sealed inside) that is frozen overnight. An accompanying hand crank is then used to turn a paddle that makes ice cream from a mixture within the tub.

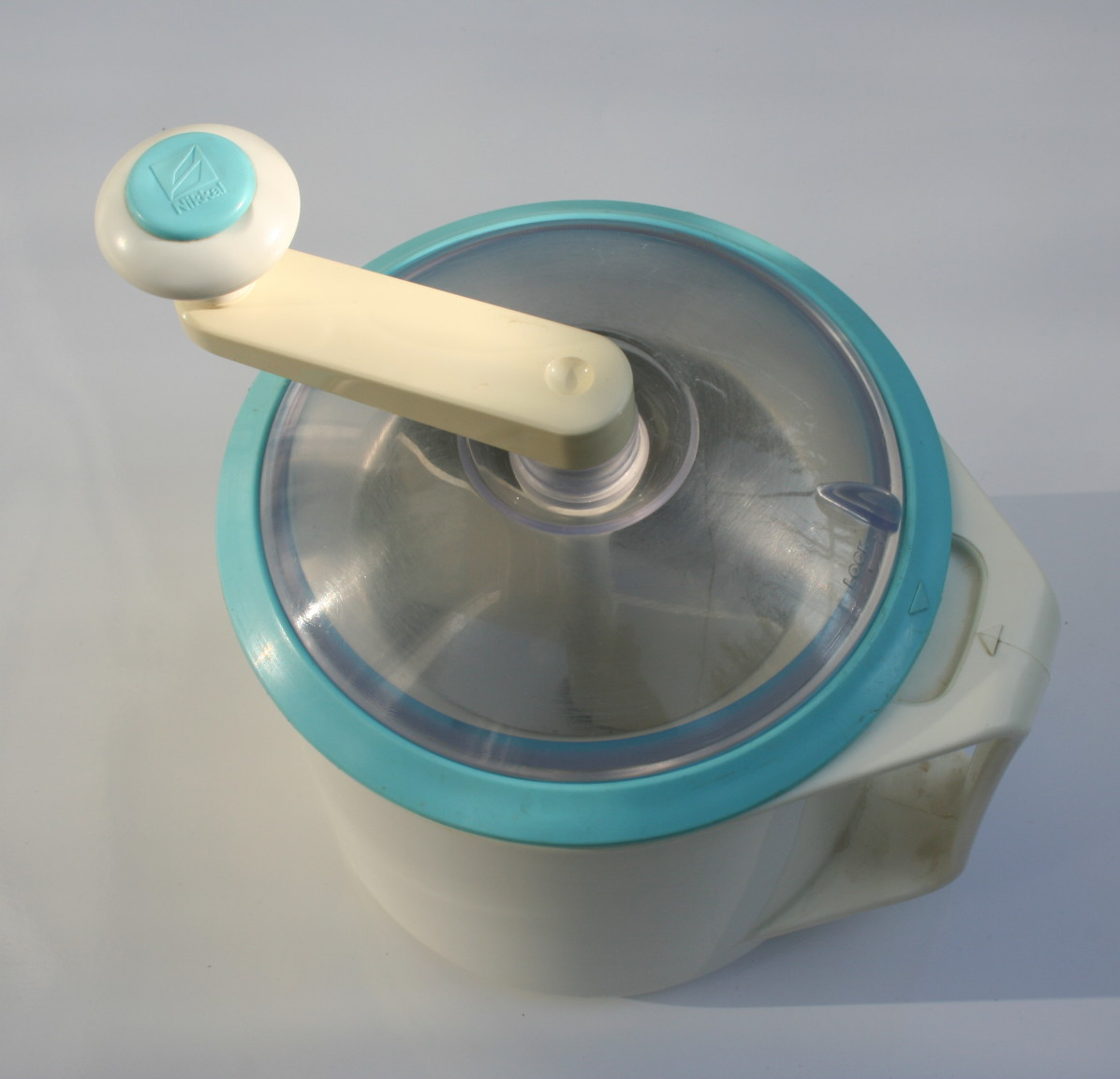
