= Yugoslav cuisine =

Yugoslav cuisine or Yugoslavian cuisine may be covered in the following articles:

- Bosnia and Herzegovina cuisine
- Croatian cuisine
- Kosovan cuisine
- Macedonian cuisine
- Montenegrin cuisine
- Serbian cuisine
- Slovenian cuisine
