= Food processor =

Home appliance

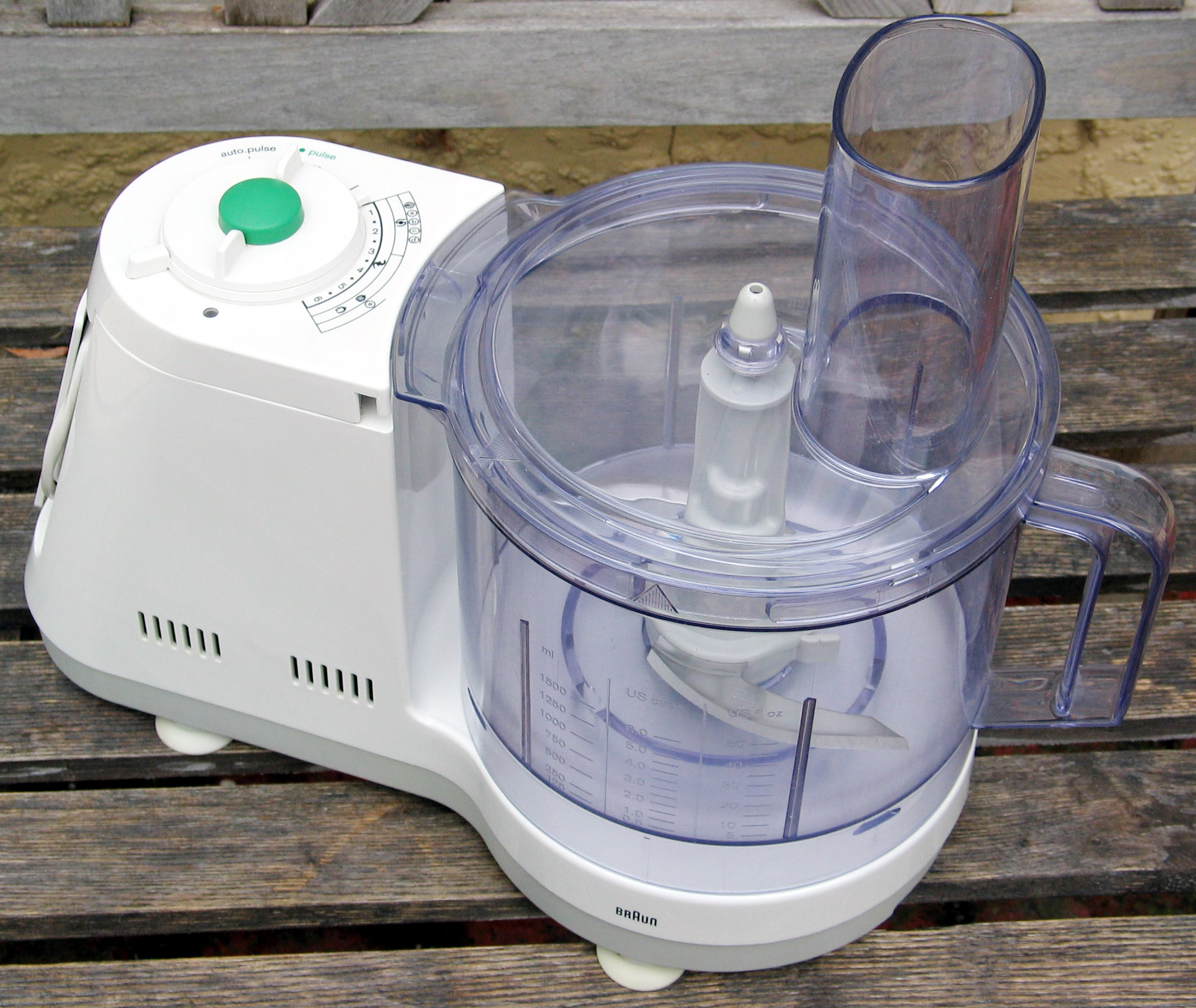
An electric food processor

A food processor is a kitchen appliance used to facilitate repetitive tasks in the preparation of food. Today, the term almost always refers to an electric-motor-driven appliance, although there are some manual devices also referred to as "food processors".

Food processors are similar to blenders in many forms. A food processor typically requires little to no liquid during use, and even its finely chopped products retain some texture. A blender, however, requires some liquid for the blade to properly blend the food, and its output is more liquid. Food processors are used to blend, chop, dice, and slice, allowing for quicker meal preparation.

== History ==
One of the first electric food processors was the Starmix, introduced by German company Electrostar in 1946. Although the basic unit resembled a simple blender, numerous accessories were available, including attachments for slicing bread, milk centrifuges and ice cream bowls. In a time when electric motors were expensive, they also developed the piccolo, where the food processor's base unit could drive a vacuum cleaner. In the 1960s, Albrecht von Goertz designed the Starmix MX3 food processor.

In France, the concept of a machine to process food began when a catering company salesman, Pierre Verdon, observed the large amount of time his clients spent in the kitchen chopping, shredding and mixing. He produced a simple but effective solution, a bowl with a revolving blade in the base. In 1960, this evolved into Robot-Coupe, a company established to manufacture commercial "food processors" for the catering industry. In the late 1960s, a commercial food processor driven by a powerful commercial induction motor was produced. Robot-Coupe's Magimix food processor arrived from France in the UK in 1974, beginning with the Model 1800. Then, a UK company Kenwood Limited started their own first Kenwood Food Processor, 'processor de- luxe,' in 1979.

=== Marc Harrison's Cuisinart Re-design ===
Disability research was an ongoing project because the first food processor created was not user friendly for all individuals. In 1978, Marc Harrison was a professor at the Rhode Island School of Design. He specialized in Industrial Design. Cuisinart, an American company, contacted and hired Harrison in 1978 to update the Food Processor. Harrison updated the product to focus on making the machine usable for those with limited abilities with fine motor skills and eyesight, which in turn made it easier for any user to operate. These updates included larger writing on the base of the product to benefit those who have vision impairments, and larger handles and buttons. These updates were created so that the food processor could be accessible for all users.

In 1980, the USSR began producing food processors of the Mriya model (consisting of an electric motor with a gearbox and six replaceable attachments - a meat grinder, coffee grinder, mixer, juicer, vegetable chopper, etc.).

== Functions ==
Food processors normally have multiple functions, depending on the placement and type of attachment or blade. Some of the more challenging tasks include kneading stiff doughs, chopping raw carrots, and shredding a hard cheese, which may require a more powerful motor. The standard accessory for chopping is called the knife blade or sometimes just blade. They often also come with a shredding and slicing blades. Accessories such as blender and juicer attachments may allow a food processor to perform the duties of other appliances.

== See also ==
- Blade grinder – Machine with spinning blade, such as a food processor
- Blender (appliance) – Kitchen appliance used to crush food or make liquid
- Bread machine – Type of home appliance for baking bread
- Coffee grinder – Mill used to grind hard food products between two burrs
- Domestic robot – Type of service robot
- Donvier – Japanese brand of ice cream makers
- Food processing – Transformation of raw ingredients into food products
- Grater – Tool to grate something
- Mandoline – Culinary utensil used for slicing food
- Multicooker – Multi use electric pot cooking appliance
- Pressure cooker – Device for preparing food
- Sonication – Application of sound energy
- Stand mixer
