= Burr mill =

Mill used to grind hard food products between two burrs

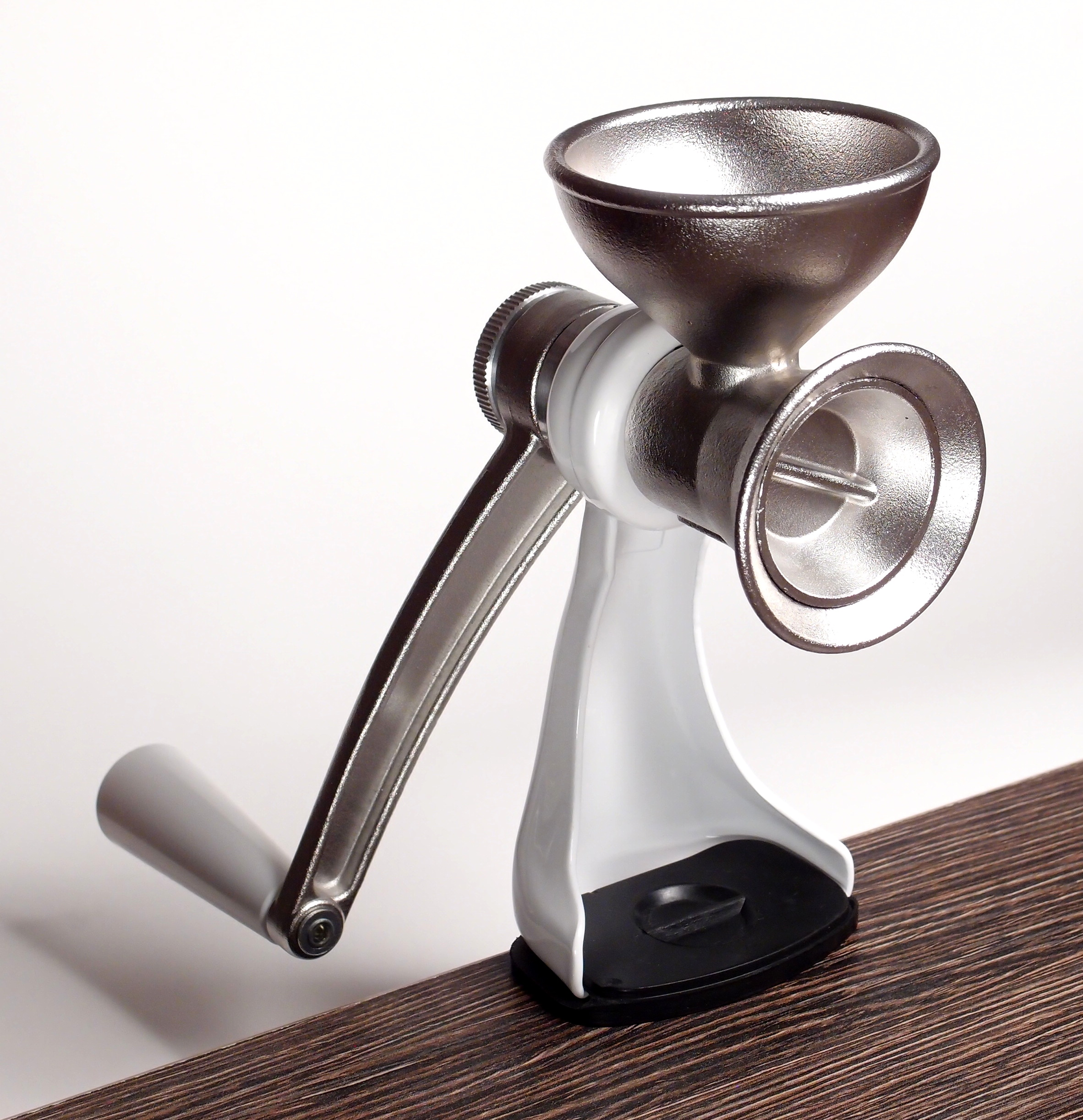
Burr grinder for poppy seeds, burr visible on front

A burr mill, or burr grinder, is a mill used to grind hard, small food products between two revolving abrasive surfaces separated by a distance usually set by the user. When the two surfaces are set far apart, the resulting ground material is coarser, and when the two surfaces are set closer together, the resulting ground material is finer and smaller. Often, the device includes a revolving screw that pushes the food through. It may be powered electrically or manually.

Burr mills do not heat the ground product by friction as much as blade grinders ("choppers"), and produce particles of a uniform size determined by the separation between the grinding surfaces.

Food burr mills are typically designed for a specific purpose, such as grinding coffee beans, dried peppercorns, coarse salt, various spices, or poppy seeds as an example. Coffee mills for volume consumption are usually powered by electric motors, but fast and precise manual mills have experienced an uptick in popularity in the 2020s for individual-serving pour-over and espresso. Domestic pepper, salt, and spice mills, used to sprinkle a little seasoning on food, are usually operated manually, sometimes by a battery-powered motor.

== Coffee grinders ==
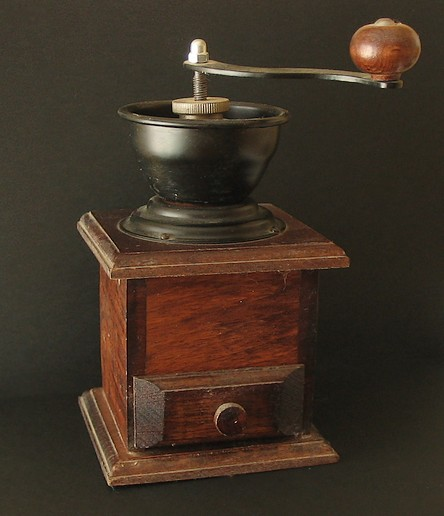
Traditional manual coffee grinder

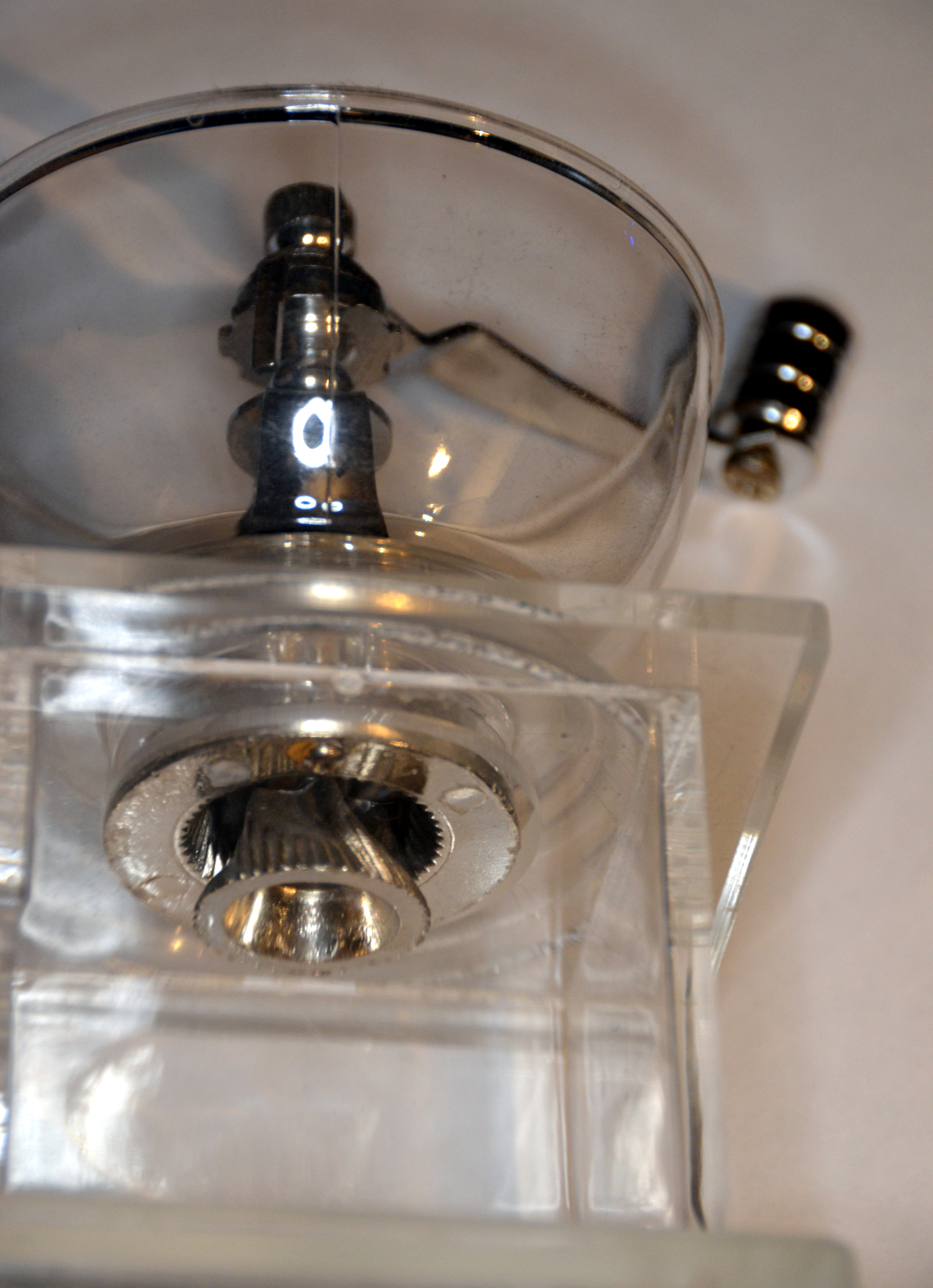
Burr mill mechanism inside a mechanical coffee grinder

The uniform particle size and variable settings of a burr grinder make it well-suited for coffee preparation, as different methods of coffee preparation require different size grinds. The size of the grind is determined by the separation between the two burrs, into which the coffee beans fall and are ground a few at a time. A finer grind allows a larger surface area to come into contact with the water, which yields a more complete extraction of caffeine and flavor. The grind spectrum ranges from Turkish coffee and espresso on the finer end to a French press, Karlsbad coffee and cold brew extraction on the coarse/extra coarse end, with pour-overs and drip coffee in the medium-fine to medium range. Blade mills are also used, but produce an undesirable wide range of particle sizes.

Burr coffee grinders can keep the flavor and aroma of the coffee beans intact if they operate at relatively low rotational speeds, producing less heat from friction than faster grinders and blade mills; "The oils and aromas can easily dissipate if the beans become too hot during grinding, although most grinders will not heat the beans to a high enough temperature to risk this occurring."

Electrically powered burr grinders obtain these lower speeds and even grind through two mechanisms. Lower-cost models generally use a small electric motor to drive a series of reduction gears, while heavy-duty commercial grinders use "direct drive", a large motor and a belt rather than gear reduction to spin the burrs. The reduction gear versions are noisier and usually do not have the lifespan of the direct drive units.

Electrically powered burr grinders are available in many variations. Some grinders allow fineness of grind to be adjusted in discrete steps, marked with numbers to allow a particular setting to be repeated, while stepless varieties use a worm drive or other mechanism to provide continuous variation without jumps between steps. Commercial grinders may include a doser, a catch bin to collect the ground coffee and release a specified amount at a time; doserless versions deliver the ground coffee into a container, which may be an espresso machine portafilter. Doserless grinders may implement weight-based or advance time-based grinding to deliver the right amount of coffee for an espresso shot or other beverage in a coffeehouse.

Manual coffee grinders have been largely supplanted by electrically powered ones for speed and convenience. Manual grinders, usually but not always less costly than electric models, continue in occasional use for cost, convenience, size, and aesthetic reasons. The powder-fine grind required for Turkish coffee cannot be achieved in an inexpensive home electric grinder without overstraining the motor and potentially damaging the plastic gears, or in a simple manual grinder; special precise manual grinders, often costly, are used.

== Manual grinders ==
Manual burr grinders are turned by hand, rotating one grinding surface against the other. Most grinders can be adjusted to set the fineness of grind. Coffee mills usually have a handle, providing leverage for the many turns required to grind enough coffee for a cup. The ground coffee is collected in a container which is part of the mill.

Salt, peppercorn, and spice mills are functionally similar to coffee mills, but differ in detail for the smaller spice particles, and usually do not have a handle, the entire top rotating instead as only a few turns are required to grind enough. The ground product falls directly onto the food being seasoned; the mill has no container. A few designs have abrasive surfaces which do not rotate but are moved against each other by squeezing a pair of handles. Many hard spices are available in inexpensive disposable containers incorporating a simple cone burr grinder.

Manual mills can be used for grinding other food products than they are intended for, but mills designed for pepper grinding are inappropriate for producing finely-ground flour. Laura Ingalls Wilder's novel The Long Winter describes a family grinding wheat in a coffee mill to make flour during months of hardship. In Giants in the Earth, Ole Edvart Rølvaag also described settlers in South Dakota using such mills to grind wheat during the same long, harsh winter (p. 427, 428).

The first coffee grinder was made by Richard Dearmann, an English blacksmith from Birmingham, in 1799. This grinder was widely distributed in the US, where Increase Wilson patented the first wall coffee grinder in 1818.

Peugeot of France patented a pepper grinder in 1842. The mechanism of case-hardened steel cracked the peppercorns before the actual grinding process. The grooves on the Peugeot mechanism were individually cut into the metal and then case-hardened, making them very durable. The company has since grown and extended its business to other culinary tools, tools, bicycles, cars and motocycles. Peugeot still manufactures 2.5 million grinders per year in France, exported worldwide.

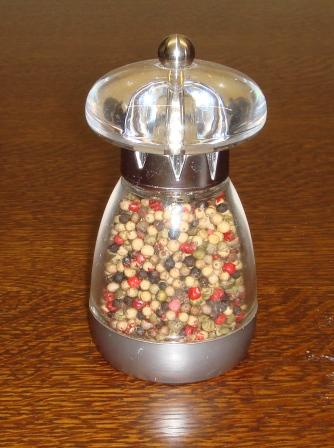
A pepper mill

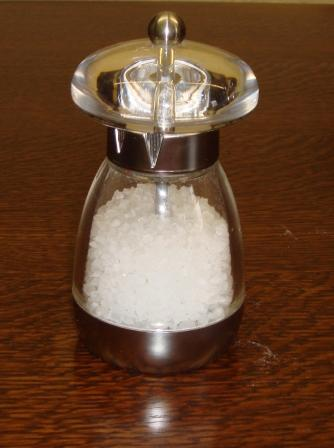
A salt mill

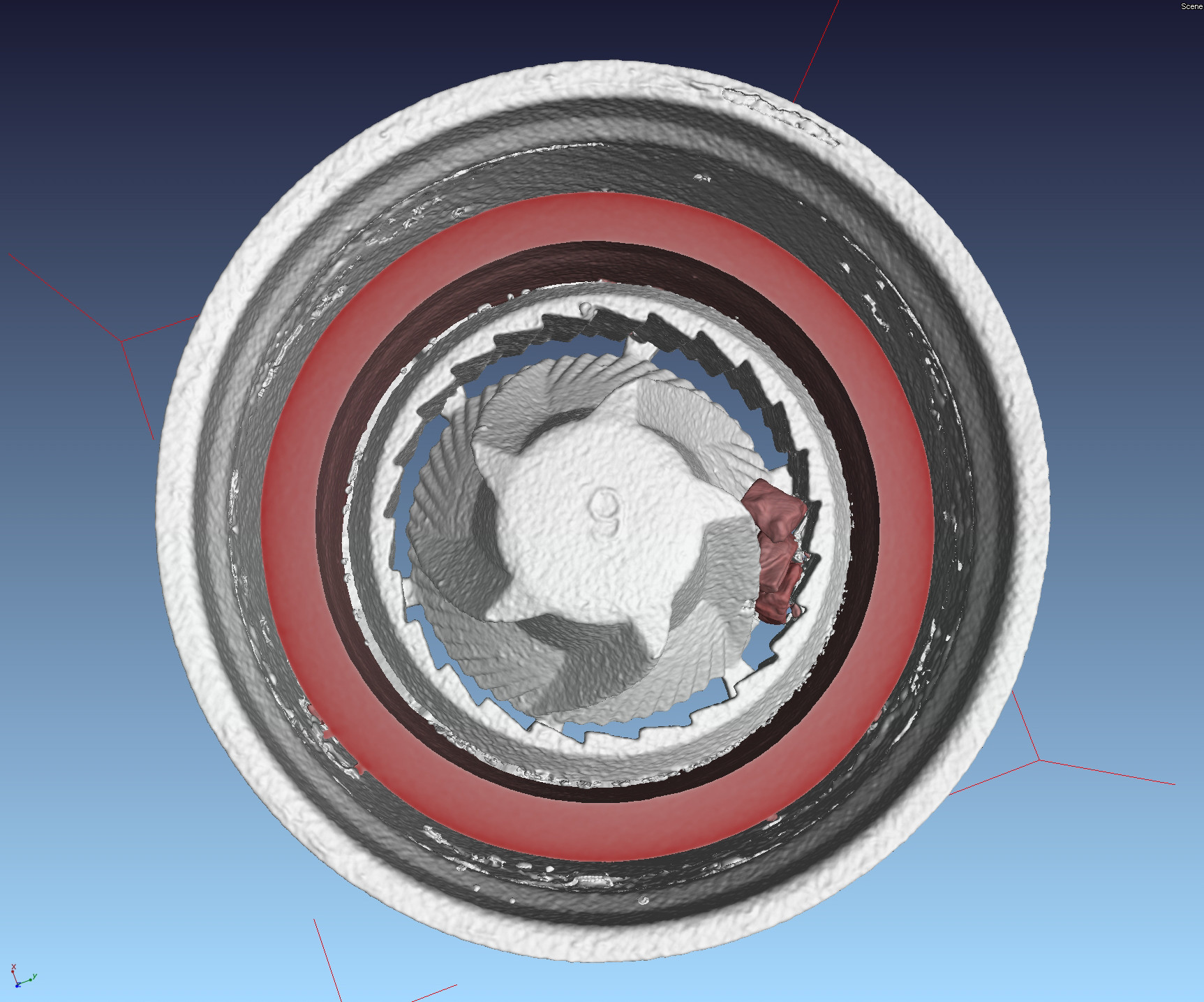
Grinding gear from a disposable salt mill, computed tomography image

Flight through a 3D reconstruction of a disposable pepper grinder, from CT-data

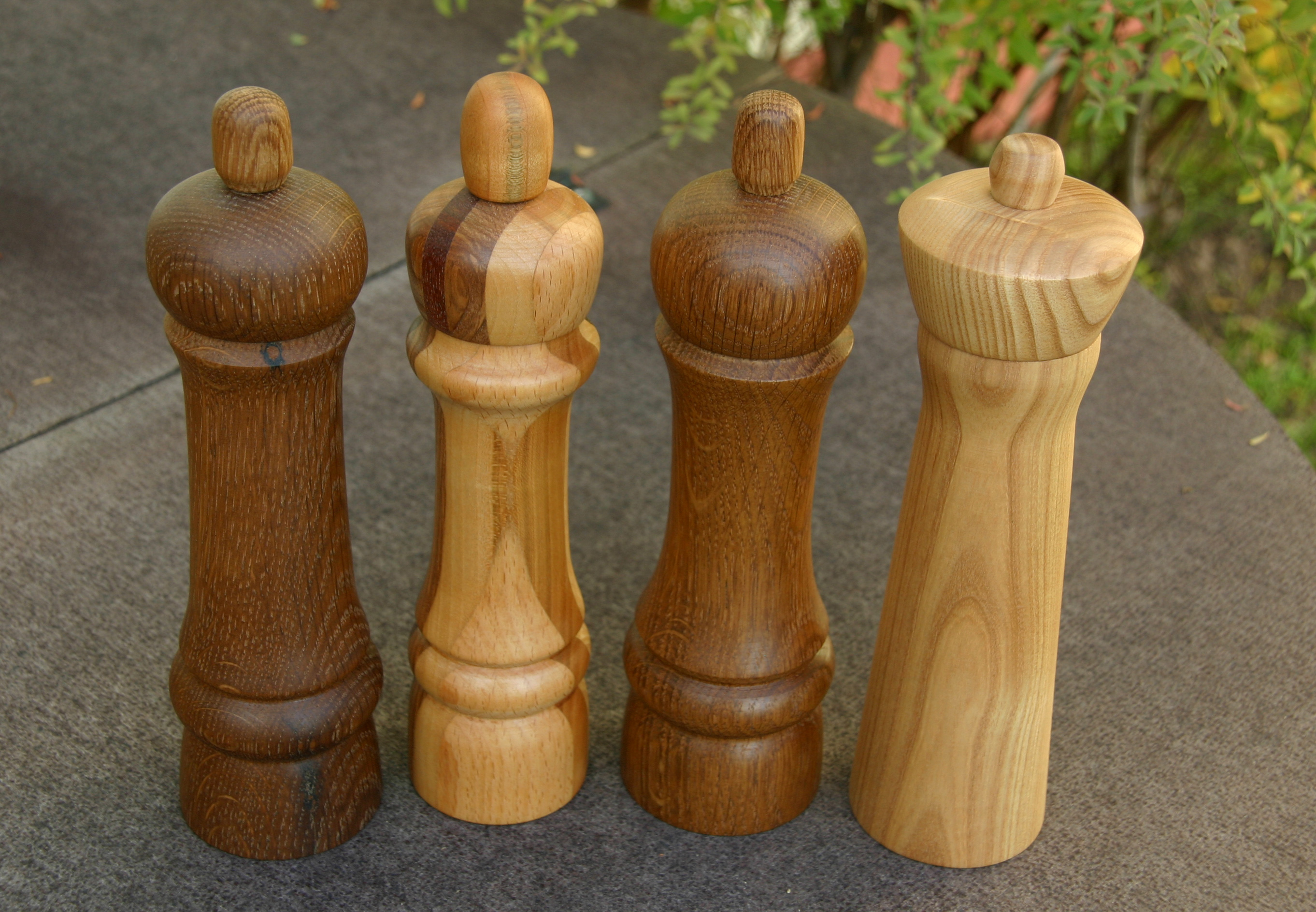
Wooden manual pepper mills from Germany

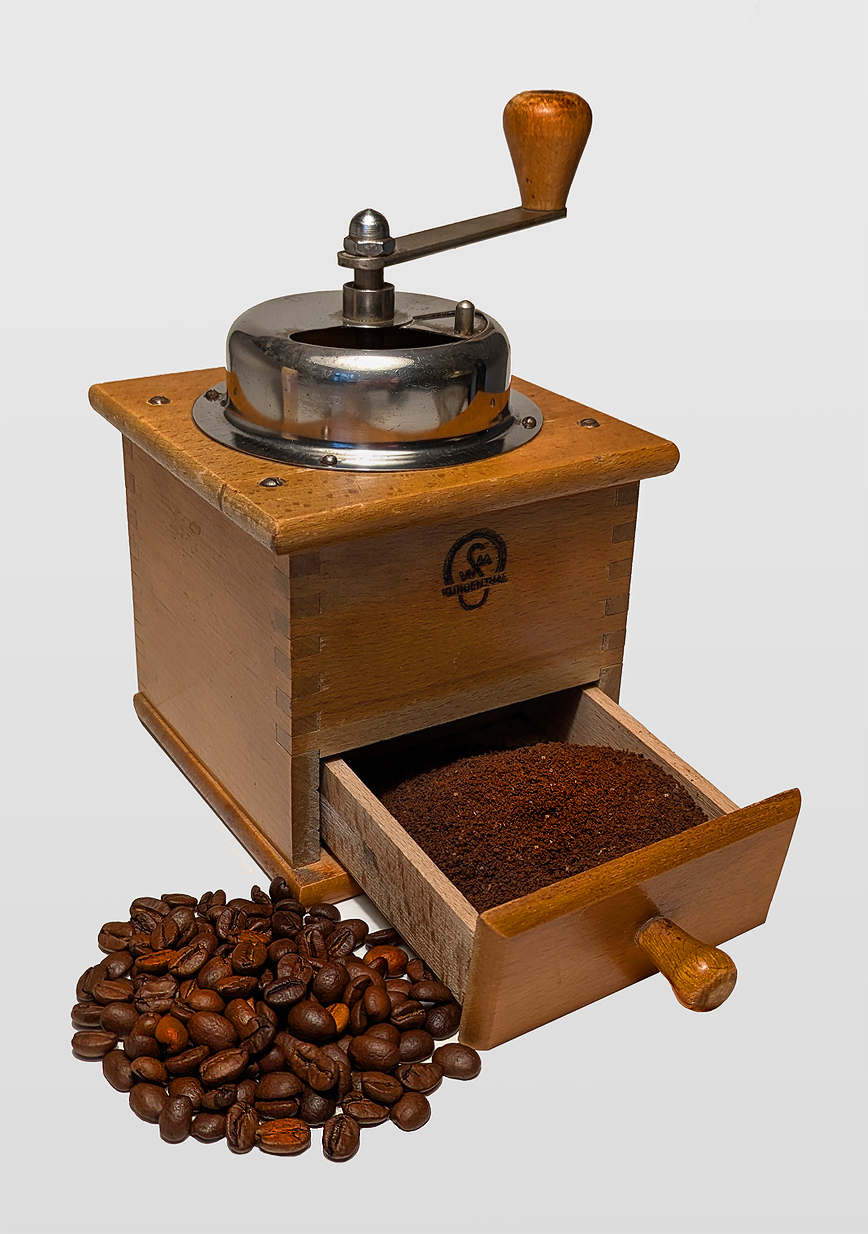
Coffee grinder from the German manufacturer Klingenthall.

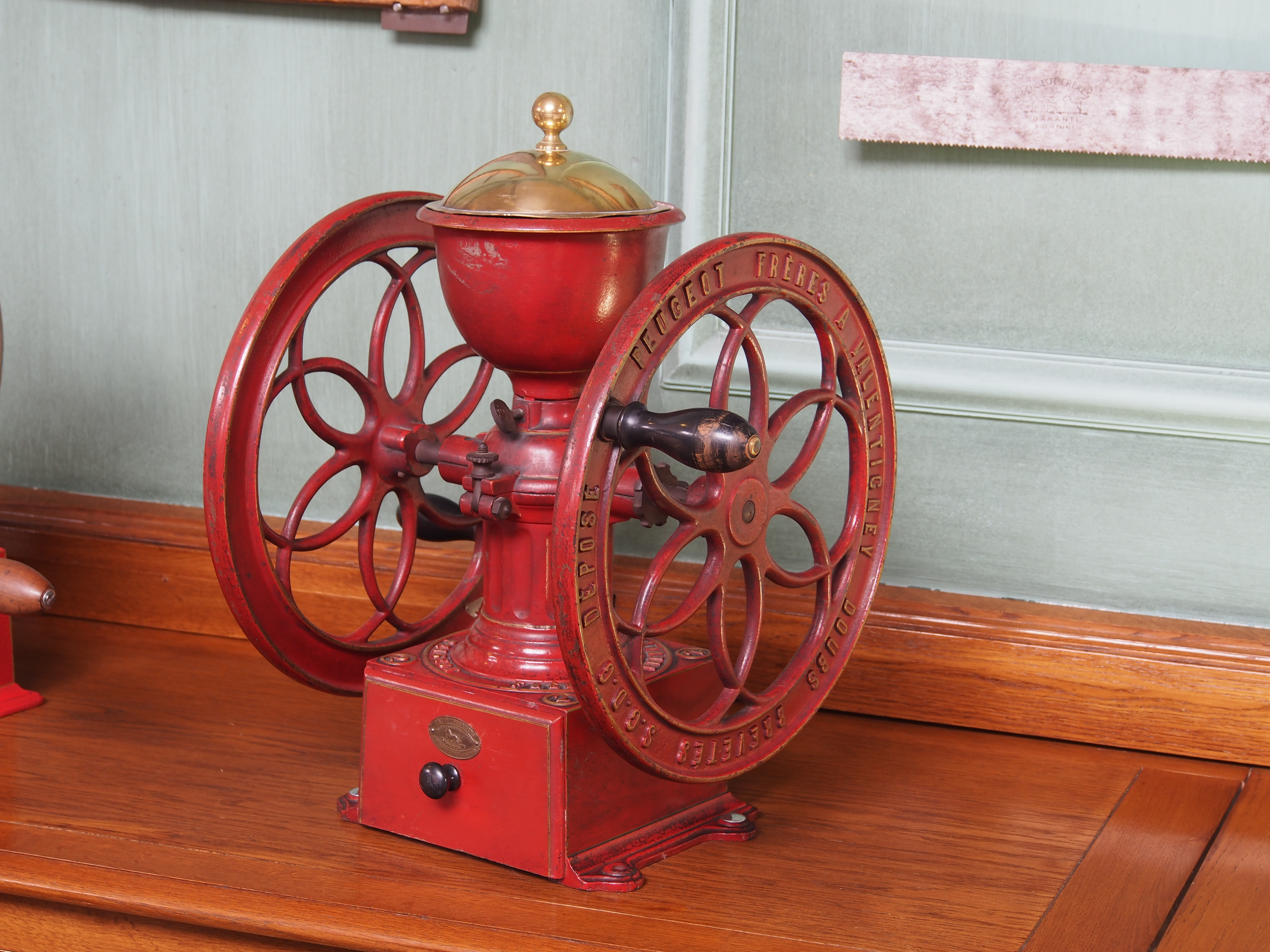
Antique Peugeot coffee grinder.

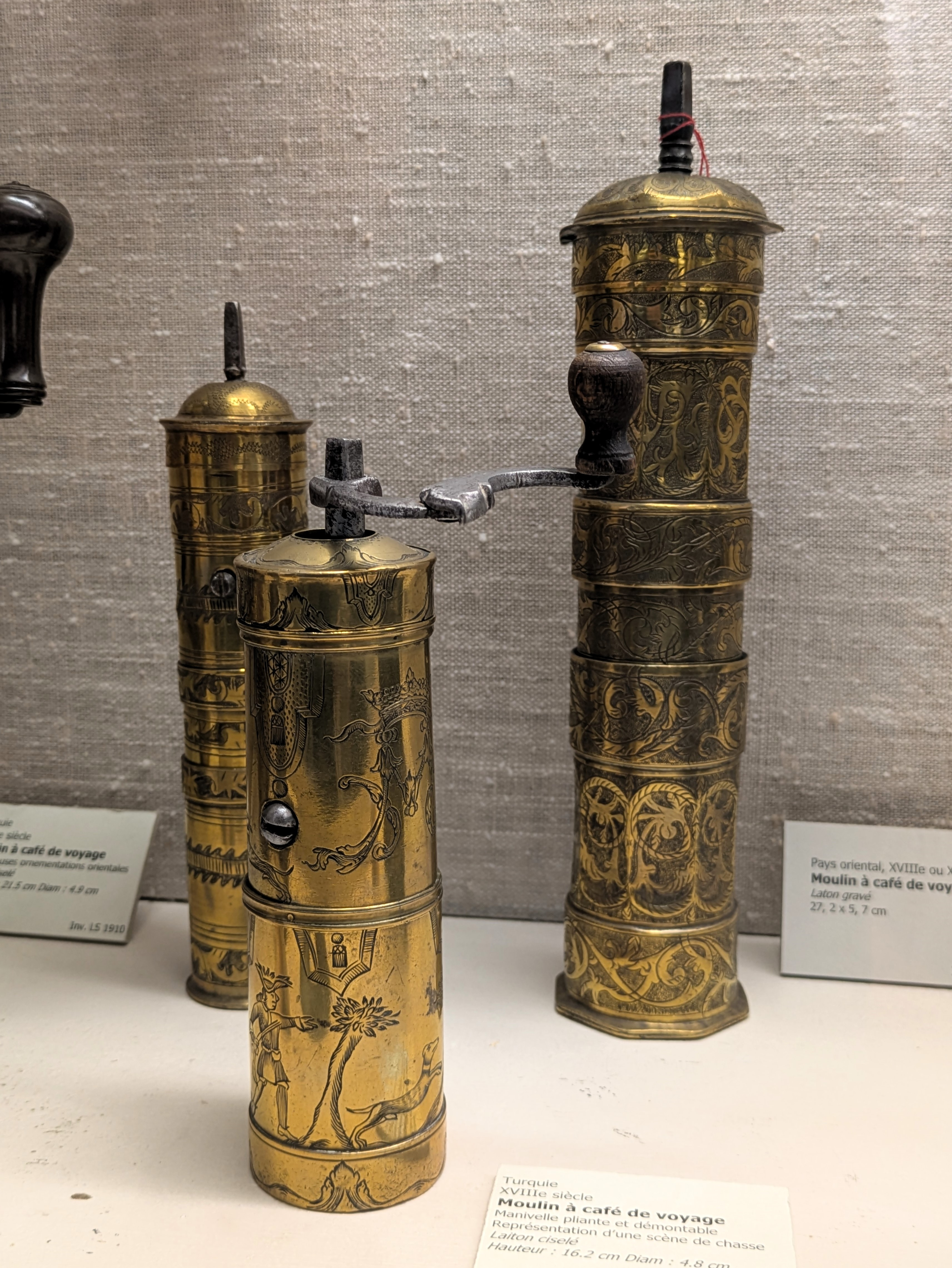
Traditional Turkish coffee grinders, to grind coffee to fine powder.

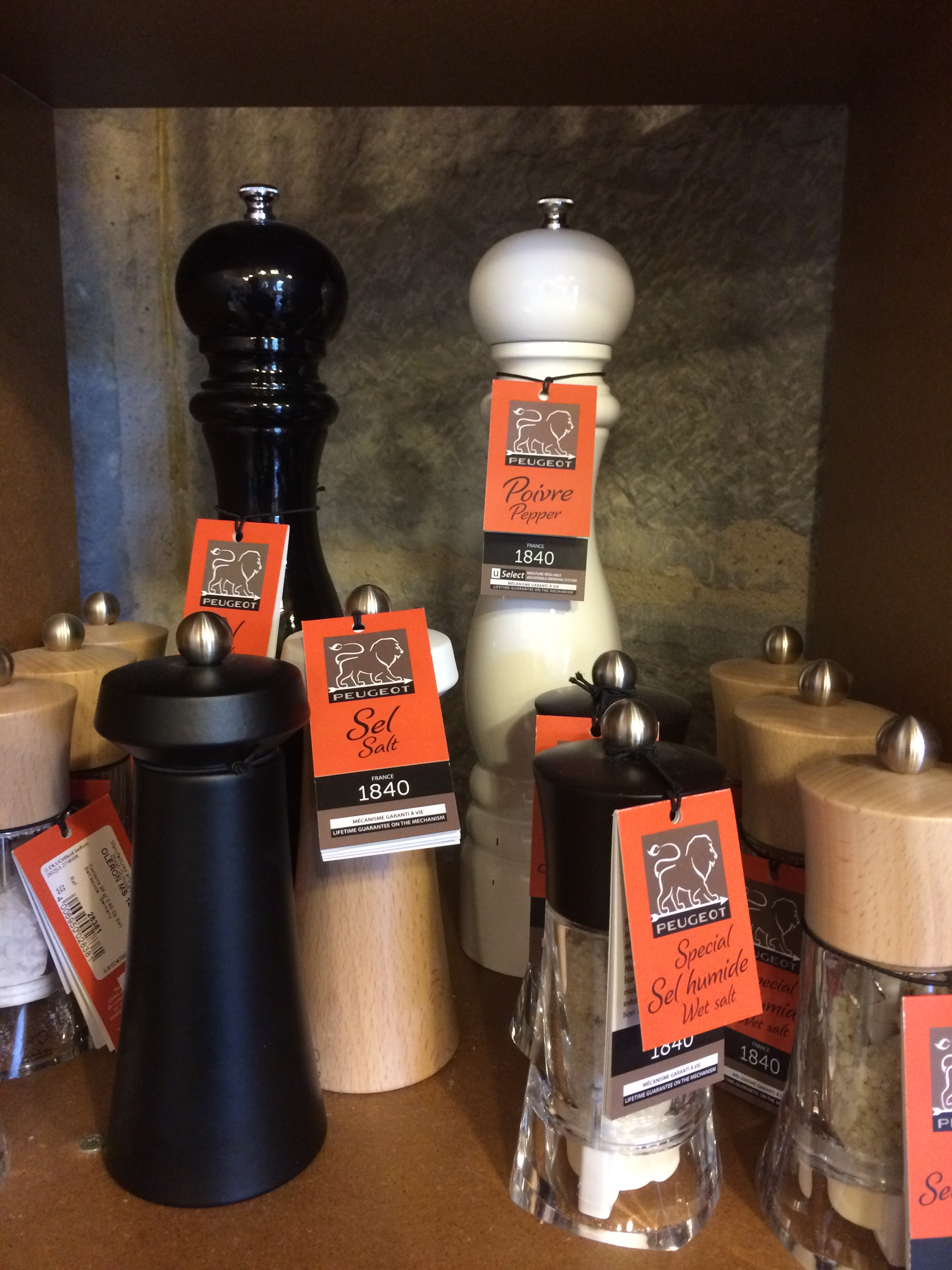
Modern Peugeot pepper or salt grinders.

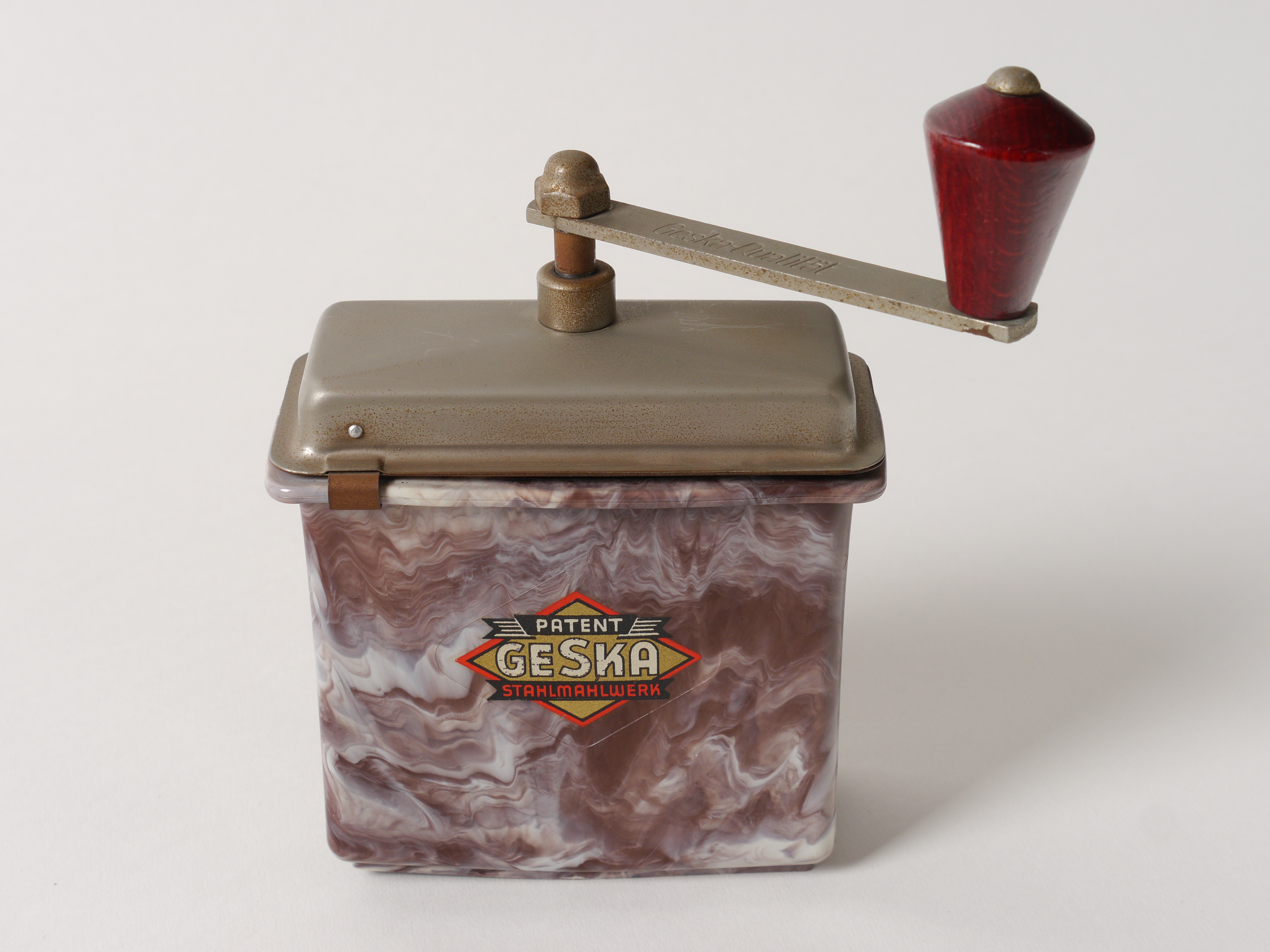
Geska manual coffee grinder, collection Museum of Industry Ghent.

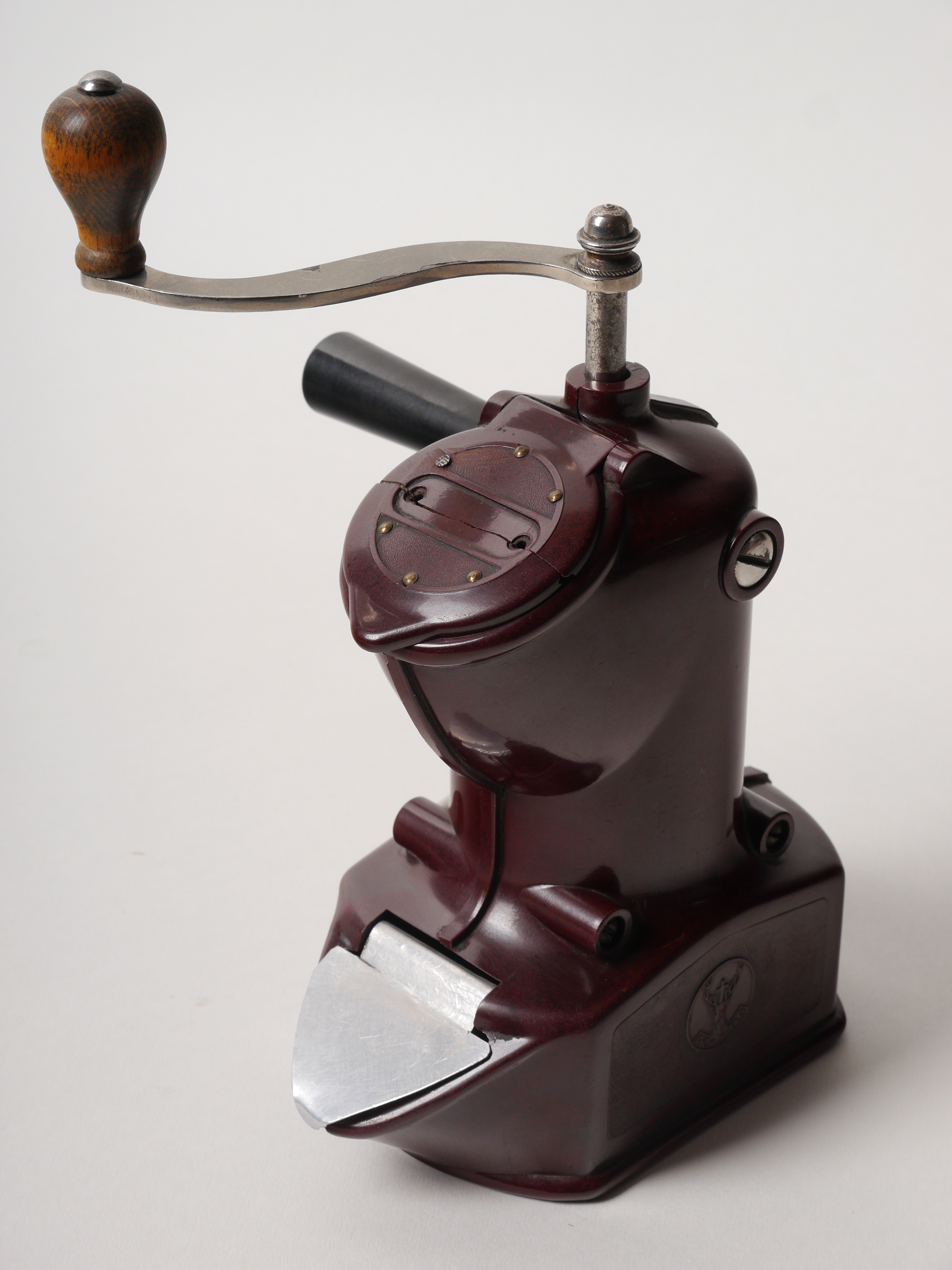
Manual coffee grinder in bakelite, collection Museum of Industry Ghent.

== Materials ==
Several types of material are used as the grinding element in mills, each with its own particular advantages. Corrosion-resistant materials such as ceramic and acrylic plastic rather than metals are used to grind salt. Domestic grinders are used for culinary purposes, grinding pepper and other spices, salt, and coffee.

- Stainless steel: One of the most suitable and durable materials for grinding peppercorns and coffee beans. The male and female sections of the grinding mechanism are usually made from sintered metal. The teeth of the grinder are machined to cut spice or beans.
- Zinc alloy: Perhaps the most common mechanism found in pepper grinders, zinc alloy is composed of a mixture of metals, primarily zinc, often with chrome plating to resist corrosion. It is a good choice for grinding pepper.
- Carbon steel: An extremely hard metal, carbon steel provides the sharpest edges and most efficient grinding capability.
- Ceramic: Ceramic is extremely hard and provides the best performance for multi-use grinding. It does not corrode and is suitable for grinding coffee beans, pepper, salt, and spices.
- Acrylic: Durable and low cost, acrylic is a non-corrosive material suitable for grinding salt and spices.

== Electric grinders ==
Electric burr grinders are powered by electricity from a battery or mains supply. An electric motor drives the grinding elements against each other. Electric grinders grind faster than manual grinders with no effort, but friction and waste heat from the motor may heat the ground product slightly.

== See also ==
- Salt and pepper shakers – for salt grains and pre-ground peppercorns
