= Emsa (company) =

Emsa GmbH
- Company type: Subsidiary
- Industry: Consumer goods
- Founded: April 1, 1949; 77 years ago
- Headquarters: Emsdetten, Germany
- Area served: Worldwide
- Key people: Franz-Jörg Wulf, Frank Schepers, Günter Nosthoff, Ewald Ure
- Products: Household goods
- Revenue: 46 Million Euro (2007)
- Number of employees: 250
- Parent: Groupe SEB
- Website: www.emsa.com

Emsa GmbH is a medium-sized (SME) German manufacturer of consumer goods, kitchen utensils, garden equipment and garden accessories.

== History ==
Emsa was founded on 1 April 1949 by Franz Wulf as „Franz Wulf & Co Plasticwarenfabrik" in Greven.

A little drip-catcher made of plastic and formed like a butterfly was the company's first product. After drip-catchers of different forms the company started producing pastry-cutting wheels, icing bags and comparable kitchen accessories.

On 1 October 1956 the company moved from Greven to larger premises in Emsdetten and added floristry utensils to its range of products.

Emsa was acquired by the French corporation Group SEB in June 2016 for an undisclosed sum. Groupe SEB operates a portfolio of brands including Tefal, SEB, Rowenta, Moulinex, Krups, Lagostina, All-Clad, WMF and Supor marketed through multi-format retailing.

The Emsa City Cup is often seen in the television series The Expanse.

== Name and company vision ==
Against the background of their location in Emsdetten and its main river Ems the firm's name was altered to today's "Emsa" on 29 December 1964.

== Range of products ==
1. Thermos bottles with patent-registered bottle closures.
  Sales volume over 1,5 Mio. each year.
2. Cooking utensils
  Mixing bowls, measuring jugs, chopping boards, can openers, garlic press devices etc.
3. Tableware
  Crockery including special products for children, trays, bowls and more. The products consist of enhanced plastic, stainless steel or selected wood.
4. Conservation
  A variety of food storage containers in different sizes and forms which can all be used in microwaves. It is the same range of products as offered by Komax and is partly labelled with their logo.
5. Garden equipment
  Flower buckets of all kinds, watering cans and spray guns. Using the alternative trademark Esteras the company offers also handmade terrakotta containers, articles consisting of a special blend of fibre glass called NatureLite and even fountains in different colours.

Competitors include amongst others Bodum, Tupperware, and Lock & Lock.

== Logo ==
In 1971 the new logo was introduced and has been used ever since to distribute the company's products either directly from their headquarters in Emsdetten as well as through more than 50 associated distribution channels. In Emsdetten there are currently more than 250 people employed for the purpose of fabrication, product development and administration.
