= Airmate =

Air and Ventilation Manufacturer

Airmate Electrical (Shenzhen) Co. Ltd.
- Type: Private
- Industry: Home appliances
- Founded: 1973; 53 years ago
- Founder: Shi Hongyao
- Headquarters: George Town, Cayman Islands; Shenzhen, China
- Area served: America; Asia and Pacific; Europe; Middle East
- Key people: Shi Ruibin (Chairman)
- Products: Electric fans Electric heaters Ventilation fans Health machines Humidifiers; Air purifiers Blenders; Electric pressure cookers Rice cookers Induction cookers
- Parent: Airmate (Cayman) International Co. Ltd.
- Website: Airmate Global; Airmate China; Airmate Taiwan

Airmate is a Chinese air and ventilation brand and an OEM manufacturer of household electric fans for other brands sold in most countries and was founded as Tung Fu Electric Co. Ltd. in Taiwan in 1973. They later expanded operations in Hong Kong in 1990, and in China in 1997.

Airmate produces fans mostly in America, Asia, Europe, and the Middle East.

== History ==
Airmate was founded in 1973 in Taiwan as the Taiwan Tung Fu Electric Co. Ltd. and by then, its global company branding was Emmett while Airmate was used for their brand identity. They expanded operations in Hong Kong in 1990 under Waon Development Ltd. and established a production plant in Shenzhen, China in 1991. Following the development as an OEM manufacturer and as a brand in Taiwan and Hong Kong, they expanded operations in China in 1997 and by this period, Airmate was used for both entity branding and brand identity.

Airmate collaborated with Sanyo Electric Co. Ltd. of Japan in 1994 to manufacture dedicated fan motors for Sanyo. Airmate has since then, became the OEM producers of renowned brands Hitachi, Rowenta, Samsung, Sanyo, Tefal, Toshiba, and Vornado.

== OEM clients ==
Clients/Brands produced by Airmate

Client brand	Product line	Market/s	Years in production	Status	Notes
Airmate (main)	Electric fans Electric heaters Ventilation fans Health machines Humidifiers Air purifiers Blenders Electric pressure cookers Rice cookers Induction cookers	Asia and Pacific (mainly China, Taiwan and Hong Kong) Europe Middle East	1973–present 1990–present (Hong Kong) 1997–present (China)	Active	Labelled as 바람친구 in South Korea. Distributed by Yuasa in Japan.
Acerpure	Electric fans	Asia and Pacific Europe	2023–present	Active	—N/a
Anac	Electric fans	South Korea	2010–2015	Former	—N/a
Aniko	Electric fans	Africa	2000s-present	Active	—N/a
Asahi	Electric fans	Philippines	1984–present	Active	Among all brands, Asahi is the only brand that assembles Airmate fans outside China as Airmate distributes parts to Asahi. Asahi is also their longest-running client since 1984. Asahi's mixed factory-assembly plant is located in Binondo, Manila, Philippines.
Black and Decker	Electric fans	Middle East Philippines	2000–2016	Former	—N/a
Carlton	Electric fans	United Kingdom	1990s	Former	Commonly branded as Carlton Breezy.
Cielo	Electric fans	Japan	1990s	Former	A former sub-brand of Yuasa.
Clatronic	Electric fans	Europe	1990s	Former	—N/a
Cornell	Electric fans	Singapore	2010s	Former	—N/a
De' Longhi	Electric heaters	Europe	2005–present	Active	—N/a
Elabitax	Electric fans	Japan	2010–2016	Former	—N/a
Hanabishi	Electric fans	Philippines	2024–present	Active	Airmate produces Hanabishi's DC Stand Fan models HDC16WHT and HDC16SFBLK.
Hanil	Electric fans Electric heaters	South Korea	2006–present	Active	—N/a
Hitachi	Air Purifiers Electric fans	Japan Hong Kong Middle East Saudi Arabia Singapore Thailand Vietnam	2000s-2010s, 2024-present	Active	—N/a
Imarflex	Electric fans	Hong Kong	2010s	Former	—N/a
Koizumi	Electric fans Electric heaters	Japan	2010s-present	Active	—N/a
Marusi	Electric fans	Philippines	1990s-2000s	Former	—N/a
Micromark	Electric Fans	United Kingdom	1980s–2000s	Former	—N/a
Mistral	Electric fans	Australia New Zealand Indonesia Malaysia Singapore	1990s (Australia and New Zealand) 1990–2004 (Indonesia, Malaysia, and Singapore) 2017–2020, 2025-present (Malaysia and Singapore)	Active	—N/a
Morita	Electric Fans	Japan	2001-present	Active	—N/a
Pifco	Electric fans	United Kingdom	1990s–2000s	Former	—N/a
Plusmate	Electric fans	South Korea	2010–present	Active	—N/a
Rowenta	Electric fans	Europe United States United Kingdom	1990s-present	Active	—N/a
RS Pro	Electric fans	Europe United Kingdom	1990s–2000s	Discontinued	Few stocks are still sold in RS Pro Europe webpages.
Samsung	Electric fans	South Korea	2006–present	Active	—N/a
Sanken	Electric fans	Indonesia	1990s–2000s	Former	—N/a
Sankey	Electric fans	Central and South America	1990s–2000s	Former	—N/a
Sanyo	Electric fans	Hong Kong Middle East Philippines South Korea	2001–2009	Former	—N/a
Sharp	Electric fans	Hong Kong Japan Singapore Taiwan	2015–present	Active	—N/a
Shinil	Electric fans Electric heaters	South Korea	2005–present	Active	—N/a
TAT	Electric fans	Saudi Arabia	2000–present	Active	—N/a
Tefal	Electric fans	Europe Middle East Singapore Thailand United Kingdom	1990s–present	Active	Several Tefal models are based from some of Rowenta models. Both Tefal and Rowenta have the same parent company.
Toshiba	Air purifiers	Worldwide	2010s-present	Active	—N/a
Toyomi	Electric fans	Singapore	2000s–2010s	Former	—N/a
Toyotomi	Electric fans	Japan	2010s-present	Active	—N/a
Vornado	Electric fans Electric heaters	America Asia and Pacific Europe	2010–present	Active	—N/a
Zepeal	Electric fans	Japan	2010s-present	Active	

== See also ==
- Black+Decker
- De' Longhi
- Gree Electric
- Midea Group
- Rowenta
- Samsung Electronics
- Sanyo
- Tefal
- Toshiba
