= Baku Electronics =

Azerbaijani retail company

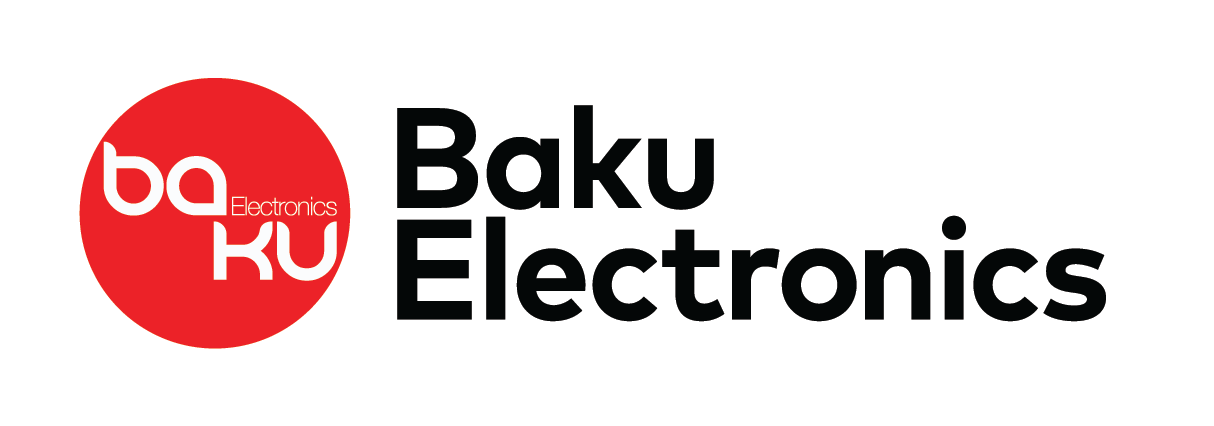
- Company type: LLC
- Industry: Electronics, Furniture, Transportation, Retail
- Founded: 1994
- Founder: NAB Holding
- Number of employees: 1400
- Website: bakuelectronics.az

Baku Electronics is an Azerbaijan-based company specialising in consumer electronics, vehicles, and furniture retail.

The company was founded in 1994 and is a part of "NAB Holding", which specialises in retail, vehicles and finance. Baku Electronics now has over 30 stores across Azerbaijan and is the distributor of more than 60 international companies.

Baku Electronics is the official distributor of global companies such as Samsung, LG, Bosch, Sony, Huawei, Xiaomi, Tefal, Rowenta, Panasonic, HP, Acer, Philips, Lenovo, Kenwood, Braun, Delonghi and the official retailer of Apple.

== History ==
Baku Electronics was founded in 1994 by Türkiye-based "NAB Holding" in Azerbaijan. After a year of operation, the company became the official "Samsung Electronics" distributor in 1995. In 2001, the company claimed the distributor rights of brands of "SEB group", such as "Tefal", "Moulinex", "Rowenta", and "Krups". It also became the distributor of "Lagonstina" in 2007.

== Stores ==
Currently, Baku Electronics has more than 30 stores all over the country, specifically in Baku, Khyrdalan, Sumgait, Barda, Ganja, Ismayilli, Lankaran, Mingachevir, Quba, Shaki, Shamkir, Khachmaz.
