= Lescure =

Lescure may refer to:

== Places ==
- Lescure, Ariège, a commune in the Ariège departement in the Occitania region in southern France
- Lescure-Jaoul, a commune in the Aveyron departement in the Occitania region in France
- Lescure-d'Albigeois, a commune in the Tarn departement in the Occitania region in France
- Lescure Park Stadium, former name of the soccer and rugby Chaban-Delmas Stadium, in Bordeaux, France

== People ==
- Emmanuel Lescure (?-2017), French businessman
- Jean Lescure, French poet
- Louis Marie de Lescure, French soldier and opponent of the French Revolution
- Louis-Frédéric Lescure (1904-1993), French industrialist
- Pierre Lescure, French journalist and television executive
