= Thierry de La Tour d'Artaise =

French businessman

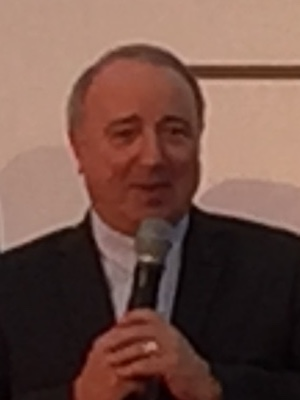
- d'Artaise in 2017
- Born: 27 October 1954 (age 71); Lyon, France
- Education: ESCP Europe
- Occupation: Businessman
- Title: CEO of Groupe SEB
- Spouse: Bénédicte Lescure
- Children: 5
- Relatives: Emmanuel Lescure (father-in-law)

Thierry de La Tour d'Artaise is a French businessman. He is the chairman and chief executive officer (CEO) of Groupe SEB.

== Biography ==
=== Early life ===
Thierry de La Tour d'Artaise was born in Lyon. He is a Count and descendant of Henri de la Tour (1627-1687), Lord of Artaise-le-Vivier in the Ardennes. He graduated from ESCP Europe in Paris. He is a chartered accountant. He speaks Thai, Portuguese and English fluently, and some Italian and Chinese.

=== Career ===
From 1979 to 1983, he was an audit manager with Coopers & Lybrand. He served as the chief financial officer of Croisières Paquet, a subsidiary of Groupe Chargeurs, from 1984 to 1986, and as CEO from 1986 to 1993.

He joined Groupe SEB in 1994. He served as chairman of Calor (now a subsidiary of Groupe SEB) from 1996 to 1998 and as its CEO from 1994 to 1998. In 1999, he became vice president of Groupe SEB. Since 2000, he has served as its chairman and CEO. He owns 125,417 shares of Groupe SEB.

He sits on the supervisory board of Siparex and Rowenta, on the advisory council of the Banque de France, and on the management board of Actiref. He sits on the board of directors of Plastic Omnium, Legrand and Club Med.

=== Personal life ===
He married Bénédicte Lescure in 1980. She is the daughter of Emmanuel Lescure, and granddaughter of Louis-Frédéric Lescure (1904-1993), who founded Groupe SEB in 1925. Her family own 43.9% its shares and are worth 1.4 billion euros.

They have five children.
