= OBH =

OBH may refer to:

- Ole Bødtcher-Hansen A/S (often marketed as "OBH"), a Danish company that became OBH Nordica via a 2002 merger
- Oak Bay High School in Oak Bay, British Columbia, Canada
- Old Buckenham Hall School, a school in the village of Brettenham, Suffolk, England
- The Outer Banks Hospital, a critical access hospital located in North Carolina, United States
- Original Block Hustlaz, a record label and group associated with American rapper AR-Ab
- ⟨obh⟩, a Latin-script trigraphs used in Irish
