= Biederlack =

Biederlack is a German manufacturer of jacquard woven high-pile acrylic blankets and throws.

== History ==
Biederlack was founded in 1887 by Ignaz Hermann Biederlack in Greven, Germany, grandfather of Robert and Hans-Felix Biederlack. But the history dates back to 1532, when Heinrich settled along the River Ems and opened a merchant trading business. He became known as Heinrich Biederlack, "Heinrich by the Lake." .

- 1532 A man named Hinrik settles on the shores of the ox bow lake formed by the river Ems and from this time on he became known as Hinrick by the lake – Biederlack. He formed a merchant trading business, the sound basis on which the Biederlack family builds its business.
- 1887 On the 22nd of August Ignatz Hermann Biederlack (1861–1930) founded the company Hermann Biederlack GmbH + Co. in Greven.
- 1930 The sons Felix (1893–1948) and Carl (1894–1952) built a factory in Cuba, which produced blankets until the war.
- 1948 Carl Biederlack shoots and kills brother Felix Biederlack
- 1952 Carl Biederlack jumps from a courtroom window to his death
- 1958 Hans-Felix Biederlack (1935–2005, son of Felix Biederlack) joins the company as managing director.
- 1967 Robert Biederlack (Son of Carl Biederlack) joins Hans-Felix as managing director and runs the company together with Hans-Felix.
- 1979 Hermann Biederlack GmbH + Co. founds the subsidiary Biederlack of America Inc. in Cumberland/Maryland, USA, to produce blankets in the already developed market. Richard Alford joins the company as its general manager. Today the company imports semi-finished products from Greven.
- 1981 Hermann Biederlack GmbH + Co. builds a new warehouse system to improve delivery service.
- 1987 a new weaving department is built.
- 1996 Across town, a lean manufacturing principled open-end spinning mill started in the former Kelly-Springfield Tire manufacturing buildings. Greg Lindsay joins the company as its Plant Manager.
- 2000 Dr.Michael Ottenjann (Son in law of Hans-Felix Biederlack) joins the company as managing director.
- 2001 A new, fully automatic transfer sewing line is being installed.
- 2005 Hans-Felix Biederlack dies unexpectedly at the age of 73 years.
- 2005 Robert Biederlack retires as managing director.
- 2006 Production manager Rolf Gottmann joins the company as a new managing director. The company Borbo-Blankets (Geiger, Borgers GmbH & Co.KG), Bocholt, is being taken over. Finishing of the new dye house for further increase of productivity.
- 2007 Robert Biederlack dies at the age of 68 years.
- 2009 Biederlack announces closure of its North America manufacturing operations.

== Biederlack of America ==
Led by new general manager Richard Alford, the American subsidiary of Biederlack opened in 1979 with a distribution center in Cumberland, Maryland. In 1987, the Distribution Center was expanded. In 1981 a new mill was built in a vacant grocery store in Cumberland. New high-speed Jacquard looms, finishing equipment, and cut-and-sew operations were installed. In 1996, led by new Plant Manager Greg Lindsay, the company renovated several vacant Kelly-Springfield Tire manufacturing buildings and began installing its 7 million pound per year spinning mill using lean manufacturing and completing its vertically integrated manufacturing goal.

In 1998, Biederlack of America purchased Cushion Craft of East Newark, NJ, a supplier of professional sports- and college-licensed pillows. This acquisition made Biederlack the largest distributor of sports-licensed blanket/throws and pillows in North America.

The Biederlack label is stitched to original copyrighted designs and to licensed products for the National Football League, National Basketball Association, National Hockey League, Major League Baseball, Major League Soccer, NASCAR, Collegiate Licensing Company, Harley Davidson, and other properties.
