= Schaerer Ltd =

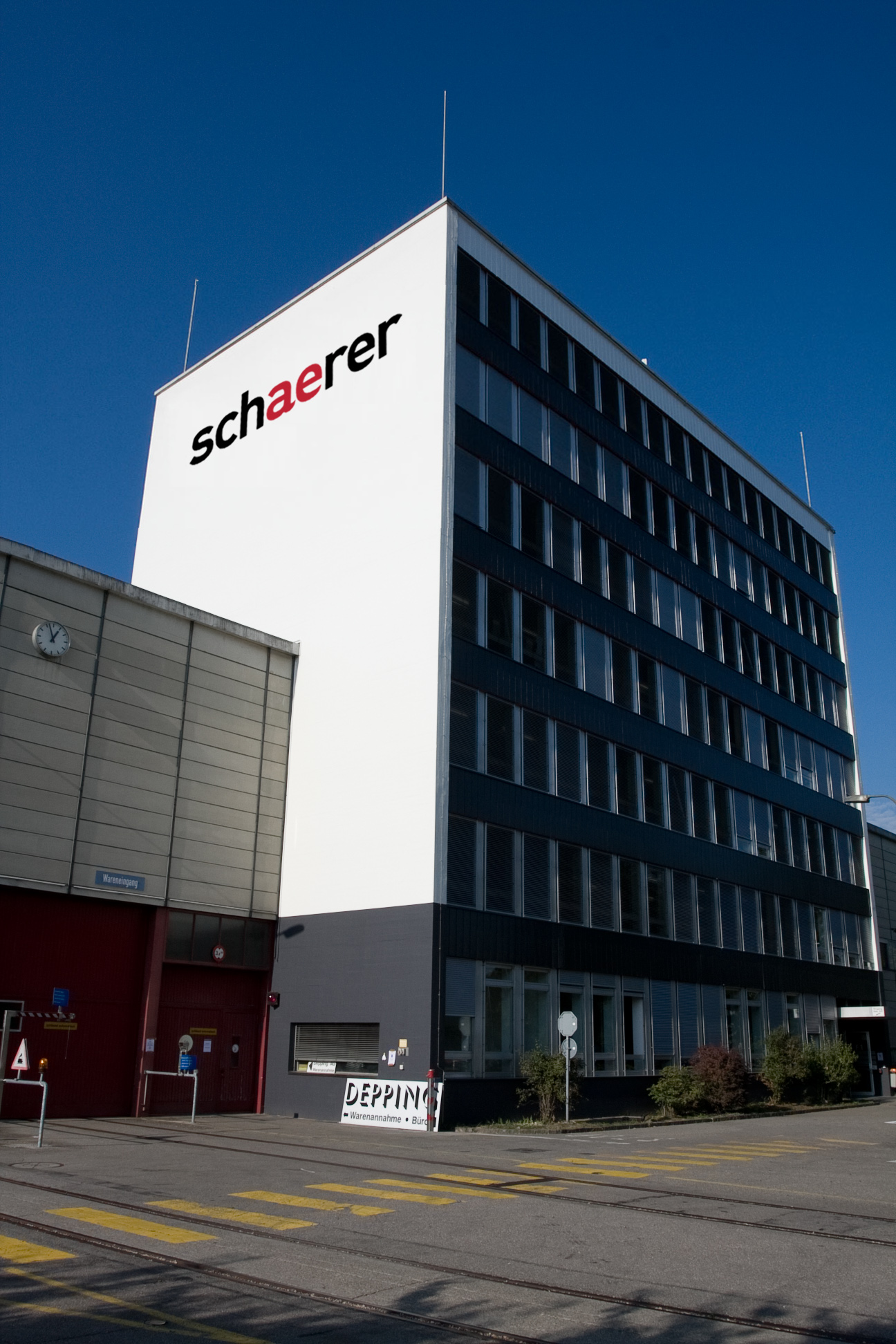
- Company type: Subsidiary
- Industry: Espresso machines
- Founded: 1892; 134 years ago in Bern, Switzerland
- Founder: Maurice Schaerer
- Headquarters: Zuchwil, Switzerland
- Key people: Thomas Fröhlicher (CEO)
- Products: Espresso machines
- Revenue: 139.1 Mio Swiss Francs (2015)
- Number of employees: 388 worldwide (281 in Switzerland)
- Parent: Groupe SEB
- Website: schaerer.com

Schaerer Ltd is a manufacturer of fully automatic coffee machines for private and professional use. It is headquartered in the Swiss town of Zuchwil near Solothurn. The company ranks among the top three largest producers of fully automatic coffee machines. Schaerer develops and manufactures its products in Zuchwil and has around 250 employees. In 2010, the company generated a turnover of more than 100 million Swiss Francs. Schaerer is a member of the WMF Württembergische Metallwarenfabrik AG.

== History ==
In 1892, Maurice Schaerer founded a factory for medical equipment in the Swiss city of Berne. The company, which rapidly gained international recognition and opened branches abroad, produced sterilisation equipment, surgical devices and operating tables. In 1914 a mobile operating table co-developed by Bernese doctor Fritz de Quervain won the Grand Prix at the World Exhibition in Paris.

The manufacture of "breakfast appliances" (i.e. coffee machines for hospital use) began in 1919. Within the next twenty years, the company began offering an expansive line of coffee machines to customers in the restaurant sector for use in establishments ranging from small cafés to grand hotels.

In 1957, the company introduced the first coffee machine with a fully automatic hydraulic piston system. The dosing mechanism for coffee was automated in 1967 and the first fully automatic machine with an integrated grinder was launched two years later. Production of "Schaerer Matic" began in 1984. In 1997, the company launched the world's first automatic cappuccino system onto the market.

Schaerer's cooperation with WMF in the areas of development, procurement and technology began in early 2003. The German company took over 34% of Schaerer. This was closely followed by cooperation in the areas of service and customer support. That year, the company reported a revenue of 240 million Swiss Francs in fully automatic coffee machines, making it the world's market leader with a total market share of around 20%. The takeover by WMF AG was in 2006 and 2009 the relocation of the headquarters from Moosseedorf (BE) to Zuchwil (SO) took place.

== Literature ==
Schaerer Latte Art: The Art of Barista Coffee Preparation, German/English September 2007 (First Edition in Korean, March 2006, Author: Young Min Lee) ISBN 978-3-033-01368-1
