= Fresh Prints =

American custom clothing company

- Type: Private
- Industry: Customized apparel
- Founded: 2009
- Headquarters: New York City, New York, U.S.
- Area served: Worldwide
- Key people: Josh Arbit (CEO)
- Revenue: $40 million (2022)
- Number of employees: 290 (2022)
- Website: freshprints.com

Fresh Prints is an American custom apparel company based in New York City. Founded in 2009 by college students, it offers designs and printing for collegiate and corporate merchandise. Fresh Prints also operates through a network of student representatives called Campus Managers.

== History ==
Fresh Prints was co-founded in 2009 by Jason Israel of the University of Pennsylvania and Sasha Sherman. The business initially operated as a student-run venture on several university campuses.

In 2012, Jacob Goodman and Josh Arbit, who were part of the same fraternity at Washington University in St. Louis, used Arbit's bar mitzvah money to acquire Fresh Prints for $16,000. After graduation, Goodman and Arbit moved its operations to New York City. Jolijt Tamanaha joined as a third co-owner in 2015. By 2016, the company's annual sales exceeded $1.9 million.

In 2021, Fresh Prints launched an in-house apparel line with a sweat set (matching sweatshirt and sweatpants).

== Operations ==
Fresh Prints uses a network of college students who work independently as campus managers. These representatives sell custom apparel to student organizations. Fresh Prints provides them with training, design assistance, order financing, and an online platform. Fresh Prints started in 2009 with five campus managers. By 2016, Fresh Prints had 120 Campus Managers across the U.S. and by 2022 this number had increased to 625.

Fresh Prints sells merchandise like shirts, sweatshirts, bottles, and others for Greek-letter organizations, schools, student clubs, and companies. It is listed on Affinity Licensing as a licensed vendor for Greek organizations and Collegiate Licensing Company for universities in the U.S.
