= Marc Grégoire =

French inventor of the Teflon-coated pan (1906–1996)

Marc Grégoire (January 15, 1906 - January 10, 1996) was an inventor of PTFE (Teflon) coated non-stick pans. He was an ONERA engineer at the time of the invention. In one version of the story, he devised a method to apply Teflon to an aluminum mould, to assist the removal of glass fibre fishing rods from the mould. When his wife, Colette M. Grégoire, learned of it, she challenged him to create a non-stick saucepan. He succeeded by applying Teflon to the base of a frying pan. Another conflicting version tells that the technique to apply Teflon on aluminum was developed by his colleague, not by himself, and Grégoire wanted to coat his fishing gear to prevent tangles, instead of wanting to coat an aluminum mould.

Marc earned a patent for the invention in 1954. In 1956 Grégoire and his wife launched the Tefal Corporation, developing the slogan: La Poêle Tefal, la poêle qui n’attache vraiment pas (The Tefal saucepan, the saucepan pan that really doesn’t stick.) By 1960, they sold 3 million items annually.
