= Corruption in France =

Corruption in France describes the prevention and occurrence of corruption in France.

France has ratified several important international anti-corruption conventions such as the OECD Convention on Combating Bribery of Foreign Public Officials in International Business Transactions and the United Nations Convention against Corruption. In general, investors do not consider corruption a problem for doing business in France, and companies operating in France generally have a good reputation for corporate social responsibility.

The French National Assembly have passed two bills for combating tax evasion. However, in recent years there have been several corruption scandals involving high-ranking public officials. Public works and the defence industry are considered the most affected by corruption.

Transparency International's 2025 Corruption Perceptions Index scored France at 66 on a scale from 0 ("highly corrupt") to 100 ("very clean"). When ranked by score, France ranked 27th among the 182 countries in the Index, where the country ranked first is perceived to have the most honest public sector. For comparison with regional scores, the best score among Western European and European Union countries (Note: Austria, Belgium, Bulgaria, Croatia, Cyprus, Czechia, Denmark, Estonia, Finland, France, Germany, Greece, Hungary, Iceland, Ireland, Italy, Latvia, Lithuania, Luxembourg, Malta, Netherlands, Norway, Poland, Portugal, Romania, Slovakia, Slovenia, Spain, Sweden, Switzerland, and the United Kingdom.) was 89, the average score was 64 and the worst score was 40. For comparison with worldwide scores, the best score was 89 (ranked 1), the average score was 42, and the worst score was 9 (ranked 181, in a two-way tie).

== Extent and perceptions ==
In 2011, Transparency International concluded in its annual report 2011 that France does not do enough to stop corruption. A TNS Sofres poll in October 2011 indicated that 72% of the French public had the perception that politicians are corrupt.

In France, in 2009 all major foreign investors and exporters and more than 80 per cent of surveyed executives admitted to 'not being familiar at all' with one of the most important legal frameworks in global business. A cartel constitutes a crime punishable by imprisonment and/or fines. Staff and budgets for public enforcement of securities regulation was one third in France compared to the UK in 2008.

== Areas ==
=== Elections ===
Political corruption studies include the presidential campaign 2007 finance investigation in the value of €150,000 from Liliane Bettencourt to Nicolas Sarkozy. The maximum individual support is €4,600. Jacques Chirac was accused of using public funds for his election campaign in Paris in the 1990s. On 15 December 2011, Chirac was found guilty and given a suspended sentence of two years. He was convicted of diverting public funds, abuse of trust and illegal conflict of interest.

The suspended sentence meant he did not have to go to prison and took account of his age, health, and status as a former head of state. He did not attend his trial since medical doctors deemed that his neurological problems damaged his memory.

=== Bribery ===
Bribery investigations spanning from Africa to France are ongoing, including allegations involving Jacques Chirac, Dominique de Villepin, and Jean-Marie Le Pen, who were allegedly linked to bribery claims made by former Gabonese President Omar Bongo. In September 2011, Bernard Granié was tried for accepting a €300,000 bribe from Provence Recyclage.

=== Energy sector ===
Alstom has been under investigation in France and Switzerland for allegedly making improper payments of US$200 million for contracts for Brazil's Itá hydroelectric plant, for São Paulo's subway expansion and for other major works in Venezuela, Singapore and Indonesia. The Mexican government has penalised Alstom and in 2007 the European Commission's antitrust authority fined Alstom €65 million for price fixing with competitors.

== Anti-corruption activities ==
In 2021, former president Nicolas Sarkozy was convicted of corruption in two separate trials.

== See also ==
- Corruption scandals in the Paris region
- List of French political scandals
- Police corruption in France
- Law on transparency, the fight against corruption and the modernization of economic life

General:

- Crime in France
- International Anti-Corruption Academy
- Group of States Against Corruption
- International Anti-Corruption Day
- ISO 37001 Anti-bribery management systems
- United Nations Convention against Corruption
- OECD Anti-Bribery Convention
- Transparency International
