= OBH Nordica =

Tefal - OBH Nordica Group AB
- Native name: OBH Nordica
- Formerly: Joffe Marketing AB (Nordica); Ole Bødtcher-Hansen A/S (OBH)
- Company type: Subsidiary
- Industry: Consumer products
- Predecessor: Joffe Marketing AB (1959); Ole Bødtcher-Hansen A/S (1985)
- Founded: 2002; 23 years ago
- Founder: Bertil Joffe; Ole Bødtcher-Hansen
- Area served: Nordic; Czech Republic
- Number of employees: 150 (2014)
- Parent: Groupe SEB

OBH Nordica is a Nordic company headquartered in Sweden with subsidiaries in Denmark, Finland and Norway, which produces a broad range of products, including within the categories of personal care, clocks, weather stations, cooking utilities, and draft beer dispensers. Some products sold as OBH Nordica are rebranded versions of products from parent company Tefal.

== History ==
The company was created in a 2002 fusion between the Danish Ole Bødtcher-Hansen A/S (OBH) and the Swedish Joffe Marketing AB.

Bertil Joffe AB was founded by Bertil Joffe in 1959 in Sweden.

Ole Bødtcher-Hansen A/S (OBH) was founded in Denmark in 1985.
