= Law on transparency, the fight against corruption and the modernization of economic life =

French law aimed at fighting corruption

Sapin II Law

XIVth Legislature of the Fifth French Republic
- Long title: Law № 2016-1691 of December 9, 2016, on transparency, anti-corruption, and economic modernization
- Citation: ECFM1605542L
- Territorial extent: France
- Enacted by: XIVth Legislature of the Fifth French Republic
- Enacted: November 8, 2016
- Signed: December 9, 2016
- Introduced by: Michel Sapin
- Status: Unknown

The Law on transparency, the fight against corruption and the modernization of economic life (French: Loi relative à la transparence, à la lutte contre la corruption et à la modernisation de la vie économique), also known as the Sapin II law—named after the French Minister of the Economy at the time, Michel Sapin, who pushed it through in November 2016—is a French law aimed at fighting corruption, but which has been enriched by various measures from a wide range of other issues.

== History ==
At the Council of Ministers meeting on March 30, 2016, the Minister of the Economy and Finance, Michel Sapin, presented the draft law on transparency, the fight against corruption, and the modernization of economic life. He claims that the law “will bring France up to the best international standards in the field of transparency and action against corruption.”

Several civil society organizations (Anticor, Attac, BLOOM, CCFD-Terre solidaire, Collectif Roosevelt, Justice et Paix, Observatoire Citoyen pour la Transparence Financière Internationale (OCTFI), ONE, Oxfam France, ActionAid France - Peuples Solidaires, Réseau Foi et Justice Afrique, Sherpa, Solidaires Finances Publiques and Syndicat de la magistrature) have issued their opinions on the “Sapin II” bill. They have published a joint deciphering note containing all their recommendations.

Parliamentary debate took place from May to November 2016. The law was subject to review by the Constitutional Council, which censured a provision aimed at forcing multinationals to make public information on their activities and taxation abroad but validated the rest of the text.

The law was passed in a context that some commentators saw as an economic war between the United States and other countries, mainly in Europe. This war would have been waged through a biased and extraterritorial application of US anti-corruption laws. Michel Sapin puts forward an entirely different analysis: “Justice and the judicial police lack the means. We end up with the current "not seen, not taken" situation. And other countries, such as the United States and Great Britain, are doing the punitive work for us. It's not good for our image or our sovereignty.

Council of Ministers	First Reading		New Reading		Final Reading	Constitutional Council	President of the Republic
Council of Ministers	National Assembly	Senate	National Assembly	Senate	National Assembly	Constitutional Council	President of the Republic
Presentation	Vote	Vote	Text	Vote	Vote	Decision	Promulgation
March 30 2016	June 14 2016	July 8 2016	September 29 2016	November 3 2016	November 8 2016	December 8 2016	December 9 2016

== Topics covered ==
=== Fighting corruption ===
In certain international forums, notably at the OECD in 2012 and 2014, France was not considered a country that adequately applied its regulations to combat international corruption. The Sapin II law strengthens the French system in this area. This is a particular source of concern as “French companies are active on international markets and rank at the head of several sectors known to be exposed to high risks of corruption.”

==== Creation of the French Anti-Corruption Agency ====
The law establishes the French Anti-Corruption Agency (AFA), a national body reporting to the Minister of Justice and the Minister for the Budget, whose mission is to help the competent authorities and those who come into contact with them to prevent and detect breaches of probity: corruption, influence peddling, misappropriation of public funds and favoritism. The AFA has a wide range of skills, particularly in consulting and control, and is designed to become a key player in the French fight against corruption in the public and private sectors.

==== Program to prevent corruption and influence peddling ====
The Sapin II law introduces an obligation to prevent corruption, which is binding on managers and legal entities. This obligation, known as “compliance,” aims to prevent and detect acts of corruption, in France or abroad, for companies or groups whose parent company is headquartered in France, which have more than 500 employees and sales over 100 million euros.

Implementation of this obligation implies the adoption by the company of 8 measures: a code of conduct, an internal alert system, risk mapping, a procedure for assessing the situation of customers, first-tier suppliers and intermediaries, accounting control procedures, a training system for the most exposed managers and staff, a disciplinary system and an internal control and assessment system. The AFA checks “the existence, quality, and effectiveness of these various measures before any infringement and independently of investigations and prosecutions for acts of corruption.”

==== Creation of the Public Interest Judicial Agreement ====
Based on the model of similar systems in other countries, such as the United States, the Sapin II Act introduces a Public Interest Judicial Agreement (CJIP). It enables the public prosecutor to propose that a legal entity implicated in corruption, influence peddling, or the laundering of certain tax fraud offenses enter into an agreement that replaces legal proceedings and enables disputes to be resolved more quickly. The effect is to extinguish public prosecution if the accused legal entity fulfills the obligations it has undertaken in the agreement.

The CJIP requires the company to implement a corruption prevention program. For a maximum period of three years, under the supervision of the AFA, the company must submit to a compliance program designed to ensure the existence and implementation of measures and procedures to prevent and detect corruption. It must also pay a fine to the Treasury, the amount of which must be set in proportion to the benefits derived from the breaches observed, up to a limit of 30% of average annual sales.

A judge must approve the CJIP. The judge decides whether the obligations imposed on the company are appropriate and proportionate. The validation decision by the president of the judicial court does not entail a finding of guilt and is not entered in bulletin no. 1 of the criminal record. Therefore, this decision cannot constitute the first term of recidivism or an automatic cause for exclusion from public contracts.

At the end of the procedure, the agreement, the fine, and the validation order are published.

The list of CJIPs concluded by the AFA can be consulted on the AFA and Ministry of Justice websites.

==== Whistle-blowers ====
The definition of “whistleblower” is enshrined in Article 6 of the law. A whistleblower is a natural person who discloses or reports, disinterestedly and in good faith, a crime or misdemeanor, a serious and manifest violation of an international commitment duly ratified or approved by France, of a unilateral act of an international organization taken based on such a commitment, of the law or regulations, or a threat or serious harm to the general interest, of which he or she has personal knowledge.

The law protects whistle-blowers: any employee who has reported a whistle-blowing incident, in compliance with the conditions laid down by law, may not be dismissed (article 12 of the law), excluded from a recruitment procedure, punished, or subjected to a discriminatory measure (art. L1132-3-3 of the French Labor Code).

In addition, the new law establishes the offense of obstructing a whistleblower. Any person obstructing, in any way whatsoever, the transmission of a whistleblowing report (hierarchical superior, employer referent, or employer) is punishable by one year's imprisonment and a fine of 15,000 euros (article 13 of the law).

==== Register of lobbyists ====
The law also provides for the creation of a register of lobbyists, reporting (i.e., country-by-country tax declarations by major corporations to combat tax evasion), and more. The law provided for the results of reporting to be made public (article 137 of the law), but the Constitutional Council rejected this measure as contrary to freedom of enterprise.

==== Belloubet circular and the effective use of information sources ====
In June 2020, Nicole Belloubet, then Minister of Justice, issued a circular to public prosecutors' offices designed to “fix the guidelines of French criminal policy in the fight against international corruption.” The circular consolidates the central role of the National Financial Prosecutor's Office in the fight against international corruption (mainly acts of bribery of foreign public officials) and advocates the effective use of all useful information that public authorities and administrations may come into contact with in carrying out their mission - in simple terms, they would become whistle-blowers transmitting information to the judicial authorities. The circular considers, for example, that the AFA could “be led to discover suspicious facts that could justify a report to the judicial authority” as part of its checks on the quality and effectiveness of corruption and influence-peddling prevention programs implemented by entities subject to Article 17 II of the Sapin II law.

The circular also encourages “voluntary disclosure by companies of acts of corruption committed in the course of their international business activities.” The directors of these companies are not “under an obligation to report such acts to the judicial authorities,” but the circular considers that “it may nevertheless be in their interest to do so, to seek in return a certain form of leniency concerning the prosecution methods that may be envisaged,” citing the example of the CJIP.

=== Insurance ===
- Life insurance (article 49 of the law, codified in art. L631-2-1 of the Monetary and Financial Code): the High Council for Financial Stability is authorized to suspend, delay, or limit cash withdrawals or arbitrages on life insurance in the event of a serious or characterized threat to the financial system. Withdrawals will be blocked for 3 months, renewable once.
- Retirement insurance (article 115 of the law): the law requires insurance companies, mutual insurers, and unions offering life insurance contracts whose benefits are linked to the cessation of professional activity to inform their policyholders annually when the date of liquidation of their pension under a compulsory old-age insurance scheme, or the legal retirement age, is exceeded.
- Damage insurance (article 83 of the law): extension of the scope of art. L112-10 of the Insurance Code to the loss or theft of means of payment.
- Law empowering the government to reform the insurance sector (articles 47 and 149 of the law): the law empowers the government to adopt by ordinance all measures relating to the compulsory insurance guarantee fund, in particular as regards limiting the scope of its mission in respect of compulsory motor and damage insurance, the procedures for intervening in the event of default by an insurance company operating in France under the freedom of establishment or the freedom to provide services, and the creation of a resolution regime for the insurance sector.

The ordinances have been published in the Journal officiel de la République française, and are in the process of being ratified.

=== Bank ===
The Livret de Développement Durable (sustainable development passbook) has become the Livret de Développement Durable et Solidaire (LDDS - Sustainable and Solidarity Development Booklet). Every year, holders of this passbook were offered the opportunity to donate part of the sums deposited in it to a social economy entity (article 80).

Ban on advertising for risky financial product trading sites (article 72 of the law): the law bans advertising for internet platforms offering potentially risky financial products to retail investors. Sponsorship operations to promote these financial products are also prohibited. A procedure involving the blocking of the website may be set up by the financial markets authority.

Early redemption of micro-PERPs (Plan d'Épargne Retraite Populaire - ): Article 116 of the law provides for four new cases of early redemption of a PERP.

=== Greater transparency in the agricultural sector ===
The Observatoire de la Formation des Prix et des Marges des Produits Alimentaires (OFPM - Observatory of the Formation of Prices and Margins of Food Products) is to examine the distribution of added value throughout the agricultural product marketing chain (article 98 of the law).

Promotions on milk and dairy products displayed in supermarkets may not exceed 30% of the value of the unit price scale, including management fees (article 106 of the law).

The law fights to define the origin of certain products such as milk and meat, and to strengthen the Safer system.

=== Other ===
On the economic front, the law also increases penalties for companies condemned for late payment and introduces a binding vote at shareholders' meetings on company directors' remuneration. On the other hand, the law maintains the cheque validity period at 1 year and 8 days.

It also modifies the rules governing unpacking sales (article 99 of the law).

== See also ==
- Corruption in France
