= Emmanuel Lescure =

French businessman

- Born: c. 1931
- Died: 1 April 2017; Dijon, France
- Occupation: Businessman
- Title: Chairman, Groupe SEB
- Term: 1976-90
- Successor: Jacques Gairard
- Children: 7
- Parent(s): Louis-Frédéric Lescure; Françoise Helie
- Relatives: Thierry de La Tour d'Artaise (son-in-law)

Emmanuel Lescure (c. 1930 – 1 April 2017) was a French businessman, and the chairman of Groupe SEB from 1976 to 1990.

== Early life ==
Lescure was one of eleven children of Louis-Frédéric Lescure, CEO of Groupe SEB from 1953 to 1972, and his wife Françoise Lescure née Helie.

== Career ==
Lescure spent his whole career with Groupe SEB, and was the chairman from 1976 to 1990.

== Personal life and death ==
Lescure had seven children:

- Vincent Lescure, married Christine
- Bénédicte Lescure, married Thierry de La Tour d'Artaise
- Isabelle Lescure, married Laurent Bouzoud
- Dominique Lescure, married Joseph de Bucy
- Pascale Lescure, married Jérôme Wittlin
- Bertrand Lescure, married Emmeline
- Raphaële Lescure, married François Mirallié

Lescure died in Dijon on 1 April 2017, aged 87.
