= Telescore 750 =

Home video game console by Groupe SEB

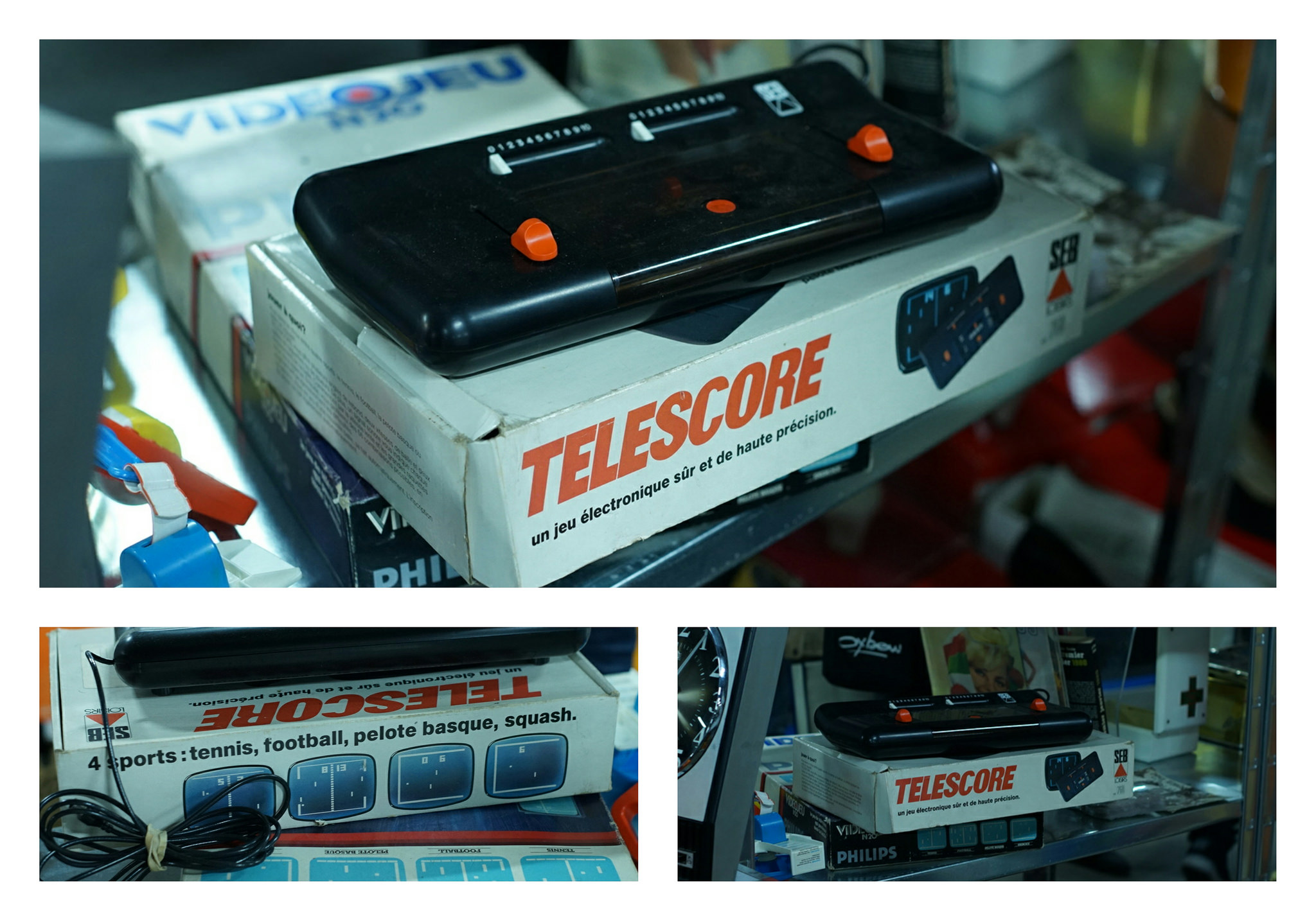
- A Telescore 750 with packaging
- Also known as: Telescore SEB 750
- Manufacturer: Groupe SEB
- Type: Dedicated home video game console
- Generation: First generation
- Released: 1977
- Lifespan: 1977–1978
- Introductory price: 100 Franc (1978)
- Power: Power adapter: 6 V Batteries: 4 x 1.5 volt LR14
- Successor: Telescore 751 (revision)

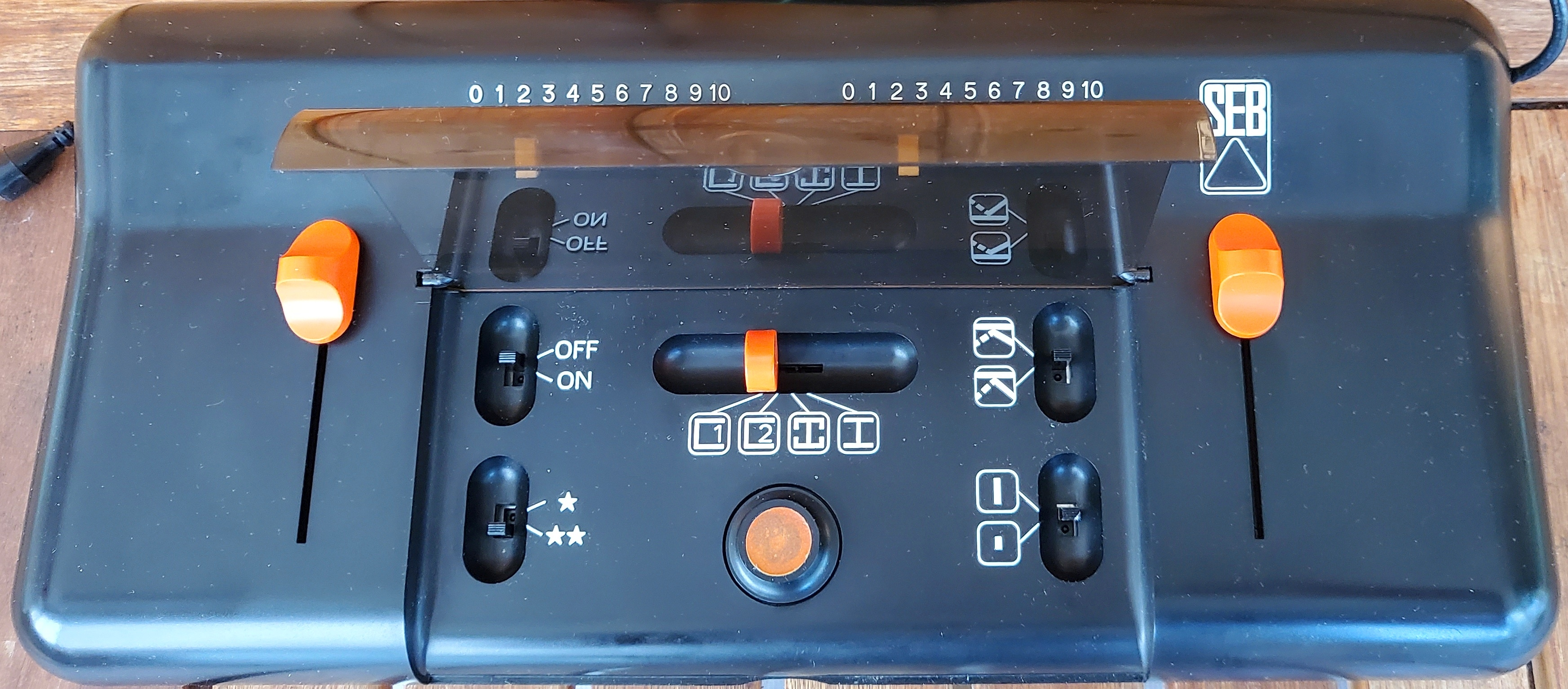
Close-up view of the Telescore 750

The Telescore 750 (also known as Telescore SEB 750) is a dedicated first-generation home video game console manufactured and released by Groupe SEB in 1977, only in France for 100 franc. Two revisions were released afterwards; the Telescore 751 in 1978, identical to the Telescore 750 but with two detachable game controllers and support for a lightgun sold separately, and the Telescore 752 in 1979, which was almost identical to the Telescore 751 but could also display games in color and had the lightgun included.

The system is powered by a power adapter with 6 V or 4 x 1.5 volt LR14 batteries.

== Games ==
Due to the TMS-1965-NC chipset from Texas Instruments, the Telescore 750 is able to play the following four games:

- tennis (Pong clone)
- football
- squash
- pelote basque

With the Telescore 751 and Telescore 752, it is also possible to play the following two extra games which need the lightgun:

- tir d'entraînement
- tir aux pigeons
