= Dismissal (employment) in France =

In French Labour Law a Dismissal is the breach of the employment contract by the employer. French Labour Law stipulates that an employment contract can be terminated by either of the parties. The 2008 reform of Labour Law introduced the possibility of a negotiated termination (voluntary termination of employment).

== Types of Dismissal ==
In France the following types of dismissal are possible: Dismissal for economic reasons (redundancy) - the dismissed person may not be replaced. This type of dismissal can occur for the following reasons:

- Serious economic difficulty
- Technological change
- Organisational change
- Liquidation of the company.

Dismissal linked to the employee - an employee dismissed will be replaced by another employee. This covers the following areas:

- Not being able to do your job properly
- Due to serious differences with employer or colleagues
- Misconduct.

== Compensation ==
=== Statutory Compensation ===
Statutory compensation is the legally binding minimum and may be replaced by a higher amount agreed between the employer and the employee representatives under a collective agreement. Employees who have held a position for more than 12 months are entitled to compensation for redundancy & dismissal (except if they have been dismissed for Gross Misconduct).

The amount of compensation is one-fifth of the monthly salary (4.5 days), excluding one-time bonuses, per year of employment up to 10 years, 2/15 per year thereafter. For example, a worker with a monthly salary of €1000 in his fifth year of employment would receive €1000 compensation.

=== Collective Compensation ===
This replaces the statutory minimum if it exists. It is tax-free and no payroll tax applies.

=== Claim for unfair dismissal or redundancy ===
An employment tribunal can overturn a dismissal or redundancy. If you win your case, the tribunal can order the employer to do any of the following:

- Pay compensation
- Pay tribunal fees and witness expenses you've paid
- Improve working conditions
- give the employee their job back.

The amount of compensation can depend on the number of employees in the company and their length of service and salary.

== Employees with special protection against dismissal and redundancy ==
The following employees are afforded special protection immediately prior to, during and after (up to 12 months) their mandate.

- Employee representatives
- Union representatives
- Employees serving in employment tribunals or bankruptcy courts

== See also ==
- Redundancy in United Kingdom law
- Unfair dismissal
- Wrongful dismissal
- Constructive dismissal
