= Greven =

- Town
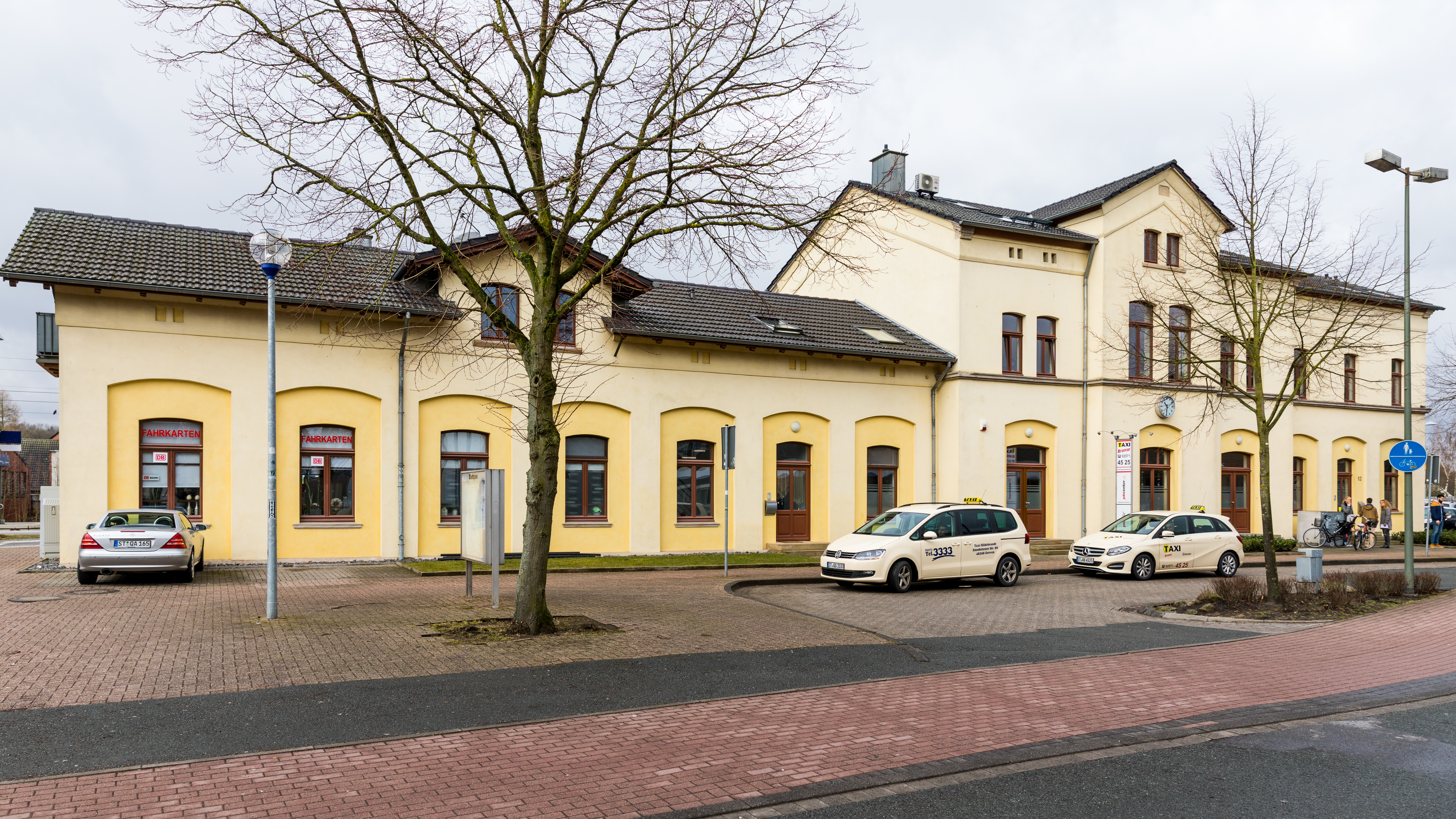
- Railway station in Greven

- Coat of arms

- Location of Greven within Steinfurt district
- Interactive map of Greven
- Location within Germany Location within North Rhine-Westphalia
- Coordinates: 52°05′30″N 7°36′30″E
- Country: Germany
- State: North Rhine-Westphalia
- Admin. region: Münster
- District: Steinfurt
- Subdivisions: 3

Government
  - Mayor (2020–25): Dietrich Aden (CDU)

Area
  - Total: 140.26 km^{2} (54.15 sq mi)
- Elevation: 45 m (148 ft)

Population (2025-12-31)
  - Total: 38,080
  - Density: 271.5/km^{2} (703.2/sq mi)
- Time zone: UTC+01:00 (CET)
  - Summer (DST): UTC+02:00 (CEST)
- Postal codes: 48268
- Dialling codes: 02571; 02575 Reckenfeld
- Vehicle registration: ST, BF, TE
- Website: www.greven.net

Greven (German pronunciation: [ˈɡʁeːvn̩]; Westphalian: Graiwen) is a medium-sized town in the district of Steinfurt, in Germany's most populous state of North Rhine-Westphalia and close to the city of Münster.

== Geography ==
Greven is situated on the river Ems, approx. 25 km south-east of Rheine and 15 km north of Münster.

=== Division of the town ===
Greven consists of the following districts

- Greven
- Reckenfeld
- Gimbte
- Schmedehausen

=== Neighbouring municipalities ===
- Altenberge
- Nordwalde
- Emsdetten
- Saerbeck
- Ladbergen
- Ostbevern
- Telgte
- Münster

== Population ==
Historical population

Year	Pop.	±% p.a.
1965	25,704	—
1970	27,176	+1.12%
1975	27,486	+0.23%
1980	28,744	+0.90%
1985	28,674	−0.05%
1990	31,010	+1.58%
1995	33,216	+1.38%

Year	Pop.	±% p.a.
2000	34,217	+0.60%
2005	35,427	+0.70%
2010	36,044	+0.35%
2015	36,674	+0.35%
2020	37,709	+0.56%
2025	38,080	+0.20%

Source: Landesdatabank Nordrhein-Westfalen

== Transport ==
=== Airport ===
Greven is home to North Rhine-Westphalia's fourth-largest airport Münster Osnabrück Airport (IATA code: FMO) transporting approx. 2.5 mil. passengers in 2009, but only 1.2 mil. in 2012 to destinations in Europe, Asia Minor, and North Africa.

=== Railway ===
- Regional express trains (Regional Express) - these trains do not stop at all stations:
  - Emden (north sea)-Leer(Ostfriesland)-Meppen-Lingen(Emsland)-Rheine-Greven-Münster Hauptbahnhof (Main railway station).
- Regional trains (Regional Bahn) - these trains stop at all stations:
  - Rheine-Mesum-Emsdetten-Reckenfeld-Greven-Münster Sprakel-Münster Zentrum Nord-Münster Hauptbahnhof(Main railway station).

=== Roads ===
The autobahn A1 from Heiligenhafen in Schleswig-Holstein to Saarbrücken passes near Greven, furthermore 2 bundesstrassen, B481 and B219.

=== Waterways ===
The Dortmund-Ems Canal crosses through Greven and was lately enlarged to carry ships up to 2,000 tons.

== Twin towns – sister cities ==
Greven is twinned with:

- Montargis, France (1968)

== See also ==
- Emsa (company) (1949)
