= All-Clad =

American cookware company

All-Clad Metalcrafters, LLC
- Type: Private, limited liability company
- Industry: Consumer Goods
- Founded: 1971
- Founder: John Ulam
- Headquarters: Canonsburg, Pennsylvania, USA
- Products: cookware, ovenware, kitchen tools, kitchen accessories
- Parent: Groupe SEB
- Website: all-clad.com

All-Clad Metalcrafters, LLC is an American cookware manufacturer headquartered in Canonsburg, Pennsylvania. The company markets its cookware to department stores and specialty stores in the United States, Australia, Canada, Germany, and the UK, along with All-Clad bonded ovenware, kitchen tools, and kitchen accessories.

== History ==
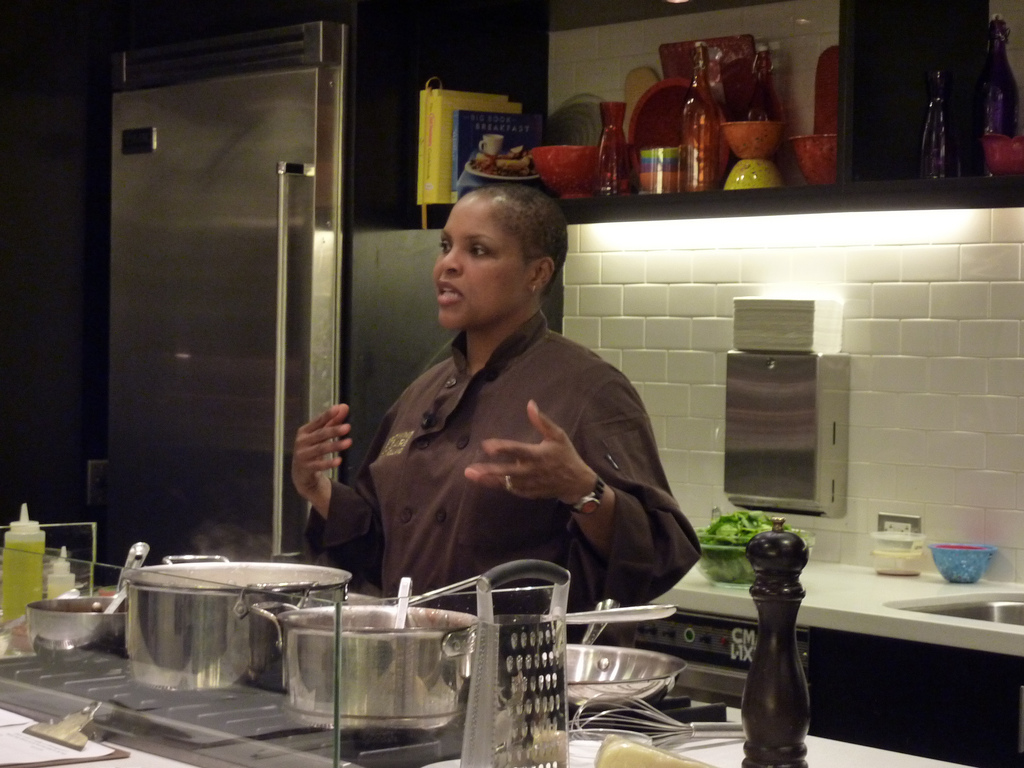
Tanya Holland hosting a 2011 All-Clad 40th Anniversary event at the San Francisco Bloomingdale's

The business was founded by metallurgist John Ulam in 1967 as a manufacturer of bonded metals, including coinage for the U.S. Mint, avionics, and ballistics.

The company's move to cookware happened by accident, when Ulam made a pan for his personal use. All-Clad Metalcrafters was established in 1971 to sell this cookware. Bloomingdale's picked up the brand two years later for its upscale housewares department. In 1988, All-Clad Metalcrafters was purchased by Pittsburgh Annealing Box Co. and in 2004, it was bought by the French conglomerate Groupe SEB.

In 2000, All-Clad partnered with television chef and personality Emeril Lagasse to develop a line of cookware named "Emerilware".

In 2014 All-Clad partnered with Chef Thomas Keller to produce the All-Clad TK that feature bonded aluminum and stainless with a copper core.

== United States patents ==
At the time of its founding, All-Clad used a patented "roll bonding" process by which metals are sandwiched together and then formed into a cooking vessel. The company derived its name from this cladding process, which is applied not only on the bottom but extends all the way up the sides of each cooking vessel. The company has been issued several patents by the United States Patent and Trademark Office (USPTO).

== Production ==
The firm purchases some of its metals from United States-based suppliers, including Pennsylvania Steel Company.

=== Product Issues ===
In 2022, All-Clad faced several class-action lawsuits alleging that certain stainless-steel bonded cookware lines were marketed as “dishwasher safe” despite repeated dishwasher use causing the aluminum core to become exposed. In August 2022, the company agreed to a proposed settlement of up to US$4 million to resolve the claims, without admitting wrongdoing.

== Cookware ==
=== Interior finishes ===
The cooking surface is made from Type 304 stainless steel. Some products include a nonstick coating on top of the stainless steel.

All stainless steel used by the company is certified to meet ISO 9000 and ASTM A240 standards for type 304 stainless steel intended for use with food.

=== Exterior finishes ===
The cookware is available in a combination of exterior metal finishes including stainless steel, brushed stainless steel, brushed aluminium alloy, black hardcoat anodized aluminium, copper, and copper core.

=== Comparison Chart ===
Feature	Stainless Steel (D3)	d5 Brushed Stainless	Copper Core	Hard Anodized	Specialty
Rolled Brim	No	Yes	Yes	No	No
Induction	Yes	Yes	Yes	No	No
Ply	3 Ply	5 Ply	5 Ply	1 Ply	1 Ply
Exterior Material	Magnetic Stainless Steel	Magnetic Stainless Steel	Magnetic Stainless Steel	Hard Anodized	Stainless Steel
Cooking Surface	18/10 Stainless Steel	18/10 Stainless Steel	18/10 Stainless Steel	PFOA Free Nonstick	18/10 Stainless Steel
Core	Aluminum	Aluminum & Stainless Steel	Aluminum & Copper	Aluminum	18/10 Stainless Steel
Dishwasher Safe	Yes	Yes	No	No	Yes
Oven Safe	600 degrees	500 degrees	500 degrees	450 degrees	500 degrees
Made In	USA	USA	USA	China	China

== Semiannual factory sale ==
Each year in June and December, All-Clad Metalcrafters holds a factory seconds sale near their headquarters in Canonsburg.

== Gallery ==
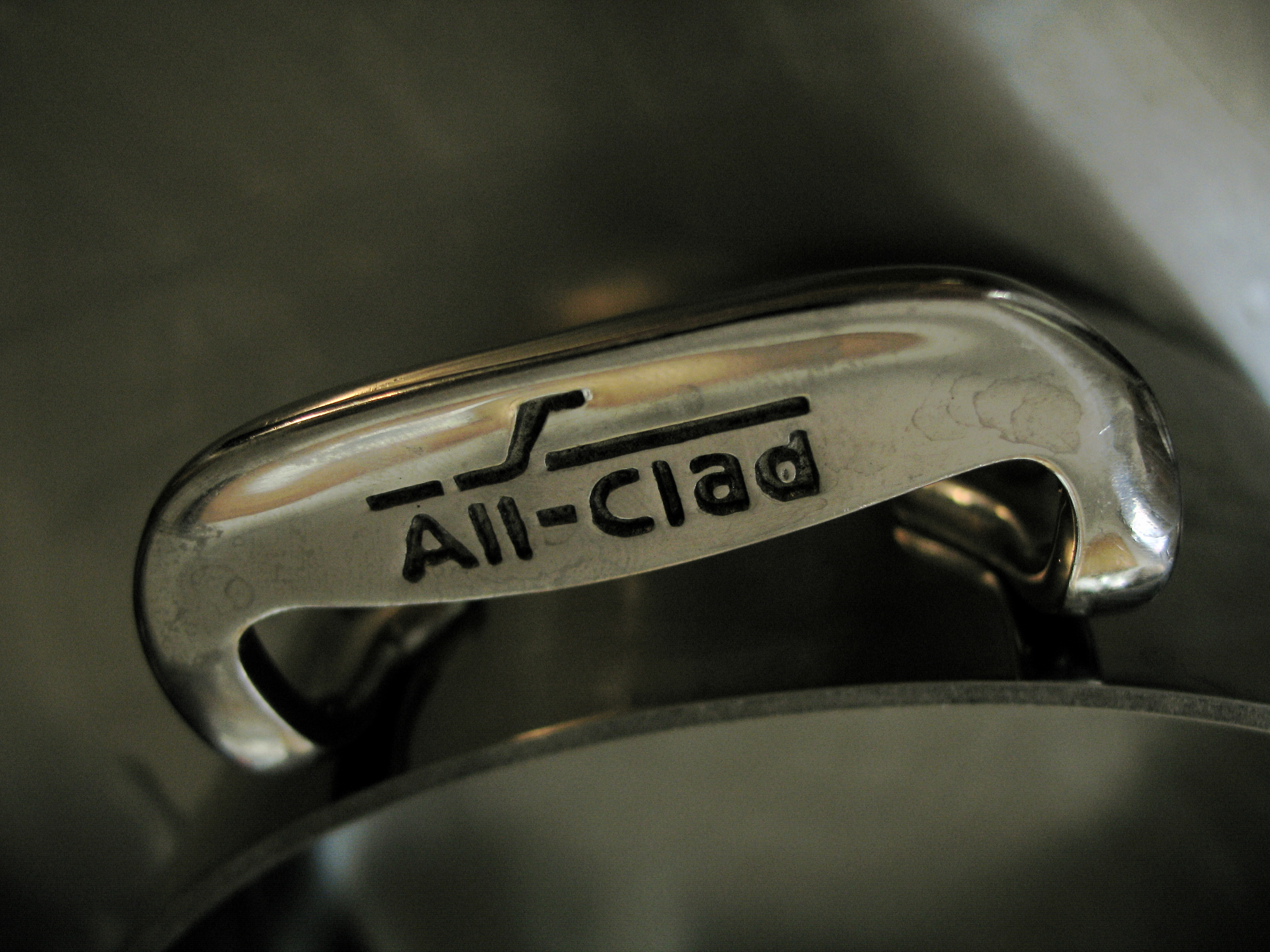
All-Clad handles

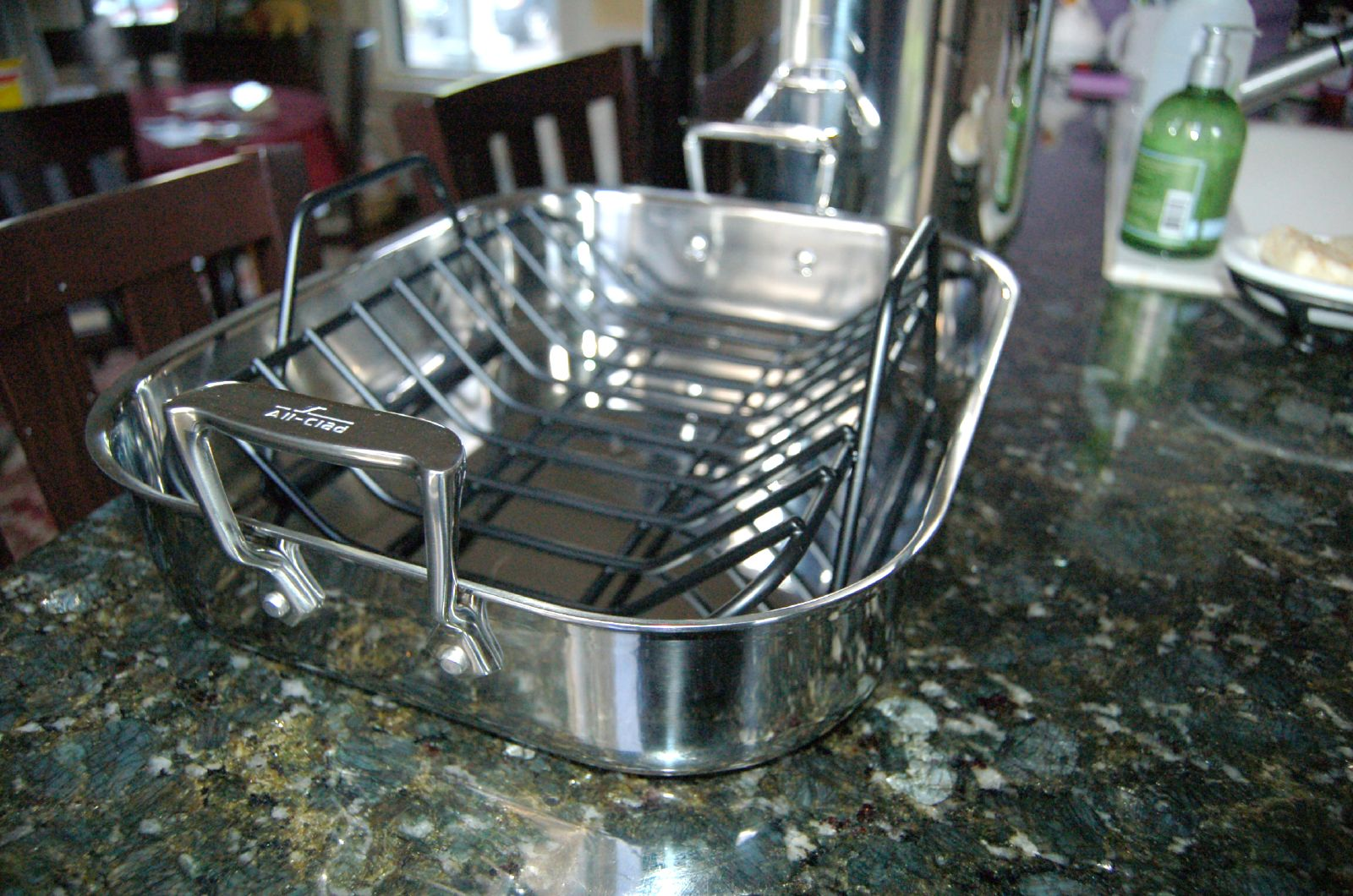
All-Clad roasting pan

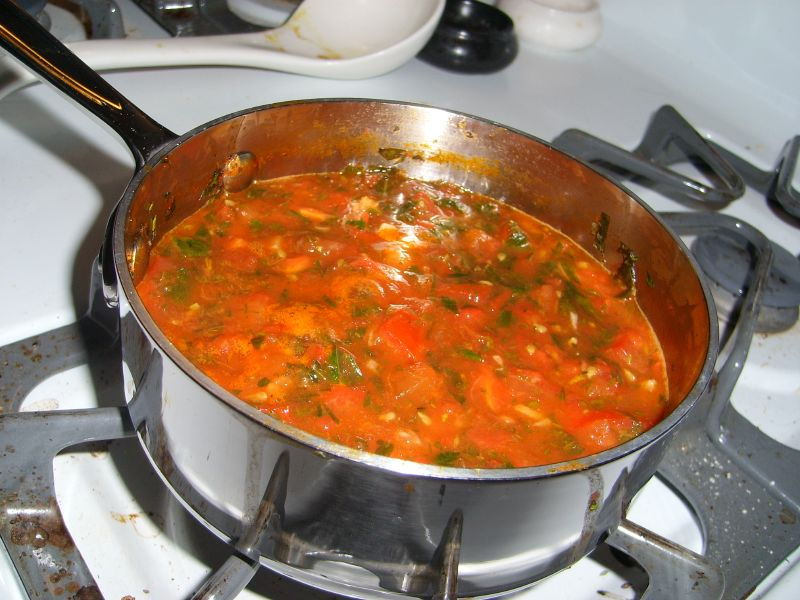
With sauce

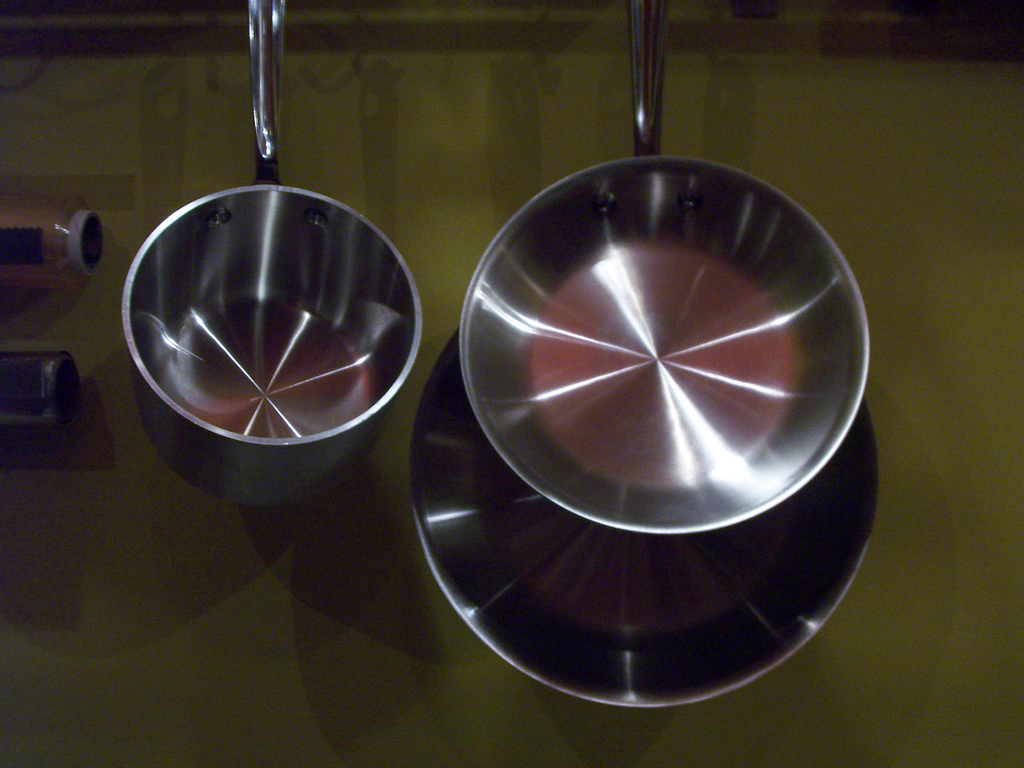
Hanging pans
