= Groupe SEB =

French consortium

SEB S.A.

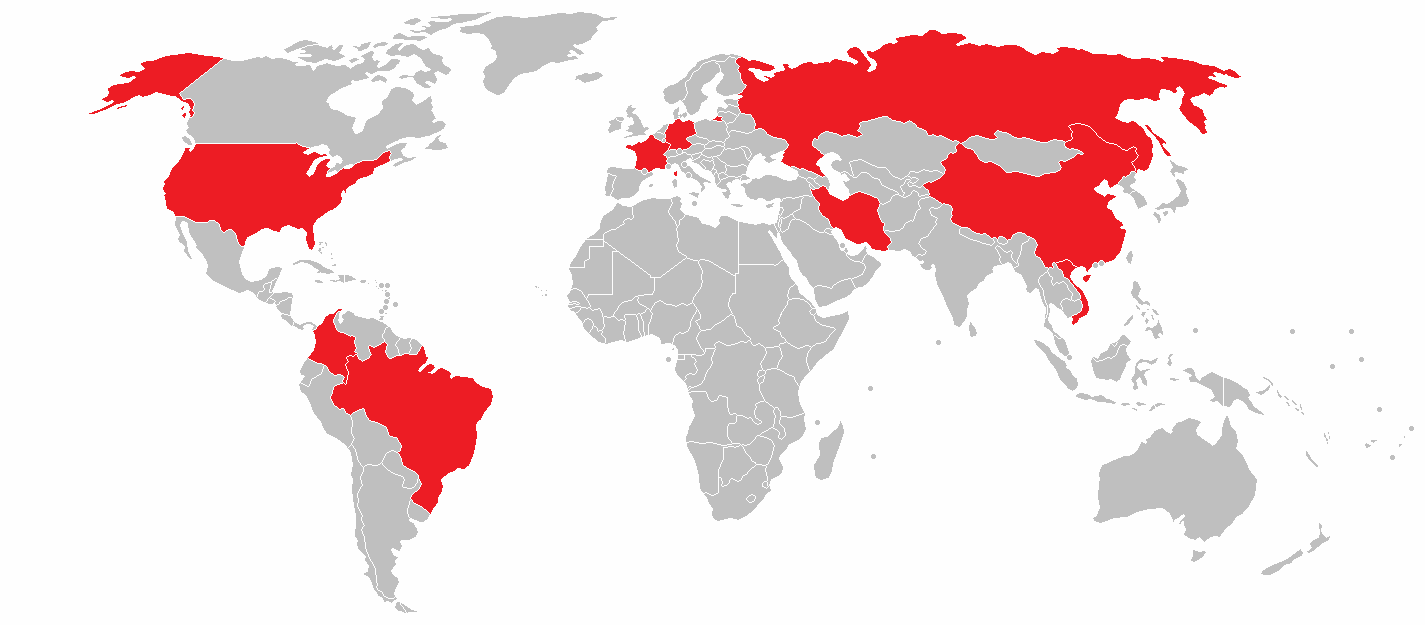
- Type: Société anonyme
- Traded as: Euronext Paris: SK; CAC Mid 60 Component
- Industry: Small appliances
- Founded: 1857; 169 years ago
- Headquarters: Écully, France
- Area served: Worldwide
- Key people: Thierry de La Tour d'Artaise (Chairman)
- Revenue: ▲€8.0 billion (2023)
- Net income: ▲€386 million (2023)
- Number of employees: 34,263 (2019)
- Subsidiaries: All-Clad; Emsa (company); Krampouz; Krups; Lagostina; Mirro; Moulinex; OBH Nordica; Rowenta; Schaerer; Supor; Tefal/T-fal; WearEver; WMF Group; Joven Electric Co. Sdn Bhd
- Website: groupeseb.com

SEB S.A. or better known as Groupe SEB (Société d'Emboutissage de Bourgogne) is a large French consortium that produces small appliances, and it is the world's largest manufacturer of cookware. Notable brand names associated with Groupe SEB include All-Clad, IMUSA, Krups, Moulinex, Rowenta, Tefal (including OBH Nordica), Mirro and WMF Group. According to the Groupe SEB website, they have faced considerable competition from low-price Chinese competitors, but have managed to maintain a constant sales level. A large proportion of their product lines are now manufactured in China. Its headquarters are in Écully, a Lyon suburb.

== History ==
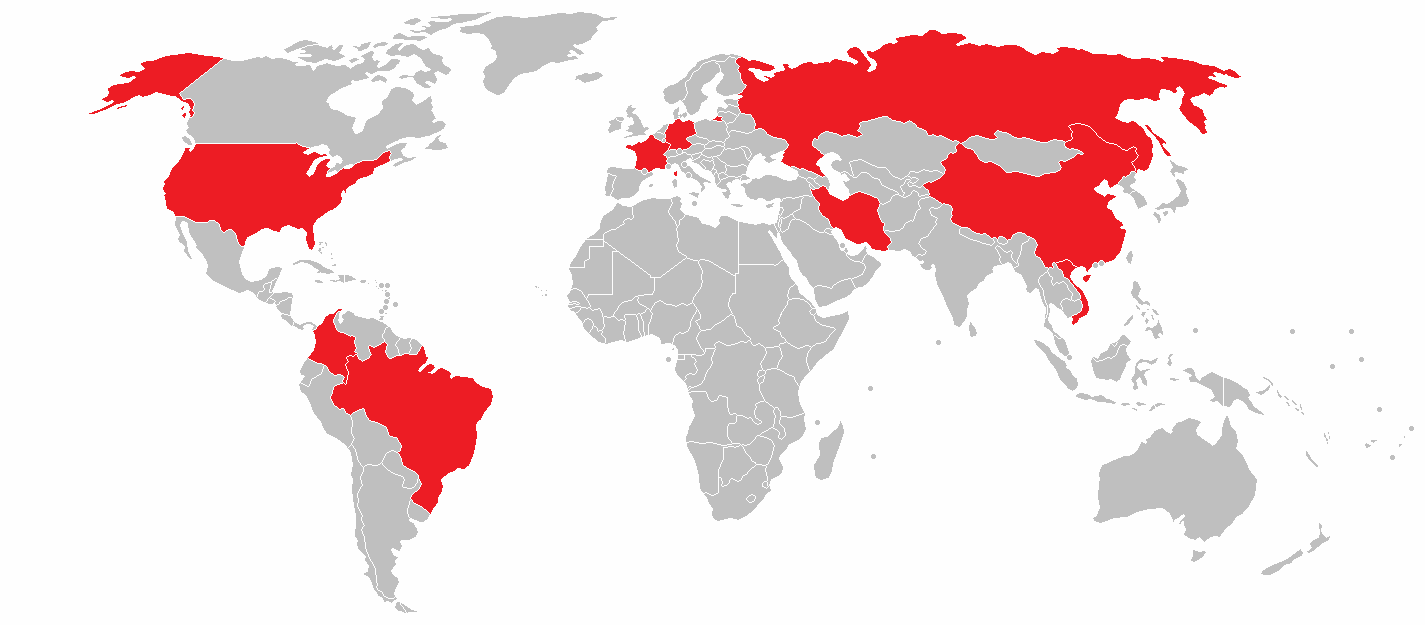
Groupe SEB plants around the world

The precursor to the Groupe SEB consortium was originally formed by Antoine Lescure in 1857. In 1977, they released the dedicated first-generation home video game console Telescore 750. Later, they released two revisions, the Telescore 751 and the Telescore 752.

== Recent performance ==
For the first half of 2008, Groupe SEB reported an increase in profit from 52 million euros in 2007 to 94 million euros. Groupe SEB now has a 61% interest in the Chinese cookware company Supor. For the second half of the year, Groupe SEB did not predict major changes in outlook.

In 2004, Groupe SEB acquired the high-end American cookware company All-Clad. Weakness in the European markets is expected to be balanced out by further growth in North America and Asia.
