= Louis-Frédéric Lescure =

French politician (1904-1993)

- Born: 27 May 1904
- Died: 5 December 1993 (aged 89)
- Occupation: Industrialist
- Title: CEO, Groupe SEB
- Term: 1953–1972
- Spouse: Françoise Helie
- Children: 11, including Emmanuel Lescure

Louis-Frédéric Lescure (27 May 1904 – 5 December 1993) was a French industrialist, and the CEO of Groupe SEB from 1953 to 1972.

== Early life ==
Lescure was born on 27 May 1904.

== Career ==
Lescure was the CEO of Groupe SEB from 1953 to 1972.

In the 1950s, Lescure launched the Cocotte-Minute, the first one-piece stamped aluminium pressure cooker.

Lescure was president of the regional council of Bourgogne from 1983 to 1985.

== Personal life, death and legacy ==
Lescure married Françoise Helie, and they had eleven children.

Lescure died on 5 December 1993, aged 89. His son Emmanuel Lescure later became chairman of Groupe SEB.
