= Supor =

Chinese home appliance manufacturer

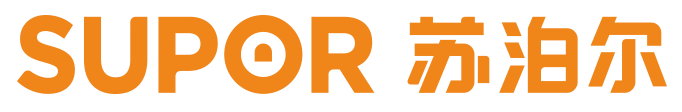

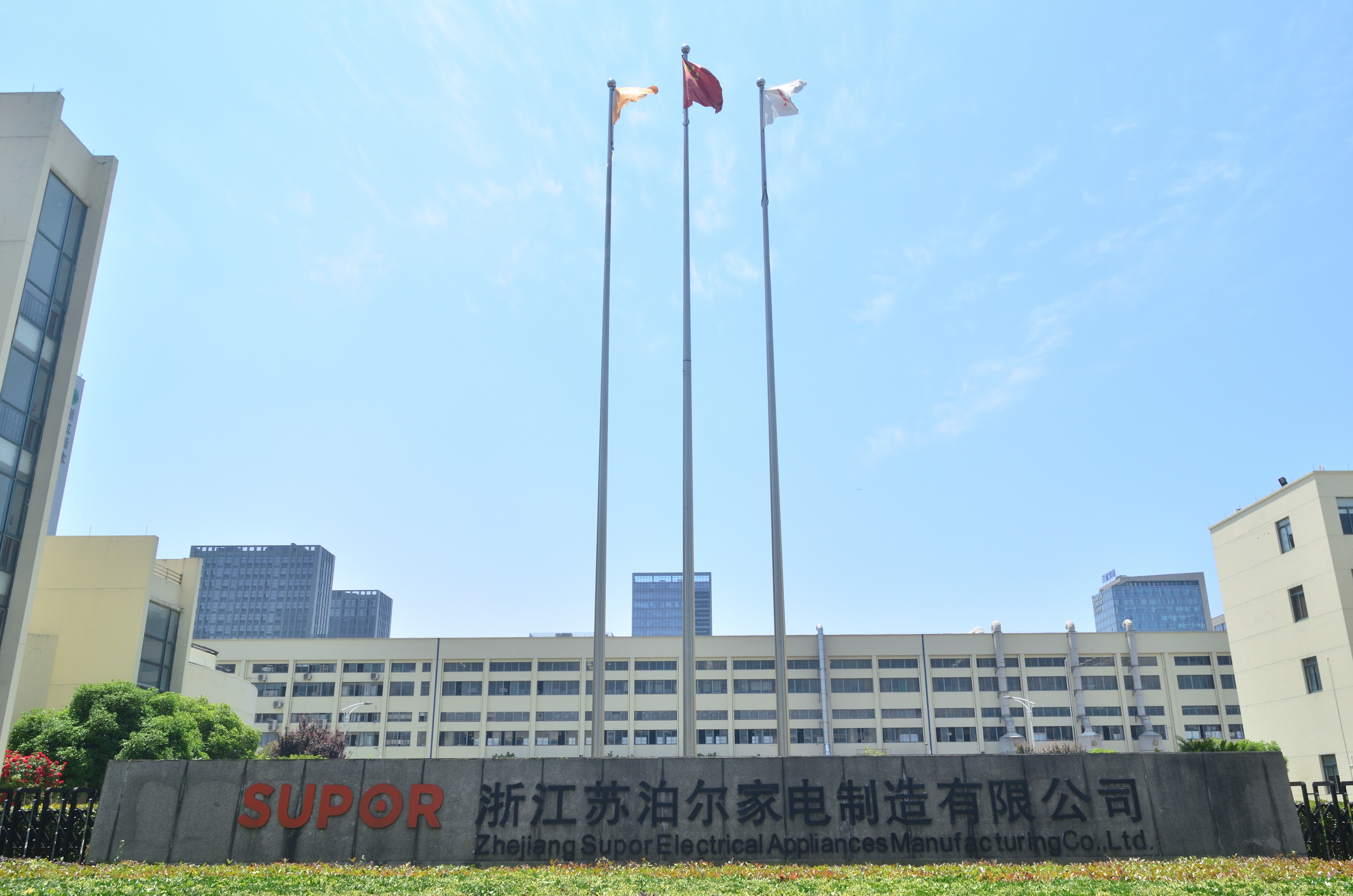
- Supor Hangzhou Office
- Native name: 苏泊尔
- Type: Subsidiary
- Traded as: SZSE: 002032
- Founded: 1994; 32 years ago
- Founder: Su Zengfu (苏增福)
- Headquarters: Binjiang District, Hangzhou, Zhejiang, China
- Key people: Su Zengfu (Chairman)
- Products: cookware, small appliances
- Revenue: ▲CN¥9.5 billion (2014)
- Number of employees: 10,000+
- Parent: Groupe SEB
- Website: www.supor.com

Supor
- Simplified Chinese: 苏泊尔
- Traditional Chinese: 蘇泊爾
Transcriptions
Standard Mandarin
- Hanyu Pinyin: Sūbó'ěr

Supor (Chinese: 苏泊尔; pinyin: Sūbóěr), full name Zhejiang Supor Co., Ltd., is a Chinese cookware and small appliances company, headquartered in Binjiang District, Hangzhou, Zhejiang, China. It was founded in 1994. In 2006 it was the largest such company in China. That year Groupe SEB, a French company, paid 2.37 billion yuan (US$296 million) to acquire Supor. It was the first Chinese cookware company to be listed on a stock market.

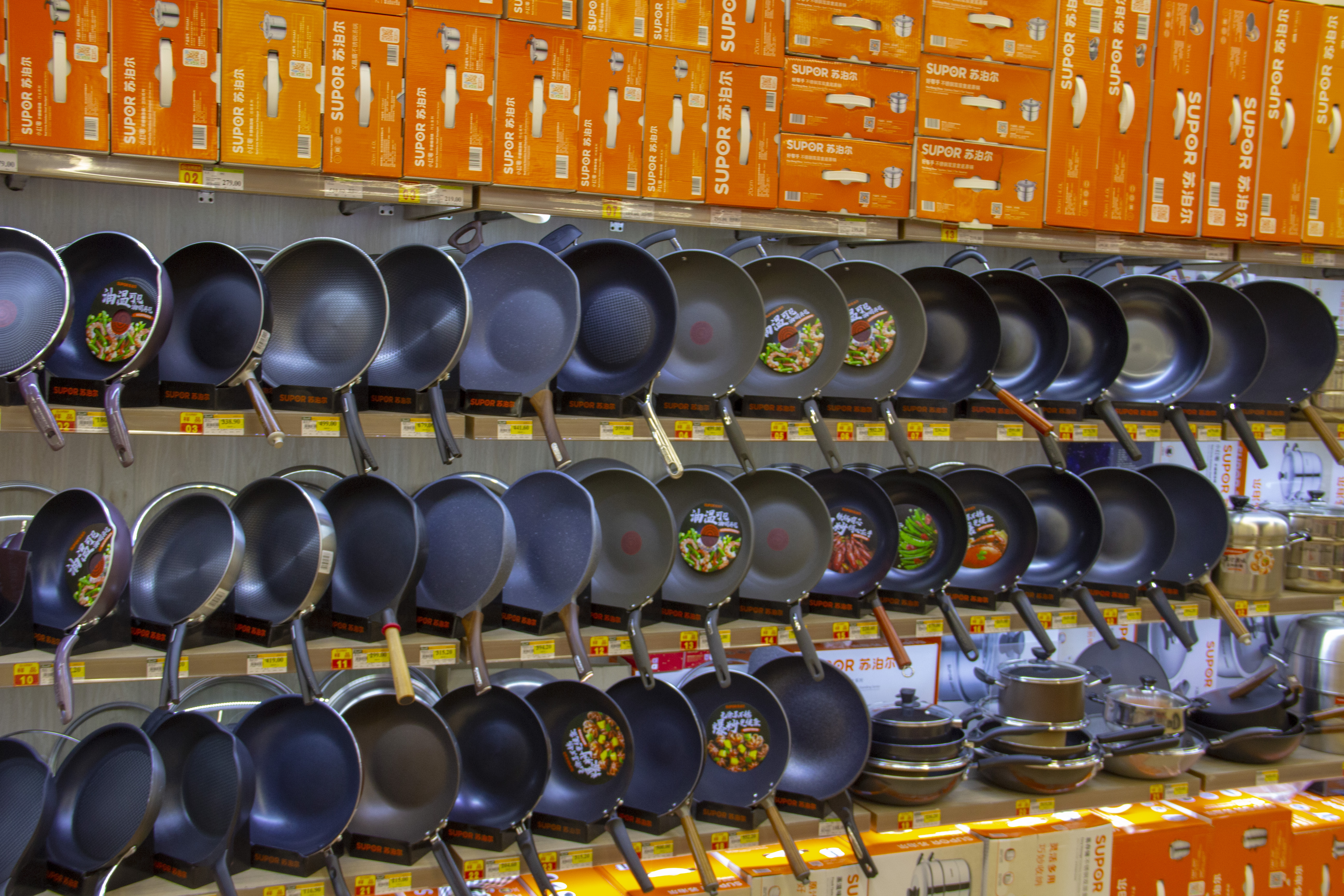
Supor pans in a supermarket
