= WMF Group =

German tableware manufacturer

WMF GmbH
- Type: GmbH
- Industry: Tableware
- Predecessor: Straub & Schweizer
- Founded: 9 September 1853
- Founder: Daniel Straub, Schweizer
- Headquarters: Geislingen an der Steige, Germany
- Key people: Oliver Kastalio (CEO); Bernd Stoeppel (CFO)
- Products: Cutlery, kitchen machines, coffee machines
- Revenue: total revenue Groupe SEB: €7.354 Mrd.
- Number of employees: 6,500
- Parent: Groupe SEB
- Website: wmf.com

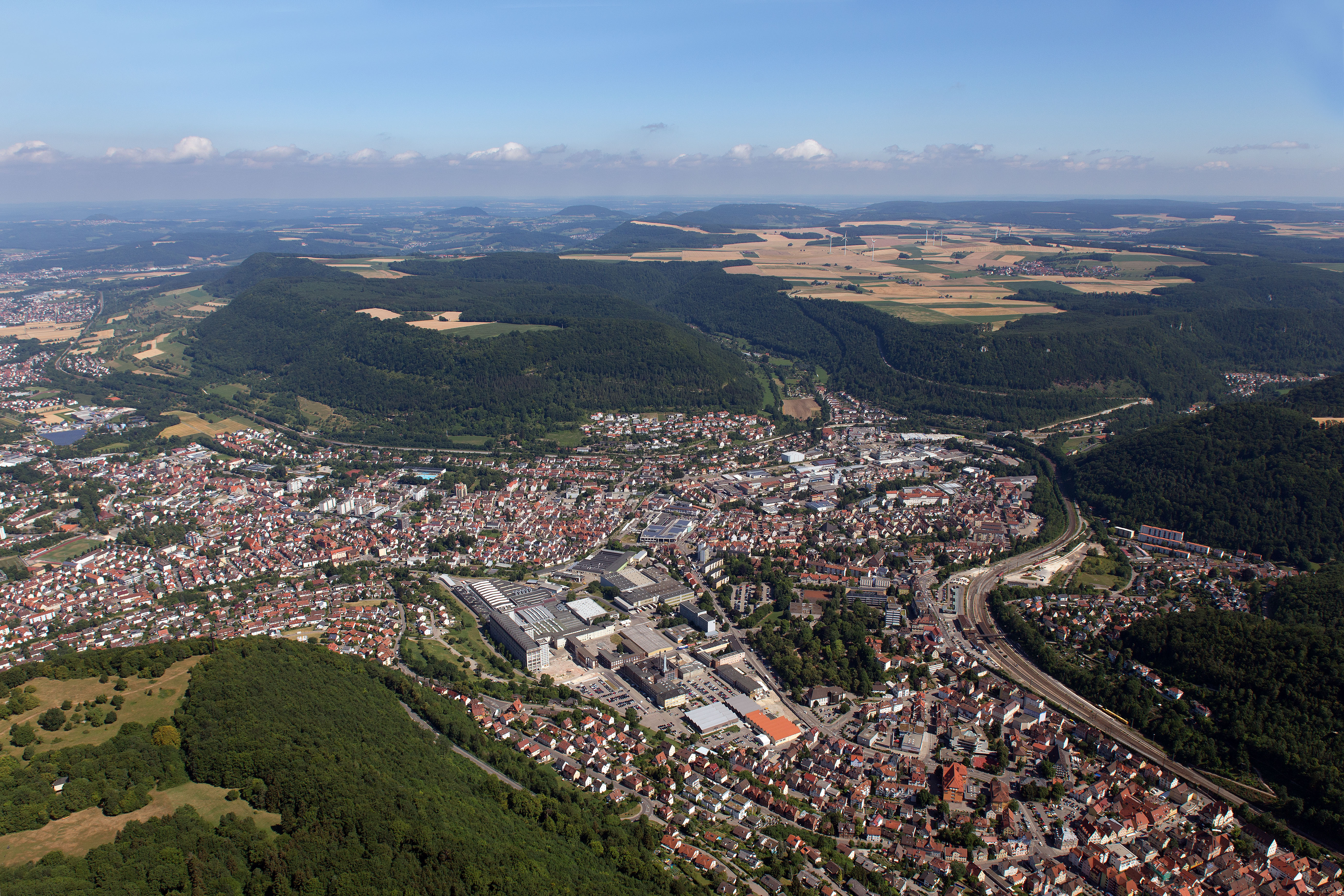
Aerial photo of the headquarters of WMF in Geislingen (2015)

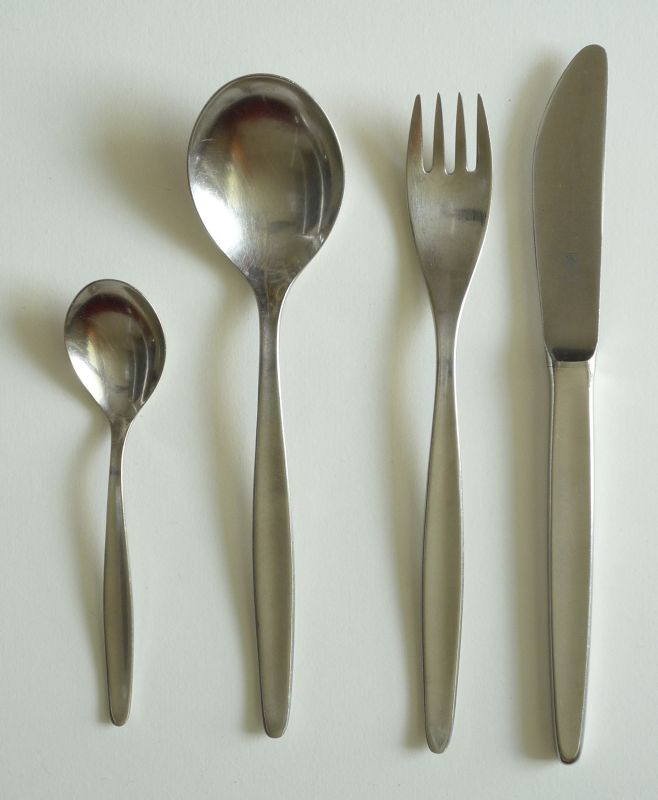
Stockholm cutlery designed for WMF by Kurt Mayer

WMF (formerly known as Württembergische Metallwarenfabrik) is a German tableware manufacturer, founded in 1853 in Geislingen an der Steige.

== History ==
WMF was originally called Metallwarenfabrik Straub & Schweizer and was opened as a metal repairing workshop. Through mergers and acquisitions, by 1900 they were the world's largest producer and exporter of household metalware, mainly in the Jugendstil, or Art Nouveau style, designed in the WMF Art Studio under Albert Mayer, sculptor and designer, who was director from 1884 to 1914.

WMF has been operating under the name WMF GmbH since July 1, 2012 – and no longer under WMF Group GmbH. Since 2016, the company has been part of the French Groupe SEB. The simpler name, WMF fits smoothly into the group structure while retaining its roots as a premium manufacturer within the group. The change is visible in the new corporate logo: this focuses on the WMF brand logo and visually creates a direct link to Groupe SEB. WMF also takes the new name as an opportunity to change the address at its headquarters in Geislingen. Thus, the previously known address "Eberhardstraße 35" became "WMF Platz 1".

In 1880 after Metallwarenfabrik Straub & Schweizer merged with another German company, it was renamed as the Württembergische Metallwarenfabrik. WMF acquired the Polish metalware factory Plewkiewicz in Warsaw in 1886, which then became a subsidiary of WMF around 1900. During this period, WMF employed over 3500 people. In 1890 they acquired the Kunstanstalt für Galvanoplastik München, which specialized in electrotyping and electroforming of statues and statuettes for buildings, fountains, tombstones, and gardens; this became the Abteilung für Galvanoplastik (Galvanoplastic Division) of WMF. During the 1920s, Abteilung für Galvanoplastic was producing reproductions of large-scale Italian Renaissance bronze works for an American clientele. Albert Weiblen Marble & Granite Co., Inc. of New Orleans pursued the acquisition of a gilt copper reproduction of Ghiberti's "Gates of Paradise". In 1910, the Reale Istituto di Belle Arti had granted WMF the exclusive right to take a sharp cast of the original doors, from which WMF created a reproduction that was exhibited at the International Building Trades Exhibition in Leipzig (1913). WMF produced a trilingual catalog about the doors, titled Erztüre des Hauptportals am Baptisterium in Florenz.

In 1900, WMF acquired Albert Köhler's famous Austrian metalwork company AK & CIE, who produced and distributed WMF items under their mark to the Austro-Hungarian market until about 1914. WMF purchased Orivit AG, a company known for its Jugendstil pewter in 1905, followed a year later by the purchase of the Orion Kunstgewerbliche Metallwarenfabrik, another German metalware company. WMF continued to use the goods from the acquired companies on their own markets, and conversely, they produced and distributed their objects under their acquired companies brands. One other brand they acquired was Radivon Bucarest, a company founded by medalist Theodor Radivon, producing identical art nouveau metal wares under the WMF name with the same model numbers.

During WWI, the WMF was responsible for producing arms for the German military and had certified to the Allied Control Commission that the tools used to produce these arms were destroyed. However, after Hitler's call for rearmament the company under the control of Hugo Debach immediately began to produce arms again. Debach died shortly thereafter. Beginning in 1940 the WMF began using more and more forced labor from Soviet prisoners of war in surrounding camps, these people eventually made up 1/3 of the firm's labor force. WMF also founded their own concentration camp in 1944 to detain and force over 900 Hungarian Jewish women to work for them.

In 1955, WMF started the production of commercial coffee machines. These products were designed for restaurants, military mess halls, cruise ships and other commercial applications.

Kohlberg Kravis Roberts acquired the company in 2012 and sold it to Groupe SEB in 2016.

The group holds six brands WMF, Silit Kaiser, Schaerer, Hepp and Curtis) is represented in over 40 locations worldwide and has almost 200 company-owned branches in Germany, Austria and Switzerland. The WMF Group produces household and hotel goods, including cookware, kitchen appliances, cutlery, drinking glasses and professional coffee machines.

== Brands and companies ==
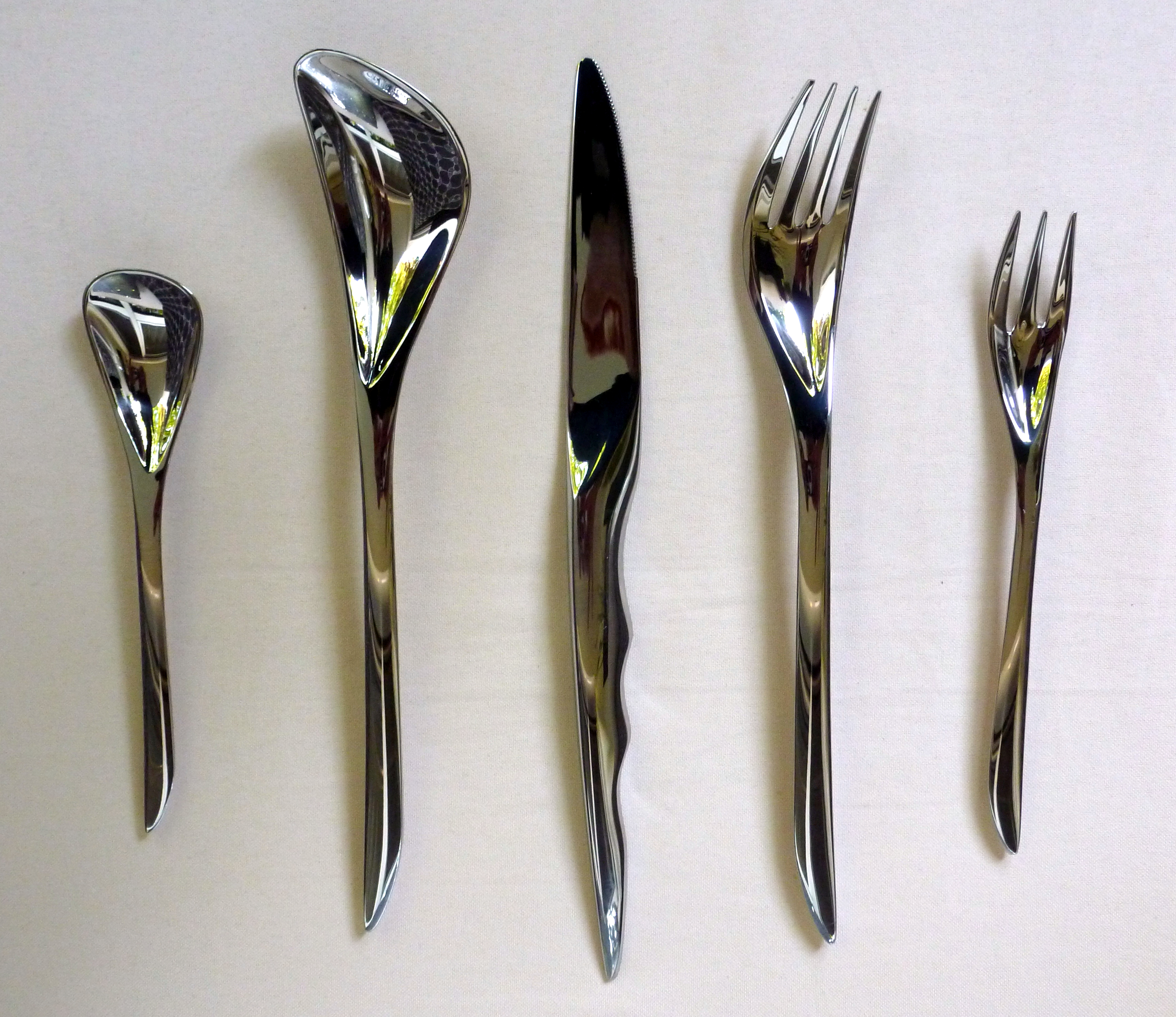
Cutlery designed by Zaha Hadid for WMF, 2007

The WMF is divided into three divisions: Global Coffee Machine Business, Global Hotel Business and Global Consumer Business with Tables & Kitchens, Branches and Small Domestic Appliances. In these segments WMF brands are offered to a different extent.

Some WMF stainless products produced in Germany after World War II are called "Fraser's WMF" because they were distributed in the United States by Fraser's Ltd. of New York, a retail outlet founded by Gordon Freeman Fraser in Berkeley, CA, in 1947. Fraser's grew to become a division of WMF of America, Inc., a subsidiary of WMF AG. With the death of Gordon Fraser in 2005, Fraser's ceased to exist, and WMF products are now distributed in the U.S. by WMF Americas Group of North Carolina.

Since 1998 the German cooking pan manufacturer Silit also belongs to WMF. Silit is still marketed as an independent brand. In 2002, the range of products is rounded off by the acquisition of Kaiser Backformen.
