= Lagostina =

Italian kitchenware manufacturer

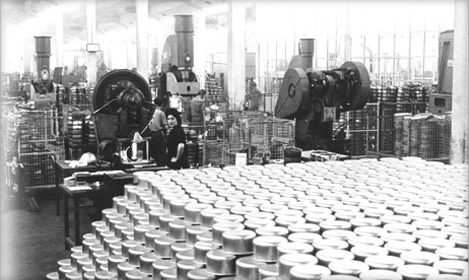
- Industry: Consumer Goods
- Founded: 1901
- Founder: Carlo and Emilio Lagostina
- Headquarters: Omegna, Italy
- Products: cookware, pressure cookers, flatware, tableware, kitchen tools, kitchen accessories
- Parent: Groupe SEB
- Website: lagostina.com

Lagostina is an Italian manufacturer of cookware, cutlery and other kitchenware including pressure cookers. Lagostina was founded in 1901 in Omegna, Province of Verbania, Italy, as a family business initially focusing on stainless steel flatware.

== See also ==
- List of Italian companies
