= Tefal =

French cookware and appliance company

- Type: Subsidiary
- Industry: Consumer products
- Founded: 1956
- Founder: Marc Grégoire
- Headquarters: Rumilly, Haute-Savoie, France
- Parent: Groupe SEB
- Website: tefal.com

Tefal S.A.S. is a French cookware and small appliance manufacturer, owned by Groupe SEB (a global manufacturer of cookware) since 1968. The company is known for creating the non-stick cookware category and for offering frying equipment with a low requirement of fat or oils. The name is a portmanteau of Teflon and aluminium.

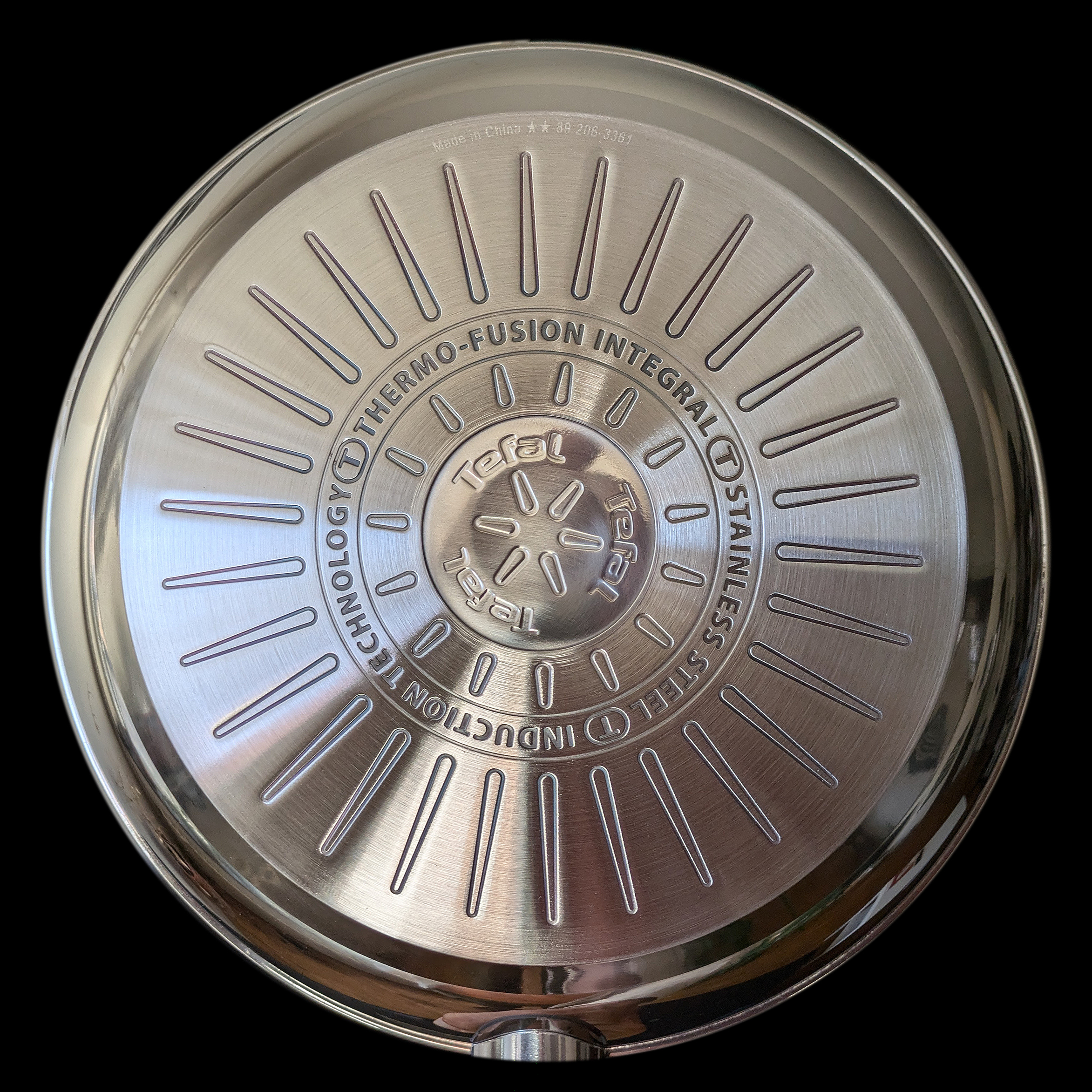
The stainless steel underside of a Tefal frying pan.

In the United States, Tefal is marketed as T-fal. This is to comply with DuPont's objection that the name "Tefal" was too close to DuPont's trademark "Teflon". The T-fal brand is also used in Canada, Mexico, and Japan.

Besides cookware and cooking appliances, the Tefal brand is also applied to home appliances such as steam irons and vacuum cleaners.

== Incidents and controversies ==
=== Influence peddling case ===
In 2013, a case of influence peddling broke out in Annecy, where Tefal management wanted to modify the employment contracts of certain employees, but a workers' union refused. The tug-of-war lasted several weeks, until the labor inspectorate intervened. The labor inspector in charge of the case discovered an irregularity in the 35-hour agreement signed thirteen years earlier and asked for it to be renegotiated, but management refused.

Philip Paillard of the Union des Industries et Métiers de la Métallurgie and Human Resources Director Dan Abergel decide to put pressure on the labor inspector to get her transferred.

Tefal management also contacted the intelligence services.

The inspector soon received pressure and threats from her superiors. The press revealed that the company had agreed to recruit a close associate of Philippe Dumont, the departmental director of labor, in exchange for putting pressure on the labor inspector on behalf of the company.

Tefal decided to lodge a complaint against the labor inspector for breach of professional secrecy and handling stolen goods. The Annecy public prosecutor, Eric Maillaud, a close friend of Philippe Dumont, decides to follow up the complaint, not against the company or the inspectorate director, but against the labor inspector and the whistleblower to "clean up" the labor inspectorate. On June 5, 2015, hundreds of people demonstrated outside the court in support of the labor inspector.

The trial is adjourned until October 16. At the same time, trade unions from the Ministry of Labor, local interprofessional unions and Tefal's CGT and FO sections call for a rally in front of the court.

In January 2016, labor inspector Laura Pfeiffer was awarded the "Ethics Prize" by the Anticor association for her work in this case. Nevertheless, in November 2016, she was convicted on appeal for breach of professional secrecy and concealment of confidential documents. In May 2017, journalist Inès Léraud presented a report on the case on the public radio program Les Pieds sur terre.

In October 2018, the Cour de cassation overturned the sentence and requested that the case be retried in light of the article of the Sapin II law providing protection for whistleblowers. The case was retried before the same Lyon court in September 2019, with judgment reserved until October 24 of the same year.

On October 24, 2019, the Lyon Court of Appeal, ruling on a referral, nonetheless confirmed Laura Pfeiffer's conviction for "concealment of breach of secrecy of correspondence and breach of professional secrecy", with a €3,500 fine and €1,000 in damages in favor of the civil parties. The Court did not uphold the benefits of the Sapin II Act and the resulting criminal irresponsibility, as the necessary criteria were not met in this case, in particular compliance with a "graduated procedure", disinterestedness, and "taking particular precautions before making public the subject of the alert": "By disregarding all the rules of investigation and professional practices applicable to all labor inspectors, and by knowingly concealing electronic correspondence, Laura Pfeiffer behaved in a manner that was not only hasty but also totally inappropriate".

=== Pollution scandal ===
In August 2022, the ARS (Regional Health Agency) of Haute-Savoie sampled drinking water in Rumilly, and discovered that the level of PFOA, a compound whose use has been banned since 2020, was 1.5 times higher than the maximum health value.

In February 2023, the newspaper Le Monde published an article on PFAS contamination at certain French sites, pointing the finger at the Rumilly production site and highlighting the massive contamination of groundwater in the area. Former employees accused the Seb group of "dumping its PTFE sludge by truck in what used to be a landfill site", which the group denied.

A month later, the prefecture and ARS of Haute-Savoie issued a statement advising people "not to eat fish caught in the Rumilly area".
