= Rowenta =

German home appliance brand

- Type: Subsidiary
- Industry: Home appliances
- Founded: 1884
- Founder: Robert Weintraud
- Headquarters: Erbach im Odenwald, Germany
- Area served: Worldwide
- Products: Electrical appliances
- Parent: Groupe SEB
- Website: rowenta.com

Rowenta is a German brand that offers small household appliances. Since 1988, it has been part of the global French Groupe SEB.

== History ==
Robert Ferdinand August Weintraud (1860–1927) founded "Robert Weintraud GmbH & Co. KG" in 1884, and trademarked the brand name Rowenta, an amalgamation of the founder's full name, in December 1909. His family lived in Offenbach am Main, in Hesse, then German Empire, where also was built the first factory of the company. The headquarters were located exactly off the B43 next to the A661 bridge over the river Main, in the Gewerbegebiet Kaiserlei ("Industrial Park of Kaiserlei", a quarter of Offenbach).

Rowenta was bought by the French Groupe SEB in 1988, so the corporation trades as "Rowenta Werke GmbH" since then, i.e. as the German subsidiary of the French conglomerate, named "Groupe SEB Deutschland". In 1997 the Offenbach factory closed, shifting all the headquarters and the production to that of Erbach im Odenwald, in the Odenwaldkreis district, also in Hesse, which has opened in 1959 and closed in 2022.

The first slogan initially used by the company was Muss heute eine Rowenta sein ("Today [it] must be a Rowenta"), later followed by Fortschritt mit Herz und Verstand ("Progress with the heart and the mind") in 1971; and furthermore Rowenta, for those who don't settle from 1985, Rowenta for life until 1993, Immer besser! ("Always better!") in 1995, and Enjoy Technology since 2014.

=== Product introductions ===
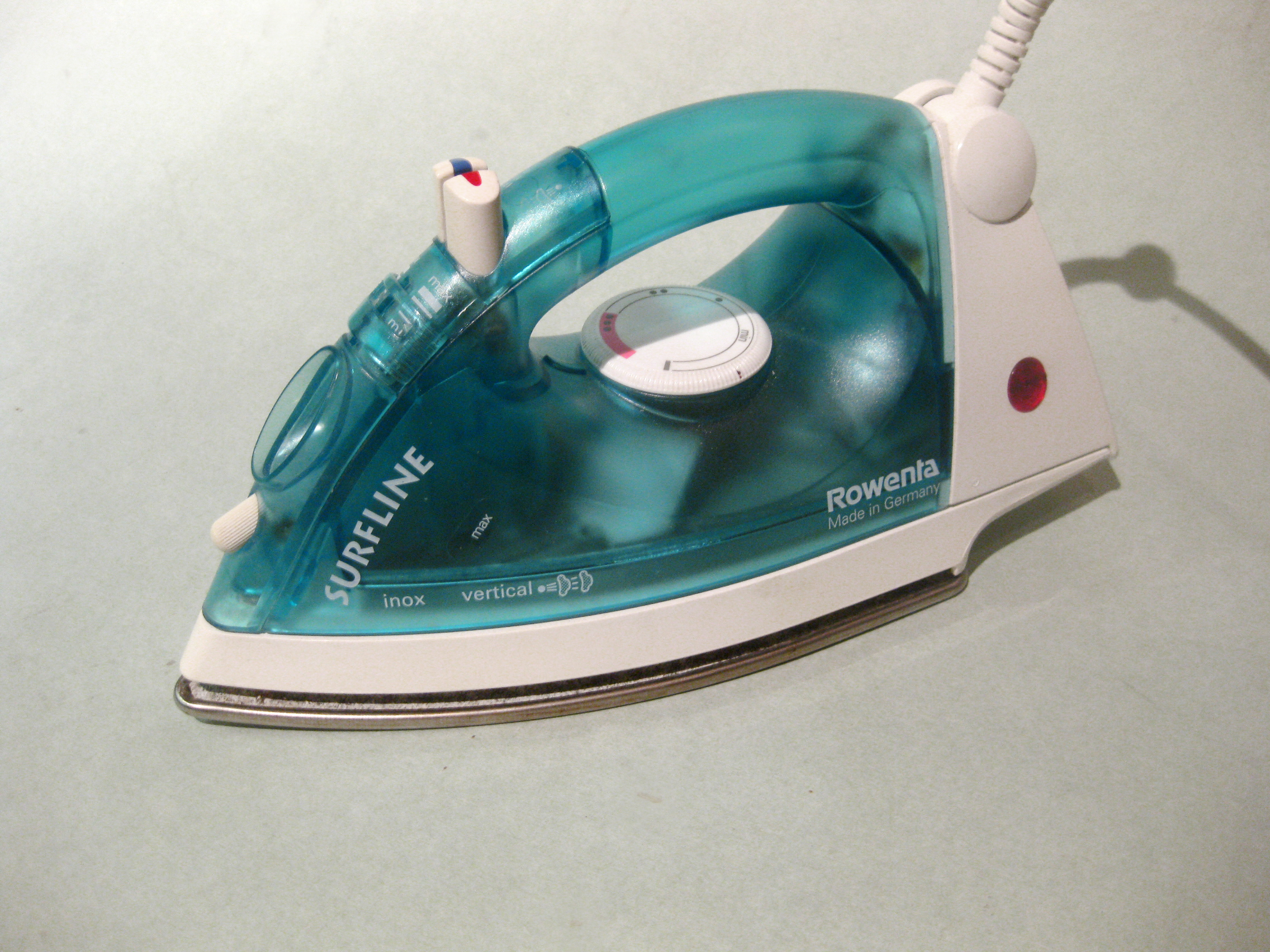
A Rowenta iron

- 1919 - its first electric iron
- 1926 - its first electric coffeemaker for restaurants
- 1949 - its first iron with a thermostat (with ceramic heating elements)
- 1957 - its first steam iron
- 1967 - its first hair drying bonnet
- 1971 - its first KG-22 coffeemaker (Filtermatic)
- 1974 - its first vacuum cleaner
- 2001 - its first bagless vacuum cleaner (Infinium)
- 2005 - its first hair straightener (intelligent beauty)
