= Salad spinner =

Kitchen tool for drying salad greens

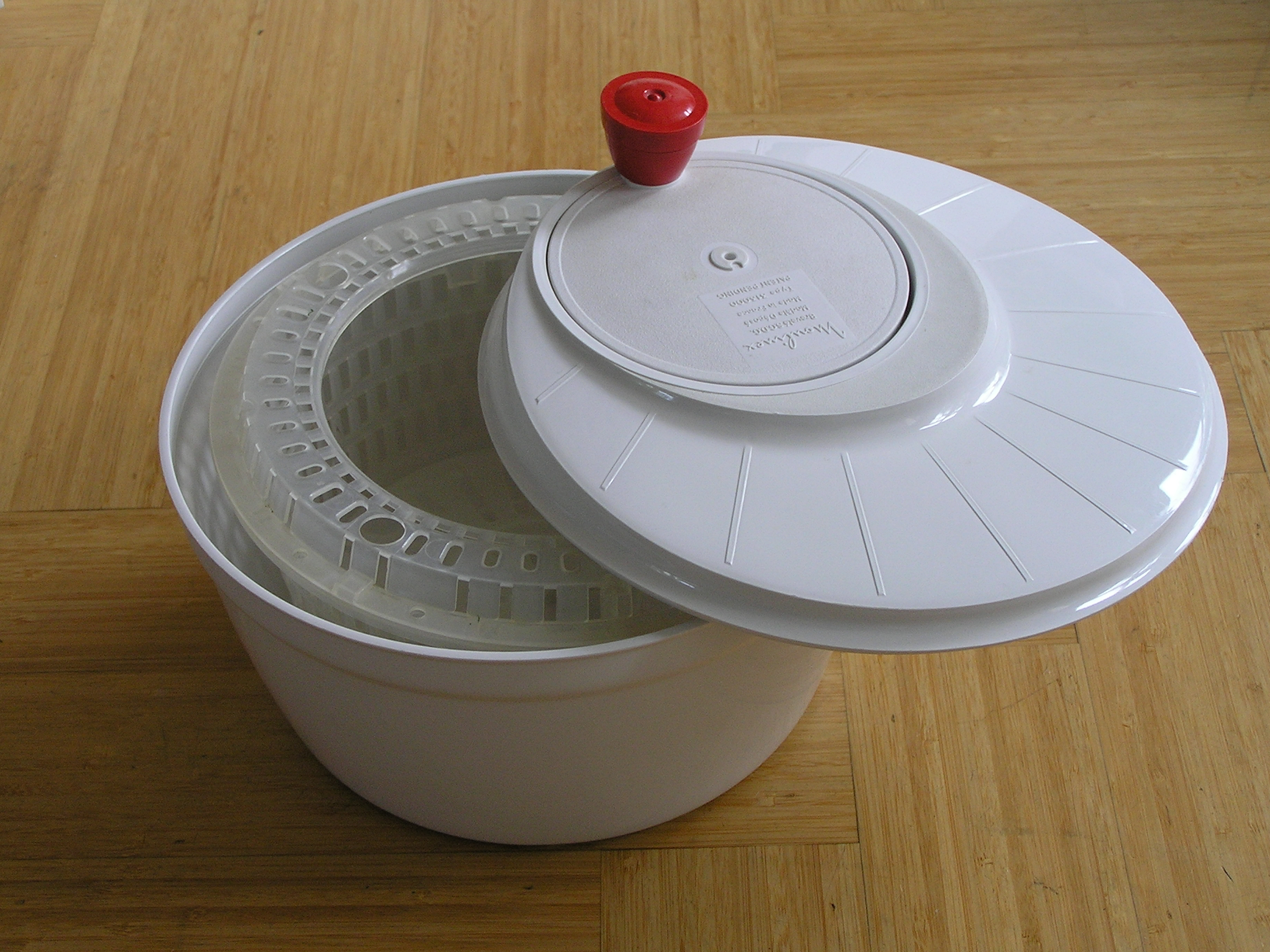
A Moulinex crank-operated spinner

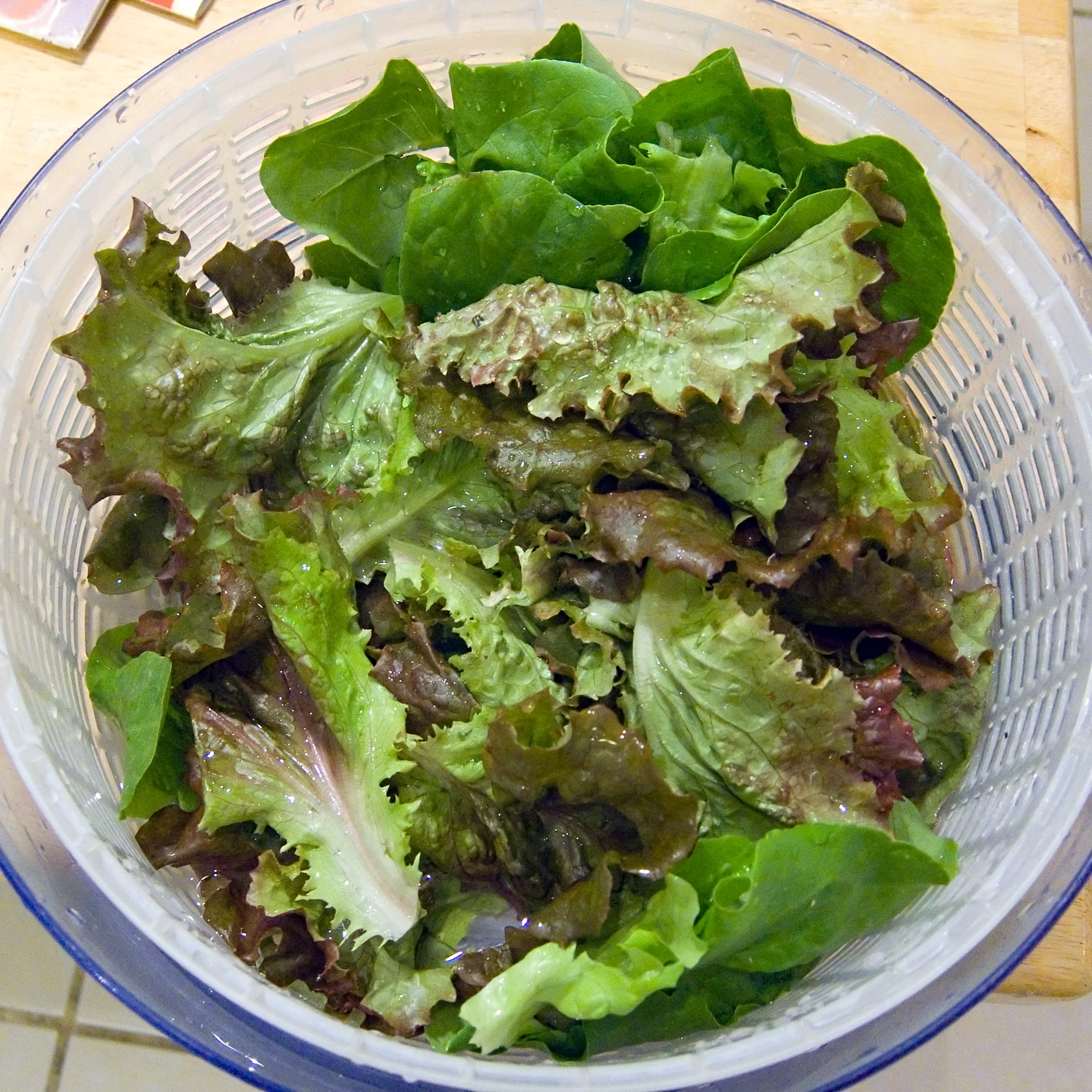
Interior colander filled with lettuces

A salad spinner, also known as a salad tosser, is a kitchen tool used to wash and remove excess water from salad greens. It uses centrifugal force to separate the water from the leaves, enabling salad dressing to stick to the leaves without dilution.

Salad spinners are usually made from plastic and include an outer bowl with an inner removable colander or strainer basket. A cover, which fits around the outside bowl, contains a spinning mechanism that when initiated causes the inside strainer to rotate rapidly. The water is driven through the slits in the basket into the outer bowl. There are a number of different mechanisms used to operate the device, including crank handles, push buttons and pull-cords. The salad spinner is generally easy to use, though its large and rigid shape has been criticized by food editor Leanne Kitchen and Herald-Journal reporter Mary Hunt. A salad spinner is often considered bulky and difficult to store.

Although devices used to wash, dry and spin salad have long been in existence, including one from the 19th century, the modern mechanism-operated spinner originated in the early 1970s. In 1974, the Mouli Manufacturing Co. introduced a crank-operated salad spinner to the American market; other companies were not far behind with their own patented variations. The product sold favorably and demand was high, with stores struggling to keep it in stock. Despite the product's popularity, however, it was not entirely without criticism; some were skeptical about the necessity of "another gourmet gadget".

== History ==
Although the invention of the salad spinner is considered to be modern, earlier devices, including one from the 19th century, did exist and performed similar functions. When the salad spinner was introduced to the mass market in the 1970s, a number of other techniques and products were already available and employed for the drying of vegetables and salad. One such device was a wire basket dryer, in essence a collapsible colander, which could be shaken or spun to expel the excess water. This method has been criticized by some for its impracticalities and according to one writer, the process was "akin to standing near a dog that’s shaking himself dry." Another product was a wire lettuce dryer designed for use in the sink. A basket was fixed with suction cups to the bottom of the sink, and pushing a pump caused the basket to spin around a center post, often spraying expelled water on the operator. Paper or fabric towels were also commonly used for drying salad and vegetables after washing, however the method was perceived as time-consuming and costly.

=== Early patents ===
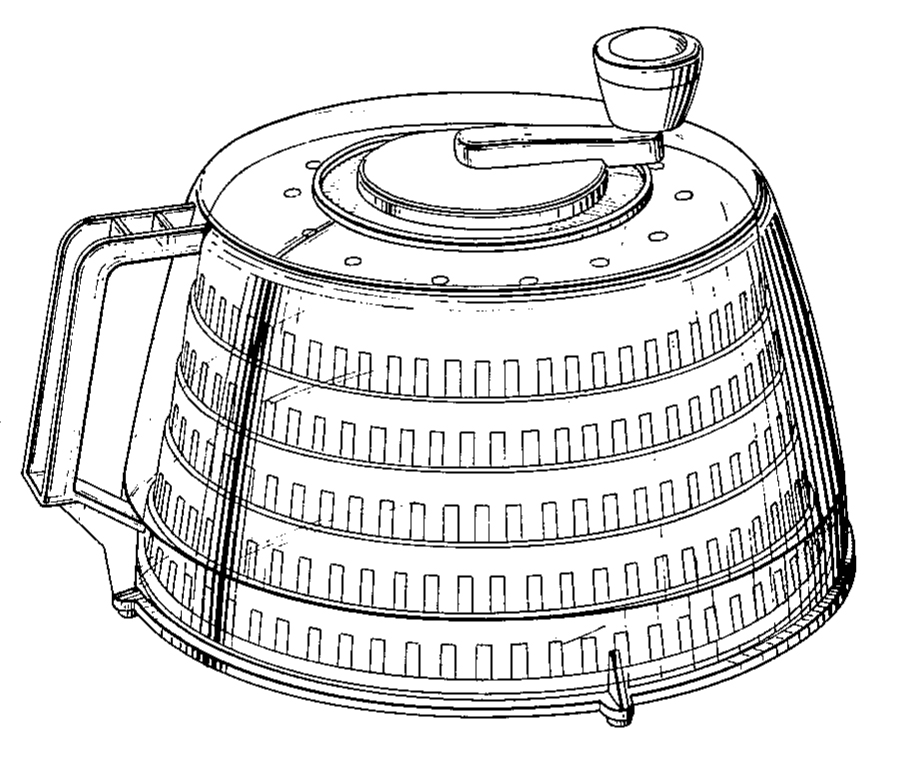
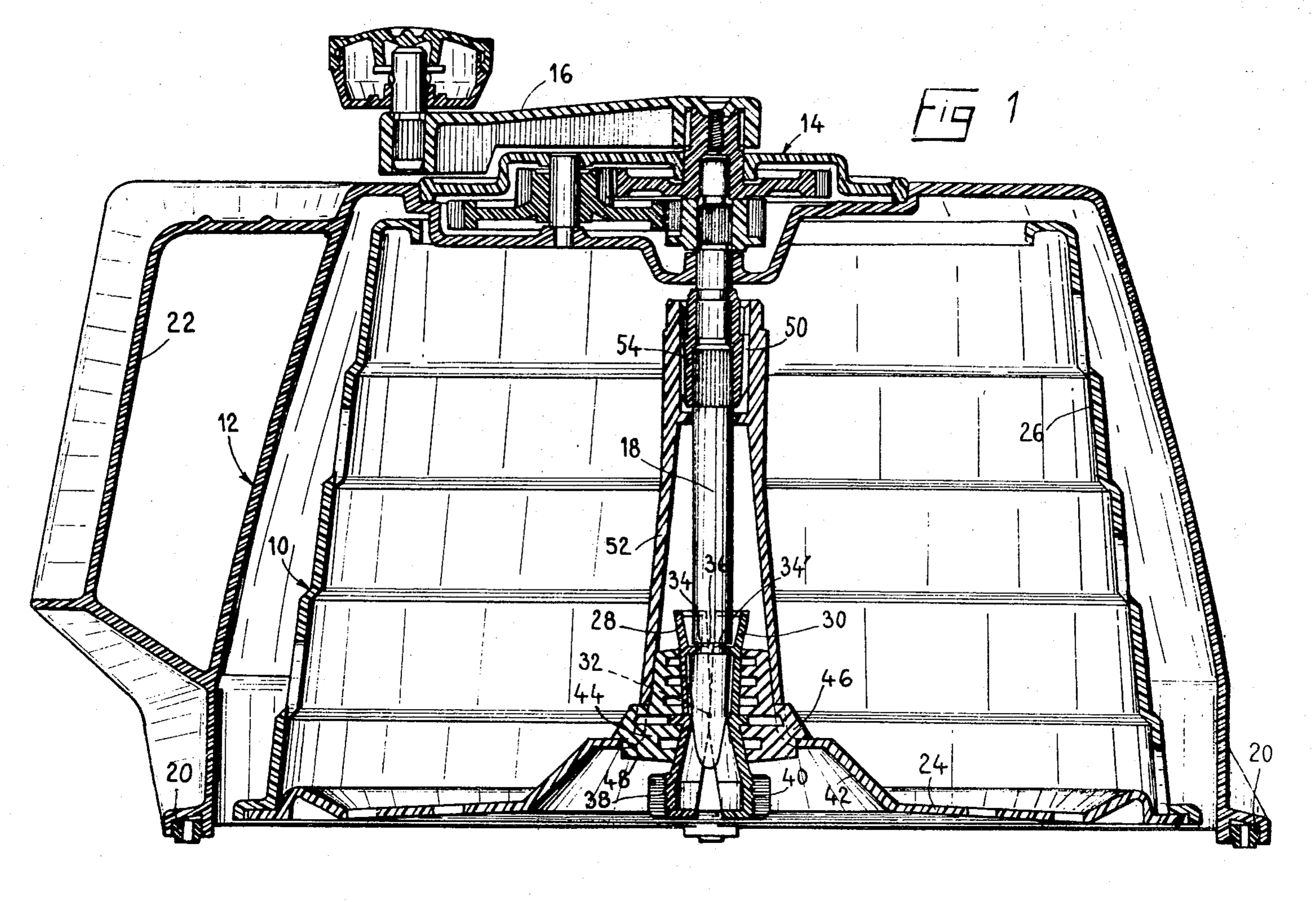
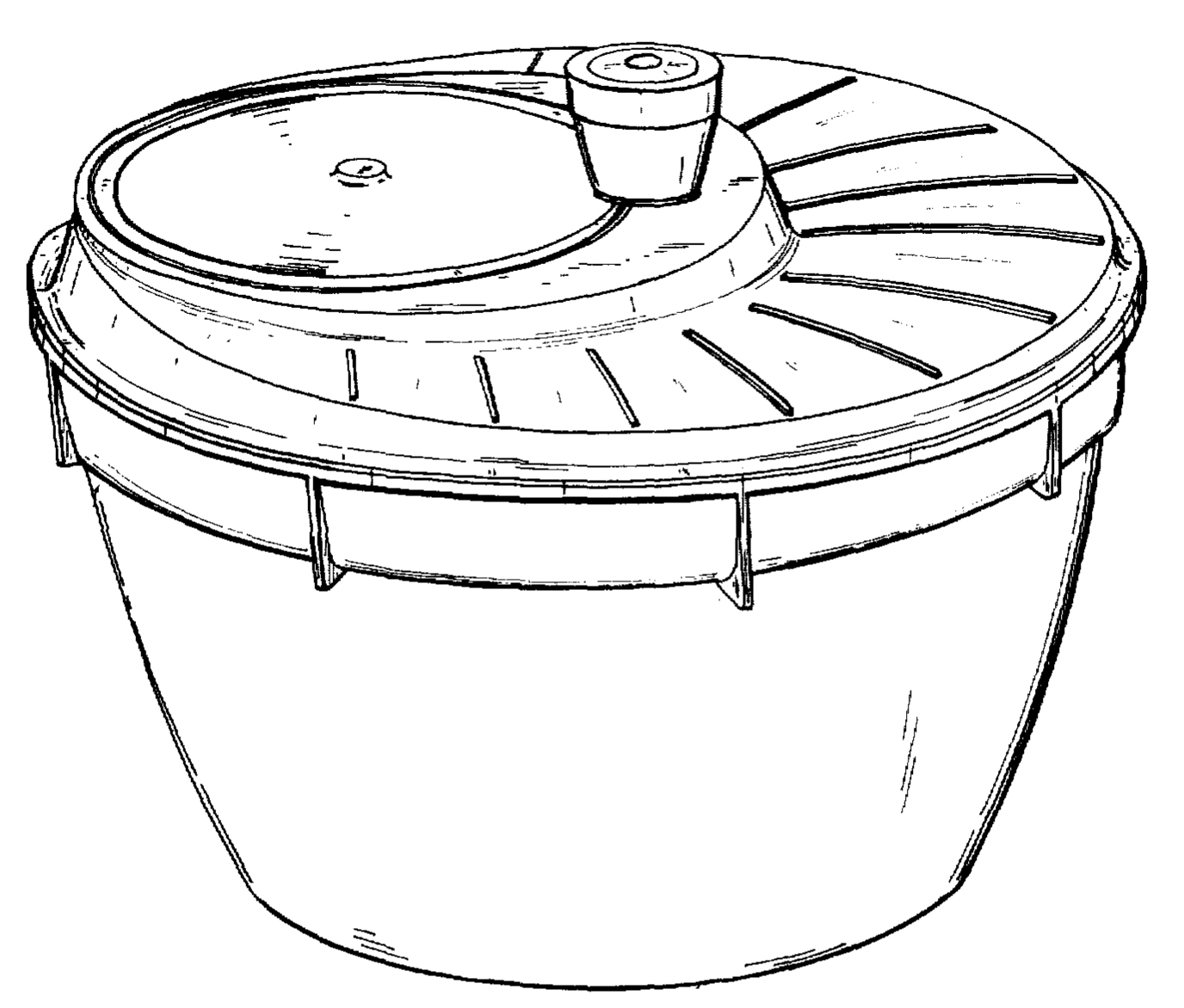
Patents filed by Jean Mantelet (from right to left): Salad Dryer, 1971. Household Drying Machine, 1971. Salad Dryer, 1974.
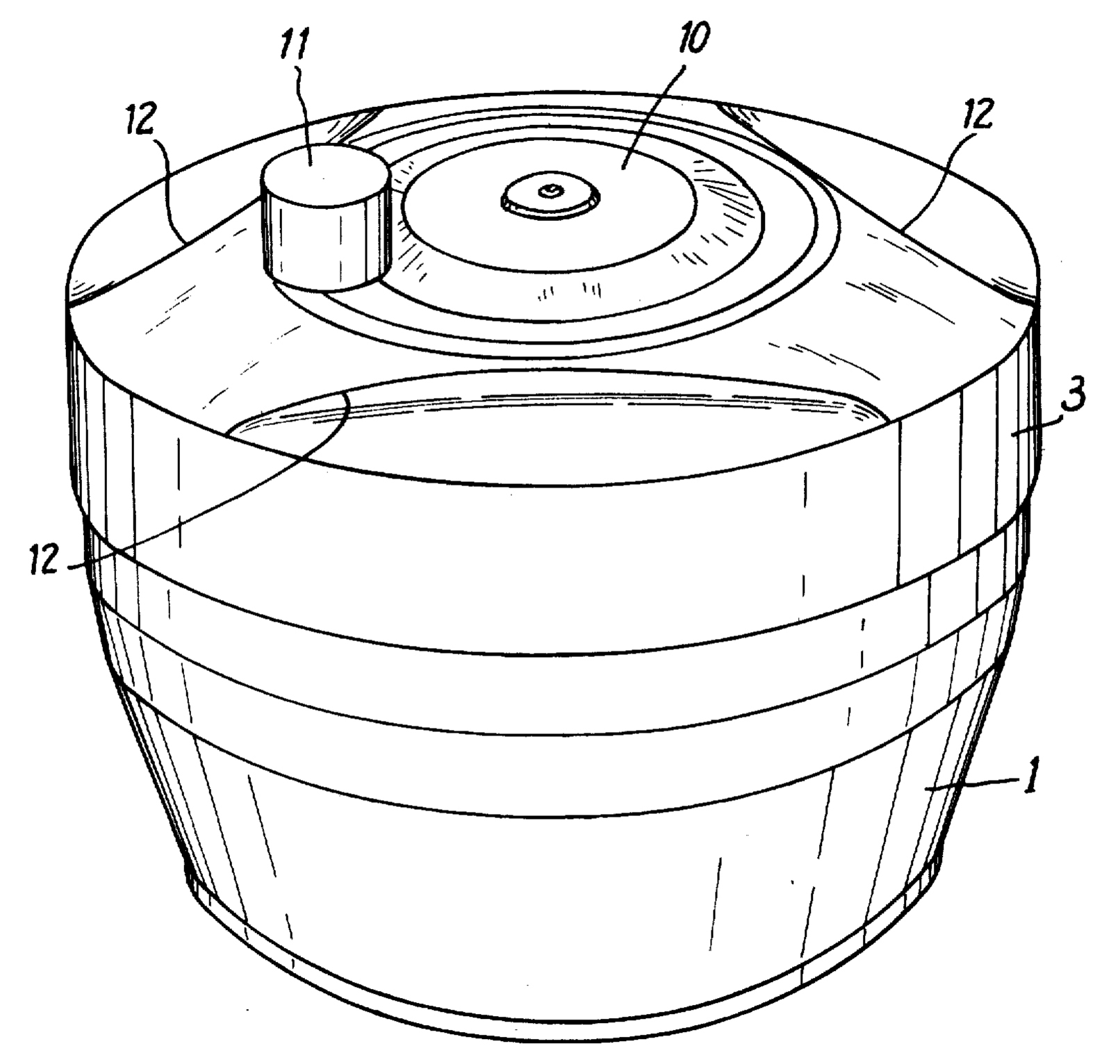
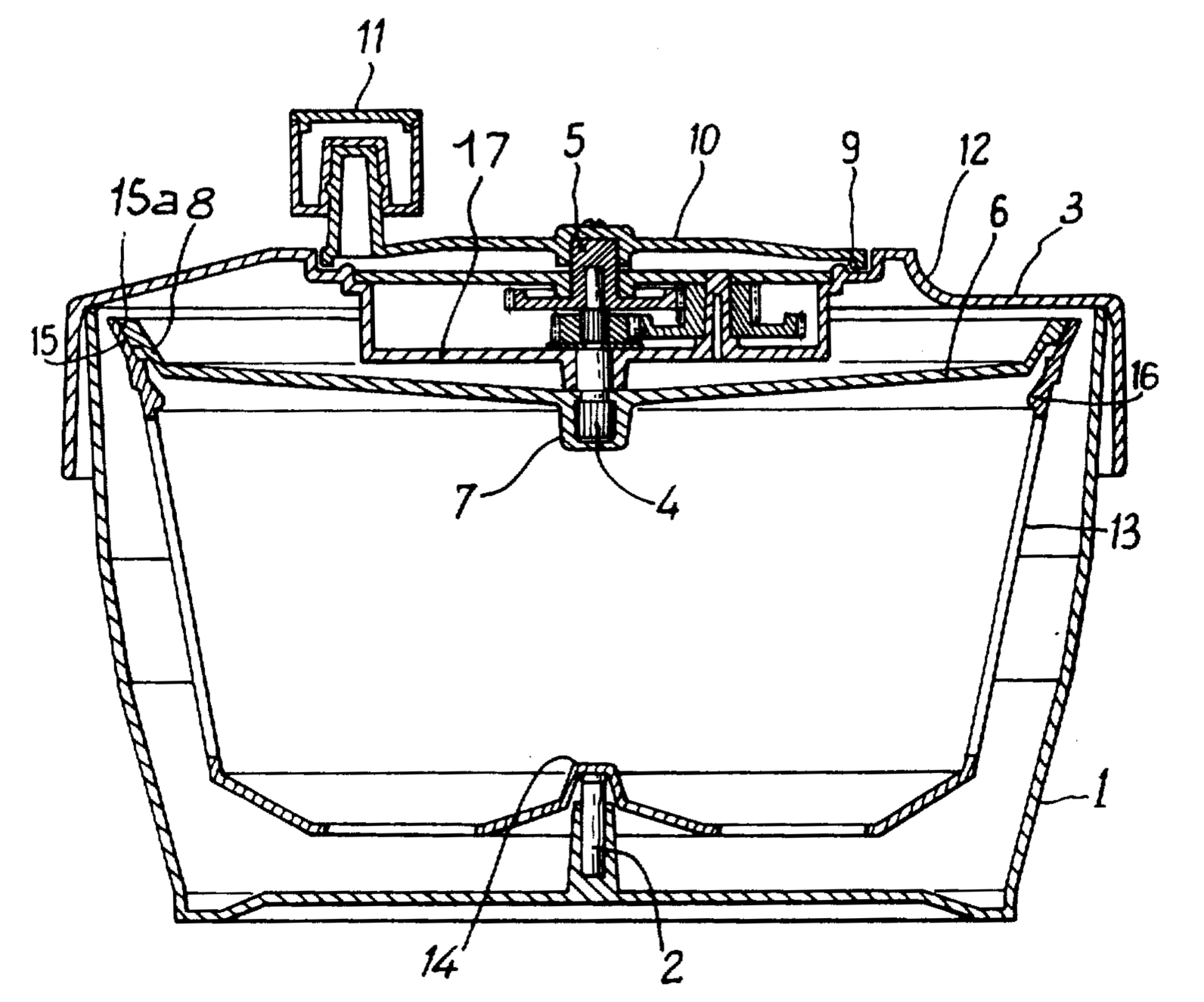
Patent drawings of Fouineteau's "Domestic Appliance for Drying Vegetables", 1973

In 1971, Jean Mantelet filed a patent for a "Salad Dryer," a hand-operated, centrifugally-driven device along with another called the "Household Drying Machine" which could also be used for salads. Mantelet was a prominent designer of domestic appliances and the founder of the French company Moulinex. He patented another salad dryer device in 1974. Mantelet was particularly proud of his salad dryer design. Of the new product, one user commented that, "it saves shaking my salad basket out of the kitchen window."

Gilberte Fouineteau, another French inventor, has been credited as the creator of the modern salad spinner. She filed a patent for a device in 1973. It too used centrifugal force to dry and drain vegetables and salads. The patent describes its difference being the removable basket and a lack of a central post.

=== American market ===
The Mouli Manufacturing Co., a kitchen supply brand, introduced the salad dryer to the American market in 1974. Others companies soon followed with their own, similar versions of the device. The salad spinner proved to be an immediate success however it was not without some skepticism. The product received criticism for being “another gourmet gadget” and the latest piece of “kitchen junk” to add to the growing list of new appliances which included hot dog cookers, cookie shooters and electric potato peelers.

“Salad spinner. Salad dryers. Lettuce spinners. Salad washers. Whatever they’re calling them, our group of paper towel diehards approached those plastic tubs with hesitance. Actually, for some, there was downright hostility.”

— Judy Hevrdejs, The Chicago Tribune, 1979

Despite reservations, the salad dryer was selling well in the American market. Over the five-year period since the product's introduction, sales of the dryer had quadrupled, with an estimated 500,000 units said to have been sold in 1978 alone. Cookware stores were unable to keep hold with demand and reported being out of stock of the device. The product even appealed to skeptics and was thought to be a time saver compared to the “tedious hand method of patting dry each leaf” that was known for leaving "soggy linen" and towels. A report at the time estimated that the money spent on a month's supply of paper towel reserved for drying lettuce could easily be enough to pay for a new salad dryer.

== Design ==
Salad spinners are usually made from plastic. The design is an outer bowl with an inner, removable colander or strainer basket. A cover, which fits around the outside bowl, contains a spinning mechanism which causes the inside strainer to rotate rapidly. There are a number of different mechanisms used to operate the device, including the use of a crank handle, push button or pull-cord.

Crank or handle
This is the original design, and still very popular. It works through a system of gears. The handle or crank is turned in a circular motion, which rotates a gear. This is connected to another gear that turns the basket. Critics describe it as "cumbersome", saying the motion is awkward. The crank style is thought to require more physical effort than the other spinning mechanisms.
Pull cord
Operated by pulling a cord. This type is thought to be gentler on the greens than the push button method.
Push or pump button
This spinner is operated by pushing down on a pump which initiates the basket spinning. There is a button which, when pressed, stops the centrifuge motion. There is also a lock to secure the pump down for easier storage.
Electrically powered
Scaled-up, electrically driven spinners are a more powerful version of the device. They are used in commercial or industrial operations and can spin many pounds of salad at one time.

== Usage ==
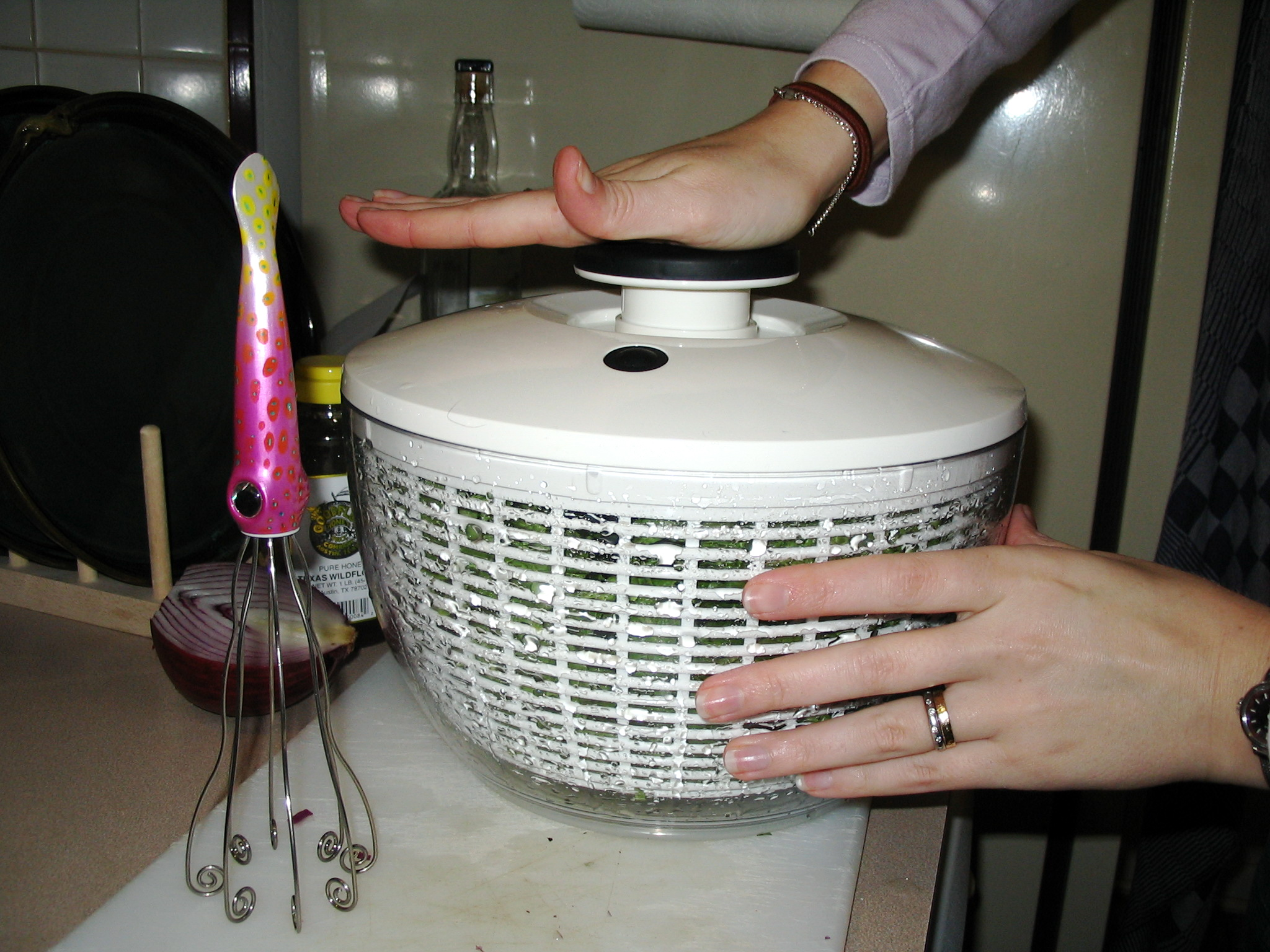
A salad spinner in use

Raw leaves in a salad need to be clean as well as dry. Salad which has not been properly washed can be potentially harmful, although generally the risk of illness is low. Listeria, E. coli, and other causes of food poisoning have been known to be present in unwashed salads. Costas Katsigris suggests that an increased rise in foodborne illness outbreaks has encouraged the use of salad washers and spinners.

Drying the leaves for the salad is important as salad dressings and oils do not stick well to wet lettuce or salad leaves. Salad greens left in water for a long period of time will go limp, and fragile salad leaves can be easily damaged and bruised if handled harshly during the washing and drying process.

The greens are placed in the colander section of the spinner and the container is filled with water. The floating salad is spun and left to sit before the water is poured out. This process can be repeated until no visible traces of dirt or sand remain. Once drained, the greens are spun, which generates a centripetal force that drives the excess moisture, through the perforation in the central strainer, to the outer bowl.

Salad spinners are considered to be an easy product to use and operate, but have been criticized for being bulky, space-consuming and difficult-to-store.
