= Patter (disambiguation) =

Patter is a kind of speech.

Patter may also refer to:

- Patter song
- Glasgow Patter (a.k.a. The Patter)
