= Zyliss =

Kitchen equipment manufacturer

- Type: Brand
- Industry: Consumer products
- Founded: 1951
- Founder: Karl Zysset (1907-1998)
- Headquarters: Zürich, Switzerland
- Area served: Worldwide
- Products: Kitchen Products and Gadgets, Knives and Cutlery, Food Choppers, Graters, Slicers
- Parent: DKSH
- Website: www.zyliss.ch

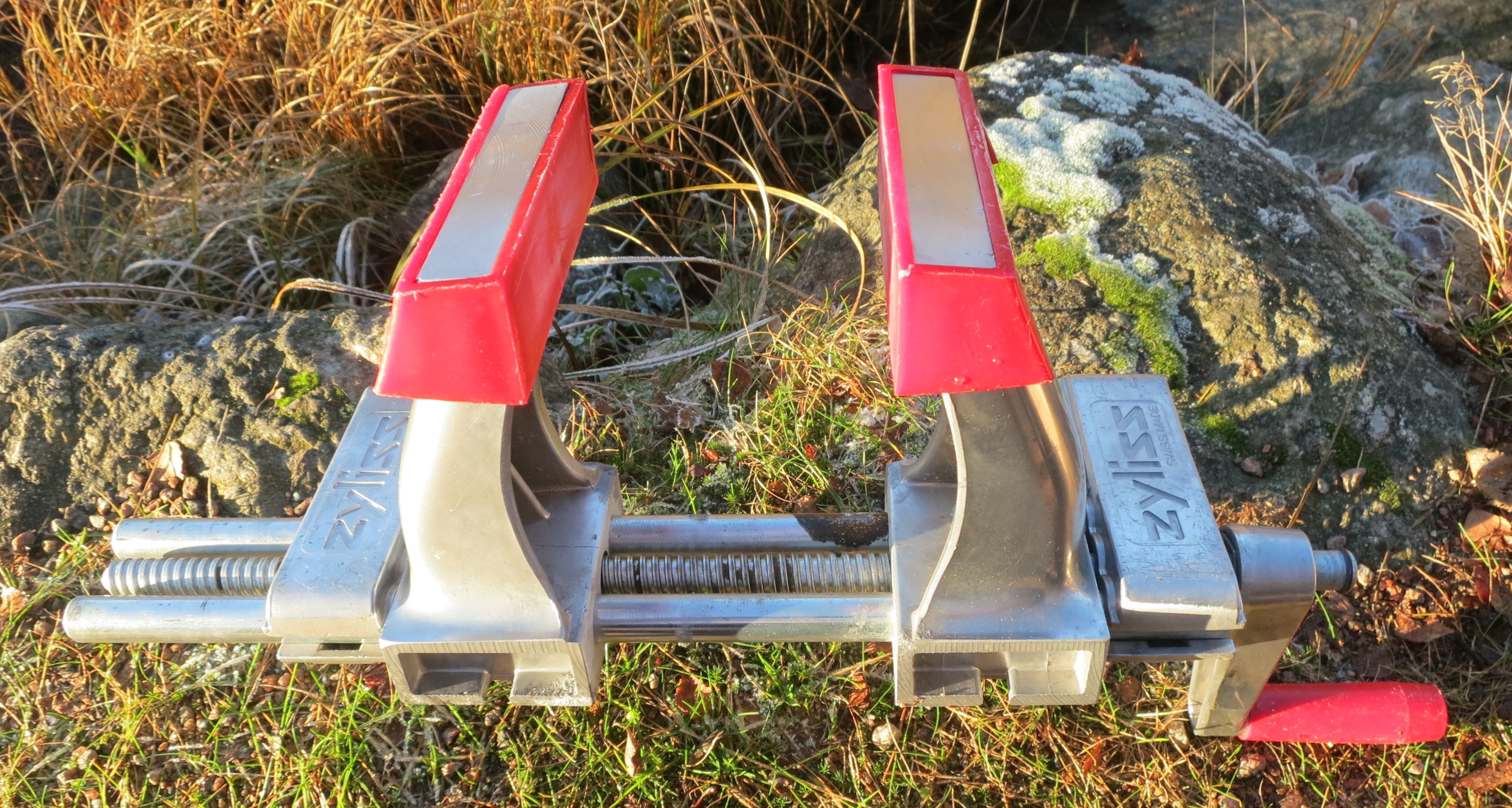
1990s hobby vise by Zyliss

Zyliss is a Swiss manufacturer of kitchen utensils. Originally a private company, Zyliss is now a brand owned by DKSH, a Swiss holding company.

== History ==
Zyliss was founded by trained bicycle mechanic, Karl Zysset (1907—1998) in 1951. The name Zyliss is based on a combination of the founder's surname and the town of Lyss, Switzerland where the first factory was established.

The company launched its first product, the onion chopper, with the slogan "Zig-Zig Zyliss".

== Timeline ==
In 1982, the company was sold to two investors who in turn sold the operation in 1985 to the Diethelm Keller Holding Group, now DKSH.

In 2001, Zyliss partnered with the design firm IDEO to develop a series of kitchen products that have gone on to see worldwide success.

In 2003, the company reduced its number of employees from 105 to 80 and the company's management announced that the production site of Zyliss would be relocated. After a protest in Switzerland the move was cancelled. Thirty staff of the fifty in the Swiss team moved to China during the mid-2000s. The headquarters were also moved to Zurich in December 2005.

In 2008, Zyliss partnered with the global design firm RKS Design to develop a new brand language including the Red Dot-winning salad spinner.

In 2006, the company, Zyliss AG, was delisted and was consolidated into DKSH. Today, Zyliss is operated by DKB Household Switzerland AG, the household utensil subsidiary of DKSH. This subsidiary currently has 120 employees and in addition to Zyliss they also operate the brand Cole & Mason (salt & pepper grinders and herb and spice tools) and the appliance brands Koenig and Turmix.

== Inventions ==
Three notable inventions have been developed by Zyliss including the "Susi" garlic press, the salad spinner, and an onion chopper. The Susi garlic press has an accompanying tool cleaner, and has been produced since the mid-20th century. The company also began creating the Zyliss vise (a home improvement tool) in the 1970s and has sold a slicing mandoline. The company has worked with IDEO on projects including the salad spinner, specifically on the aesthetic and visual components.

== See also ==
- KitchenAid
