= Product demonstration =

Sales and marketing technique

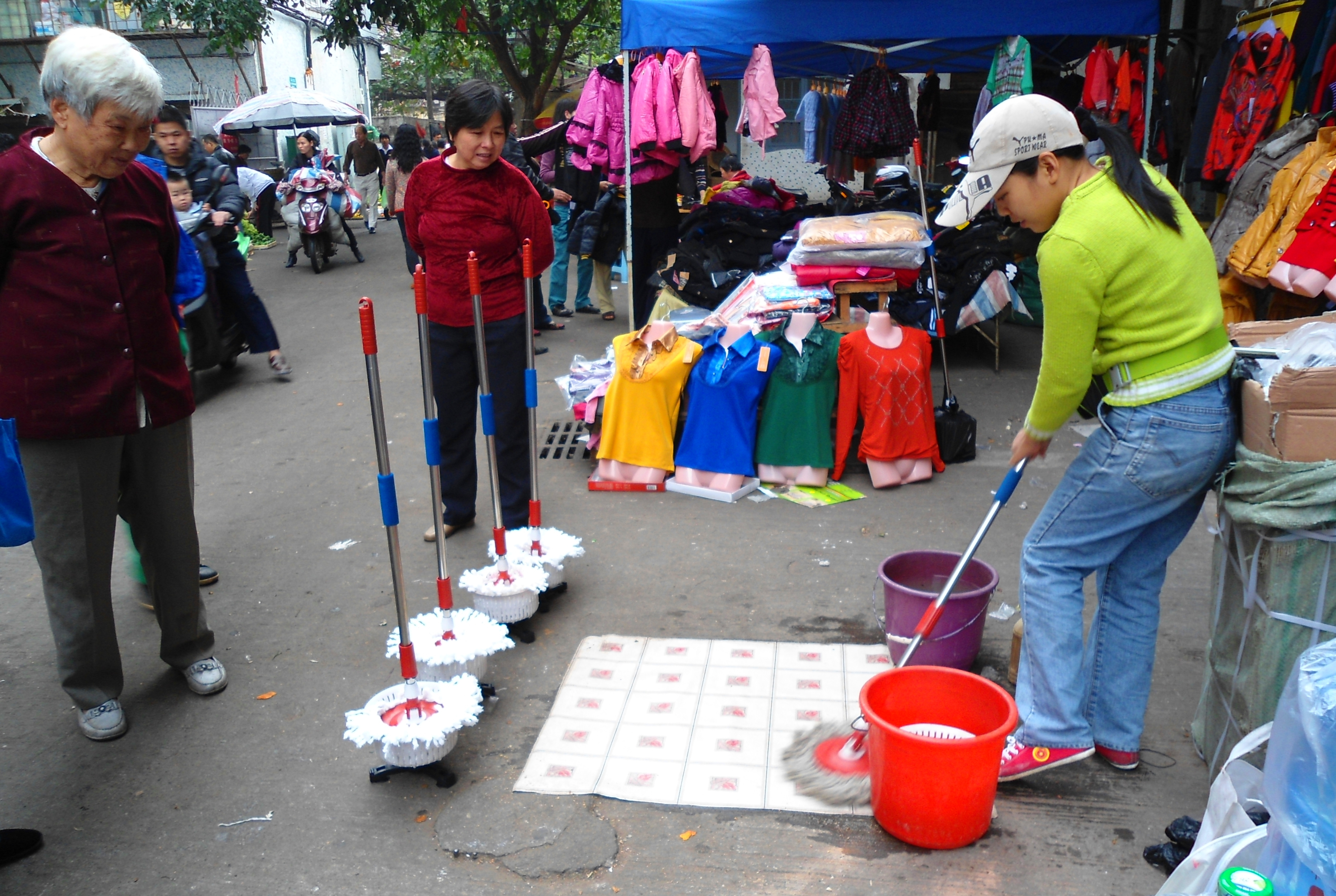
A market trader demonstrating a mop to potential customers

In marketing, a product demonstration (or "demo" for short) is a promotion where a product is demonstrated to potential customers. The goal is to introduce customers to the product in hopes of getting them to purchase that item.

Products offered as samples during these demonstrations may include new products, new versions of existing products or products that have been recently introduced to a new commercial marketplace.

Product demonstration enhances the quality of the sales presentation by providing a visual support. It is provided to be effective way to address the prospect 's specific product-related concerns.

== In-store ==
In-store demonstrations are usually performed at large retail locations, such as supermarkets, department or discount stores, or in shopping malls. The products that are promoted at in-store demonstrations may be food and beverages, food preparation equipment, housekeeping products, personal care items, or occasionally other types of goods. The samples that are distributed may either be in readymade packets pre-assembled for the demonstration, or are prepared on site by the demonstrator. Some demonstrations involve the distribution of prepared food, requiring the demonstrator to bring equipment such as a microwave oven or hot plate to the location.

Often, coupons for the product are distributed as part of the demonstration. Some demonstrations consist of coupon distribution only.

Demonstrators may be employees of the store where the demonstration is being performed, employees or the manufacturer of the product, or independent contractors who work for a temp agency. Most are not trained to seek out customers likely to buy the product.

=== Advantages ===
In-store demonstrations allow potential customers to touch or taste a product before they buy.

=== History ===
By the mid-1950s Ron Popeil states that "I was working in the Woolworth's store in Chicago selling the Chop-O-Matic, standing eight or 10 hours a day. I would do six demonstrations an hour. My vocal cords were so strained that I wouldn't want to talk to anybody when the day was over." The concept of the in-store demonstration started to boom in the 1980s.

== Home ==
Door-to-door, and by-appointment salespeople demonstrate such products as Tupperware, encyclopedias, vacuums, and carpet stain removers.

== Trade show ==
Prototypes are often demonstrated in trade shows, and are called "tech demos".

== Fairs ==
Product demonstrations have been a staple of state fairs for many years.

== Television ==
The first product demonstration in a format that would later be called an infomercial is attributed to a 1949 demonstration of the Vitamix blender.

== Roadside ==
Many countries around the world do not place legal restrictions on outdoor product marketing and demonstrations. Salespeople set up temporary sites to demonstrate their wares in order to attract sales.

=== China ===
A wide variety of products are demonstrated roadside throughout the China. Such products include frying pans, induction cookers, rubber gloves, vegetable peelers and slicers, stain removers, and knives.

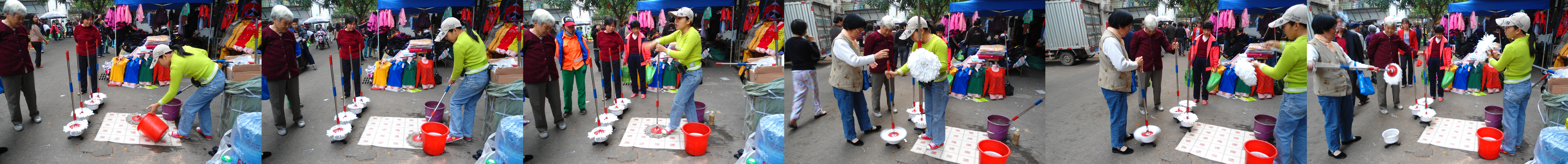
The salesperson shows how the mop cleans, and how the head can be removed by standing on it. She then demonstrates how it can be spun, ejecting water out of the mop. A prospective customer then spins a dry mop, and finally inspects the head.

=== United States ===
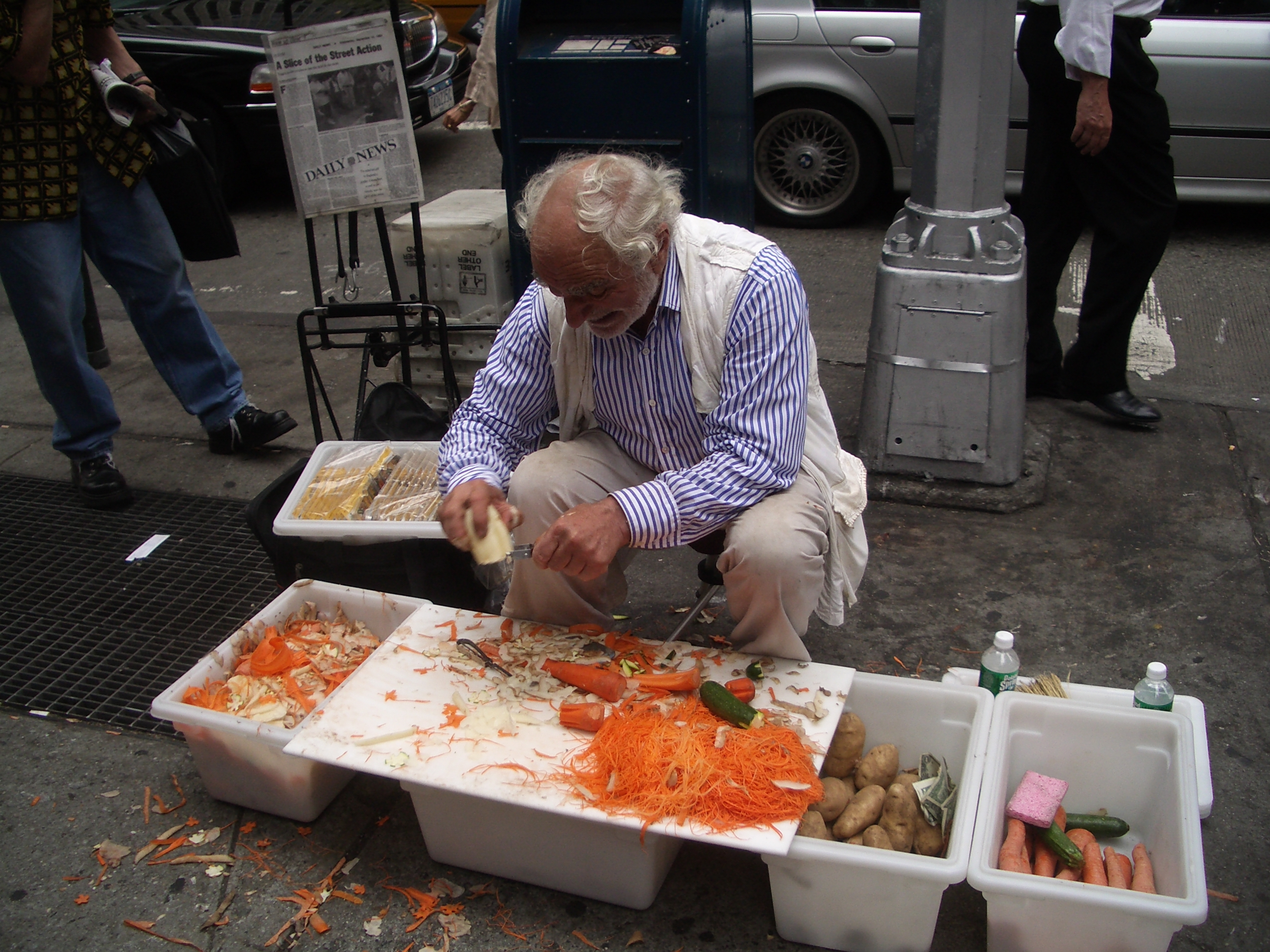
Joe Ades in Union Square, New York City, Aug 8, 2005

Though uncommon today, the street demonstration was ubiquitous in such places as the Boardwalk in Atlantic City.

== Video ==
Included with a purchase, a video on a DVD disc may be provided demonstrating the product's use.

Video product demonstrations can also be found on the Internet at the homepages of companies or on web hosting sites such as YouTube. One notable example is the viral video Will It Blend? demonstrating Blendtec blenders.

=== Music equipment ===
Product demonstration videos have become increasingly important for the sale of music equipment. With the increase of online shopping, there are fewer opportunities to try a product prior to purchase. This has a particular problem for music equipment which, unlike other technology, the quality of the sound produced may come down to a more personal preference and may not be as closely related to the specifications of a particular product.

YouTube is one of the main hosts of music equipment videos, and channels may be run by retailers, publishers, musicians or even manufacturers themselves.

== See also ==
- Freebie marketing
- Hawker (trade)
- Minimum viable product
- Wine tasting
