= Patter =

Practiced speech, often rapid

Patter is a prepared and practiced speech that is designed to produce a desired response from its audience. Examples of occupations with a patter include the auctioneer, salesperson, dance caller, magician, and comedian.

The term may have been a colloquial shortening of "Pater Noster", or the Lord's Prayer, and may have referred to the practice of mouthing or mumbling prayers quickly and mechanically.

From this, it became a slang word for the secret and equally incomprehensible mutterings of a cant language used by beggars, thieves, fences, etc., and then the fluent plausible talk that a cheap-jack employs to pass off his goods. Many illusionists, e.g., card magicians, use patter both to enhance the show and to distract the attention of the spectators.

In some circumstances, the talk becomes a different sense of "patter": to make a series of rapid strokes or pats, as of raindrops. Here, it is a form of onomatopoeia.

In hypnotherapy, the hypnotist uses a 'patter' or script to deliver positive suggestions for change to the client.

In London Labour and the London Poor (1851), Henry Mayhew divides the street-sellers of his time into two groups: the patterers, and everyone else.

== Entertainment and music ==
In certain forms of entertainment, peep shows and Russian rayok, patter is an important component of a show. The radio DJ patter, known as MCing, is among the roots of rapping. The form can be traced back as early as the 1890s among the other popular music styles like 'story ballads' and 'parlor waltzes.' Patter also has operatic origins as well, the form of the patter song being featured in the operettas of Gilbert and Sullivan. So important is patter to the Gilbert and Sullivan operetta form that it forms one of the seven identified tenants of their style. Patter then became a signature in the style known as Savoy opera. The musical identification of patter is intrinsically linked to the flow of words in time.

It is thus also used of any rapid manner of talking, and of a patter-song, in which a very large number of words have to be sung at high speed to fit the music. A western square dance caller may interpolate patter—in the form of metrical lines, often of nonsense—to fill in between commands to the dancers.

== See also ==
- Joe Ades, a well-known seller of peelers in New York
