= Mouli grater =

Kitchen utensil

A Mouli grater or rotational grater is a hand-operated kitchen utensil designed for grating or pureeing small quantities of food. The device consists of a small metal drum with holes that grate the food and a handle for turning the drum.

The hand-held unit consists of two sections with hinged handles. The end of one handle contains a food hopper with a grating cylinder and a crank for rotating the cylinder. The other section has a rounded surface that acts as a clamp, pressing the food to be grated into the grating cylinder. The hinged handles are held in one hand and squeezed so that the food presses against the grating cylinder. Meanwhile, the other hand turns the crank, causing the cylinder to rotate and the food to be grated. Because the cylinder can be removed, the Mouli grater can be easily used by both left- and right-handed people by simply placing the grater with the crank on the preferred side.

The rotational grater was first patented in France in the 1940s. Mouli is a French brand name that became Moulinex in 1957, partly in response to the success of the electric coffee grinder of the same name. A grating cylinder similar to the one used in this design later turned up in food processors from that company.

There are three cylinders: a fine grater, medium grater, and a slice-producing cutter.

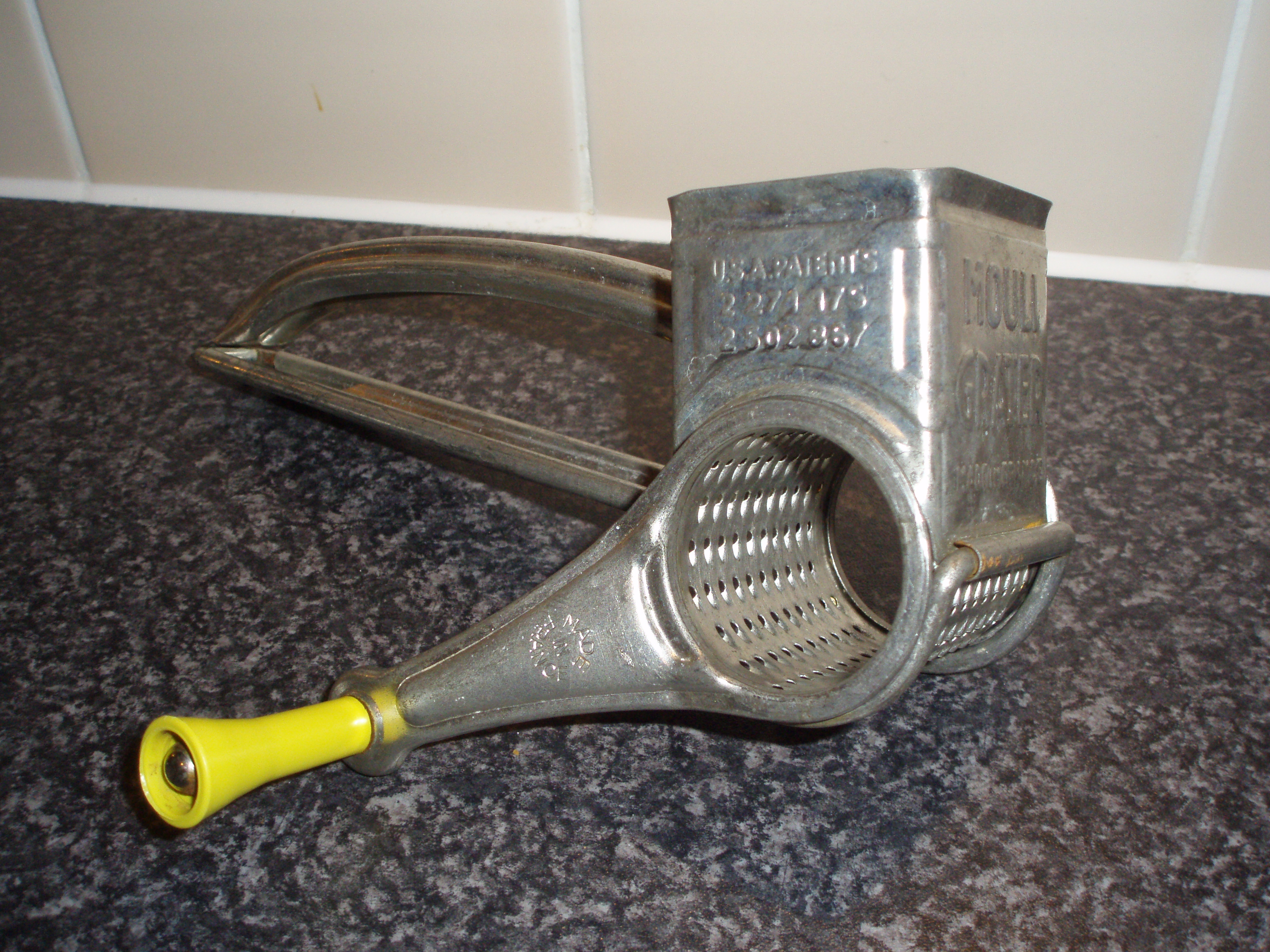
Side view

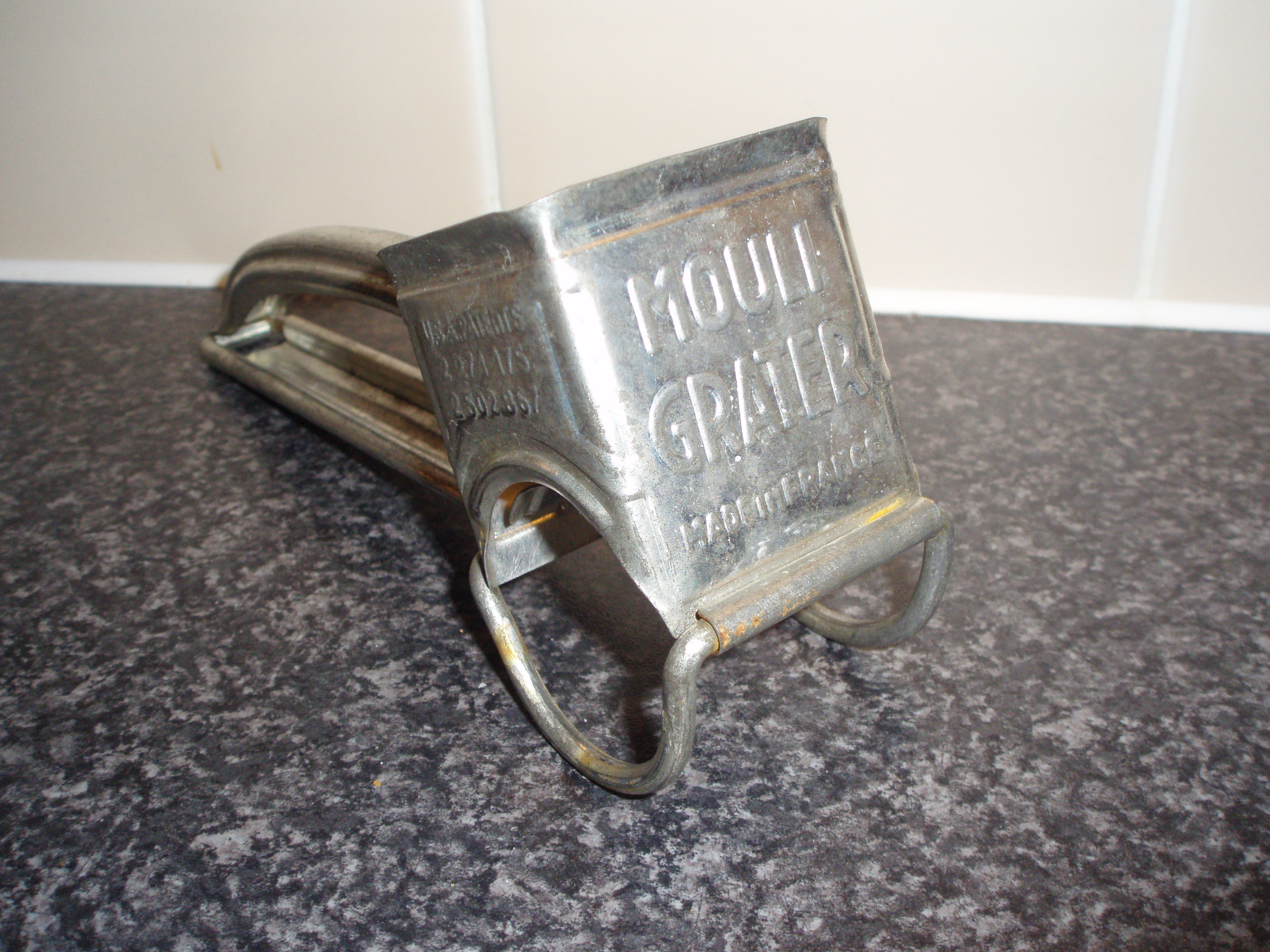
Front of a Mouli grater

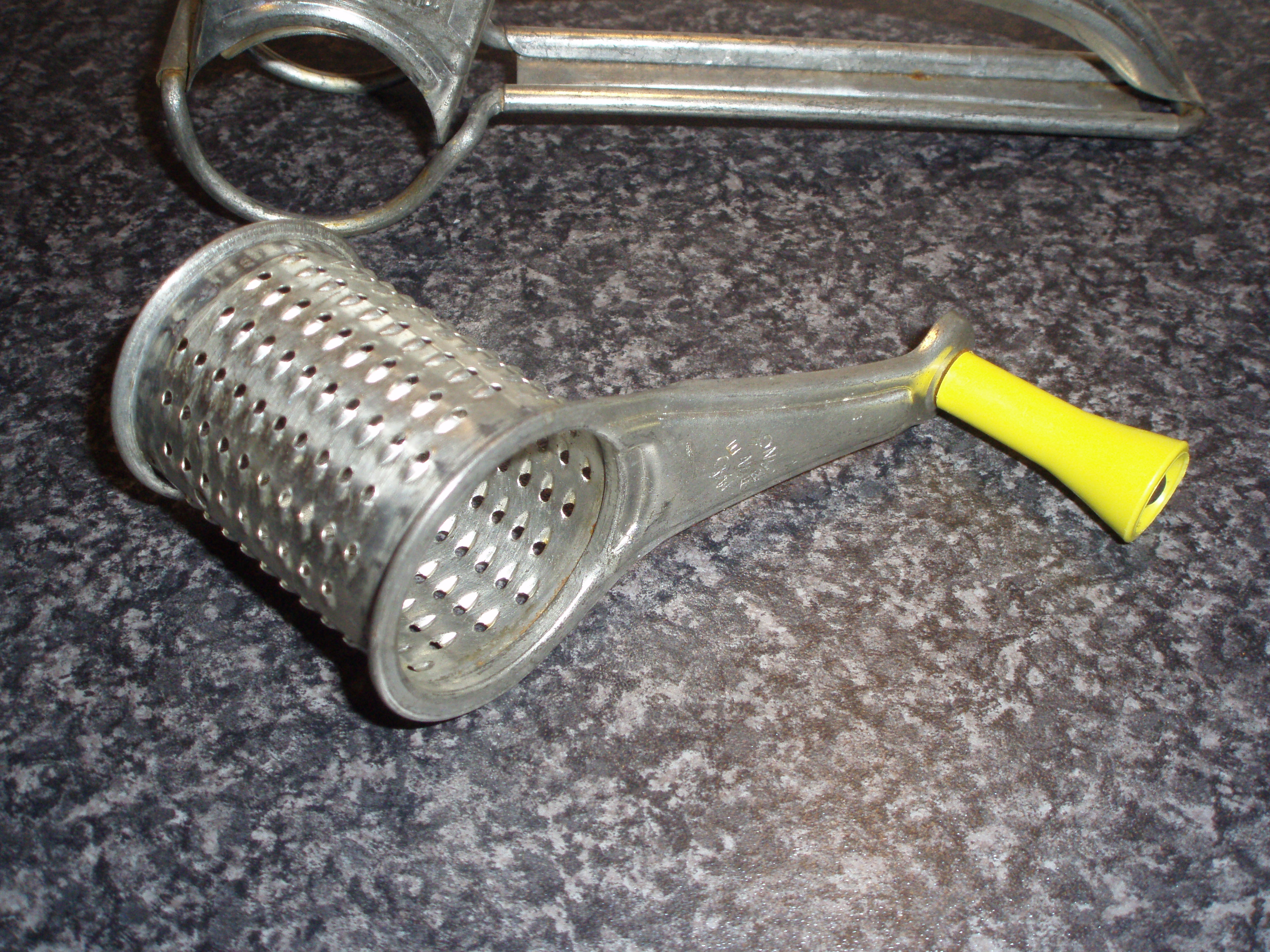
Grating barrel with a yellow handle

== See also ==
- Food mill
