= Peeler =

Tool to remove the outer skin or peel

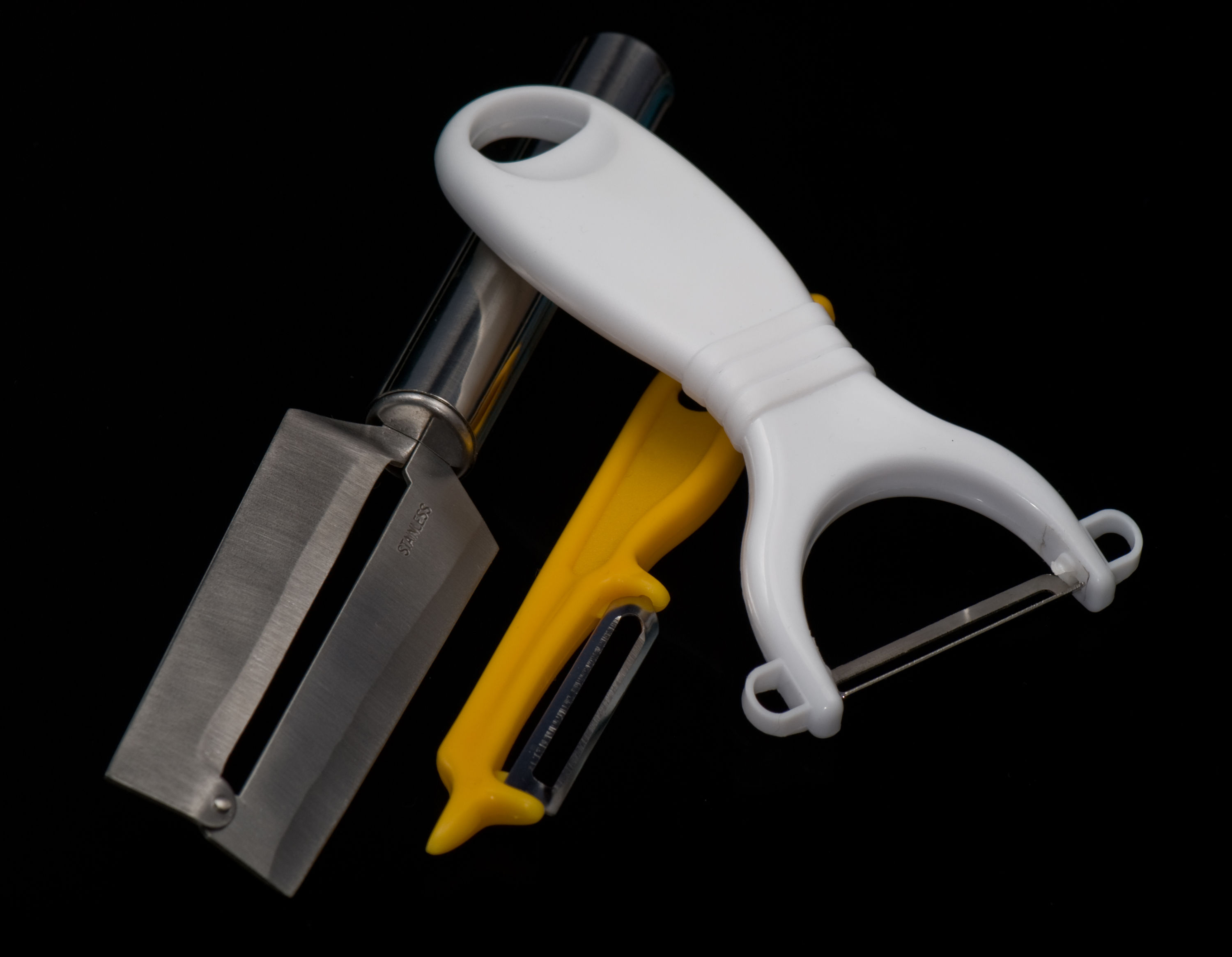
A fixed blade (aka sugarcane peeler knife), Australian and Y peeler

Using a peeler

A peeler (vegetable scraper) is a kitchen tool, a distinct type of kitchen knife, consisting of a metal blade with a slot with a sharp edge attached to a handle, used to remove the outer layer (the "skin" or "peel") of some vegetables such as potatoes, broccoli stalks, and carrots, and fruits such as apples and pears. A paring knife may also be used to peel vegetables. The blade of a peeler has a slot with one side sharpened; the other side of the slot prevents the blade from cutting too far into the vegetable.

== Overview ==
There are numerous designs of peelers used today. Most handheld peelers are either straight or Y-type, while the particular designs vary depending on region and personal preference.

== Straight peelers ==
A straight peeler has the blade parallel to the handle, resembling a knife. The blade may be fixed or pivoting. The Lancashire and French Econome designs contain a fixed blade which does not pivot. The Lancashire often has a round wooden handle wrapped in string, and is often single edged, though there are dual edged variants. The Econome, invented in 1928 by Victor Pouzet, entails a unique blade design that features two slits.

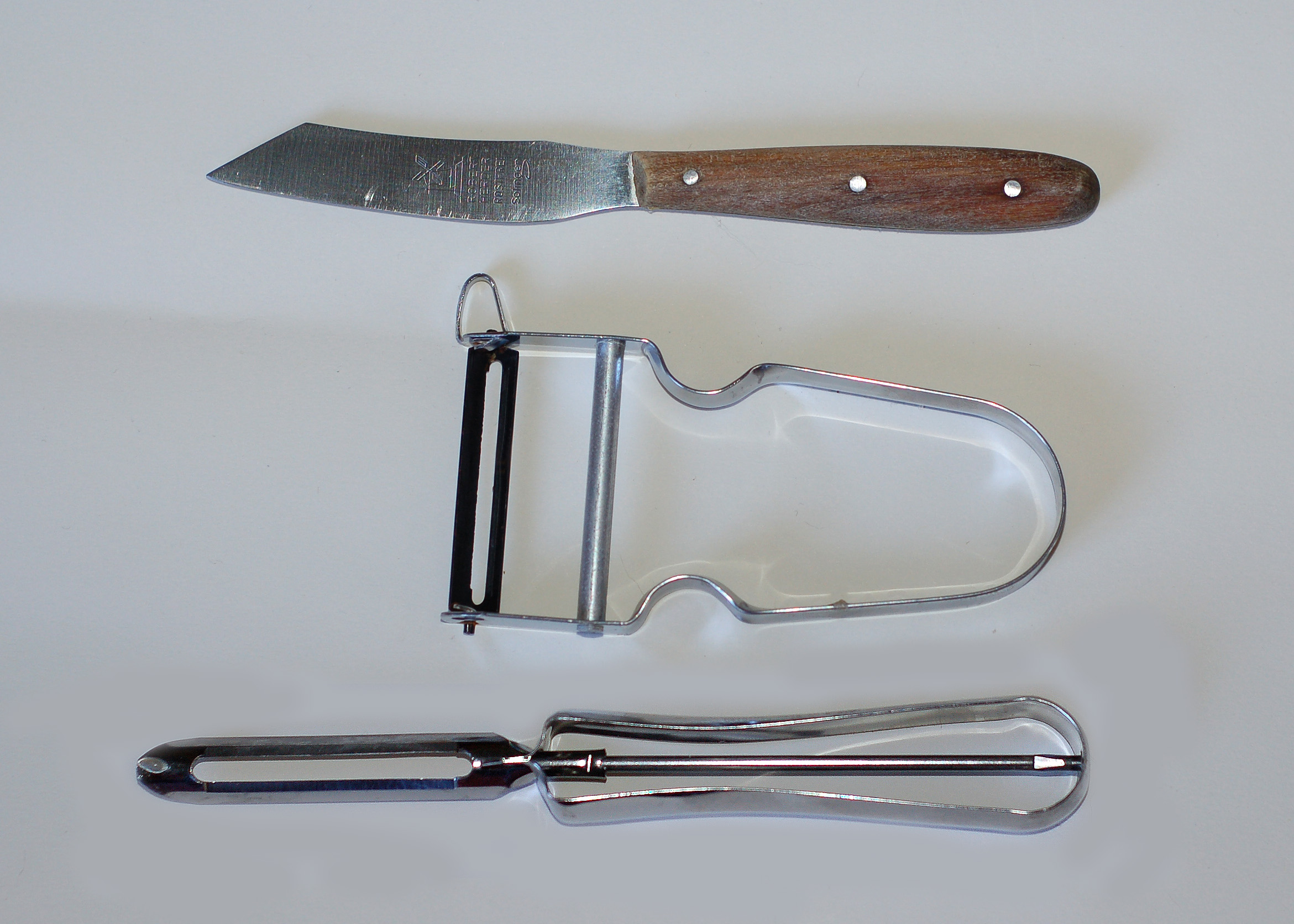
From top to bottom, a paring knife, a Zena Rex Y-type peeler and a swivel (Jonas) peeler

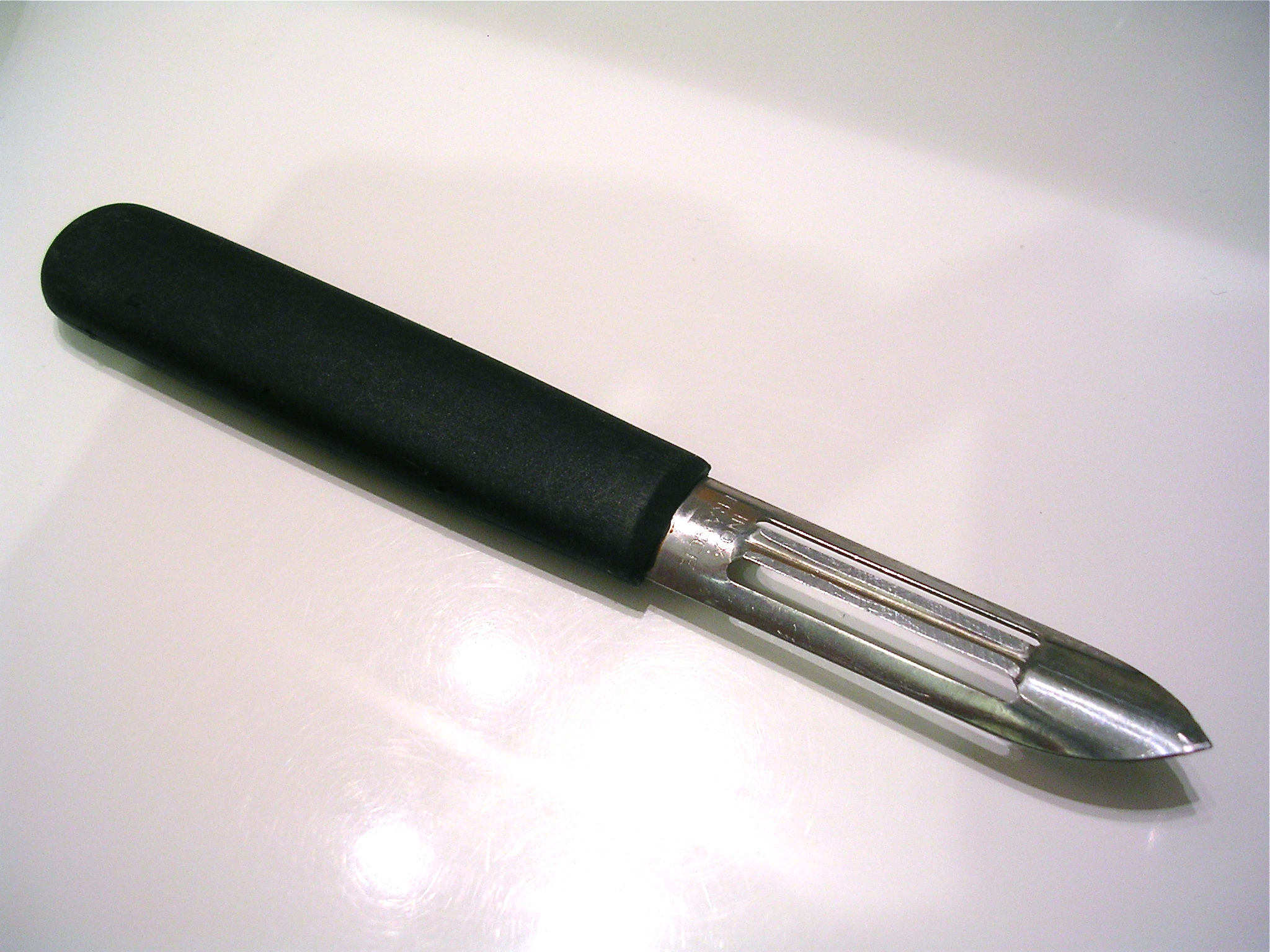
A French Econome straight peeler

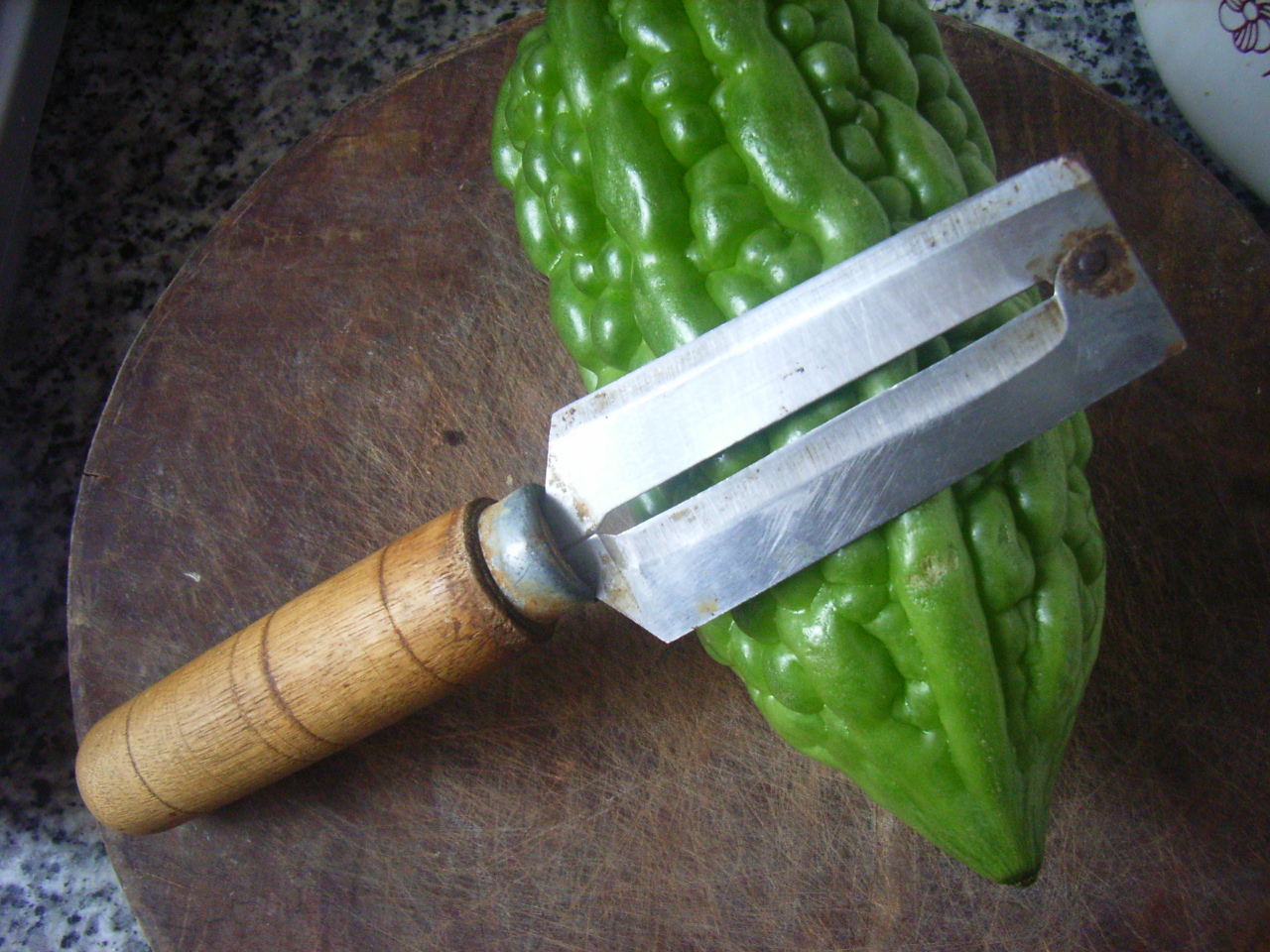
A fixed blade straight peeler aka sugarcane/pineapple peeler common in Asia

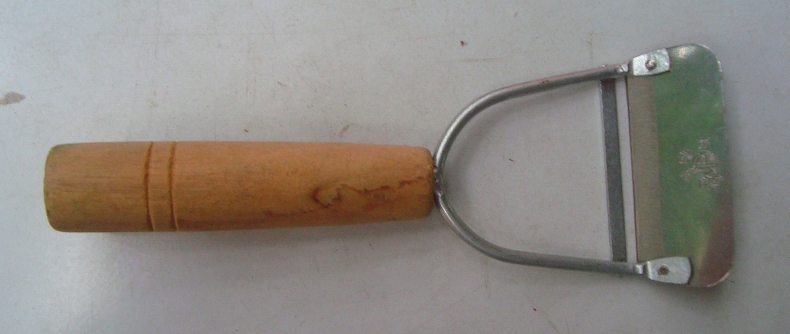
A fixed blade Y peeler, common in China

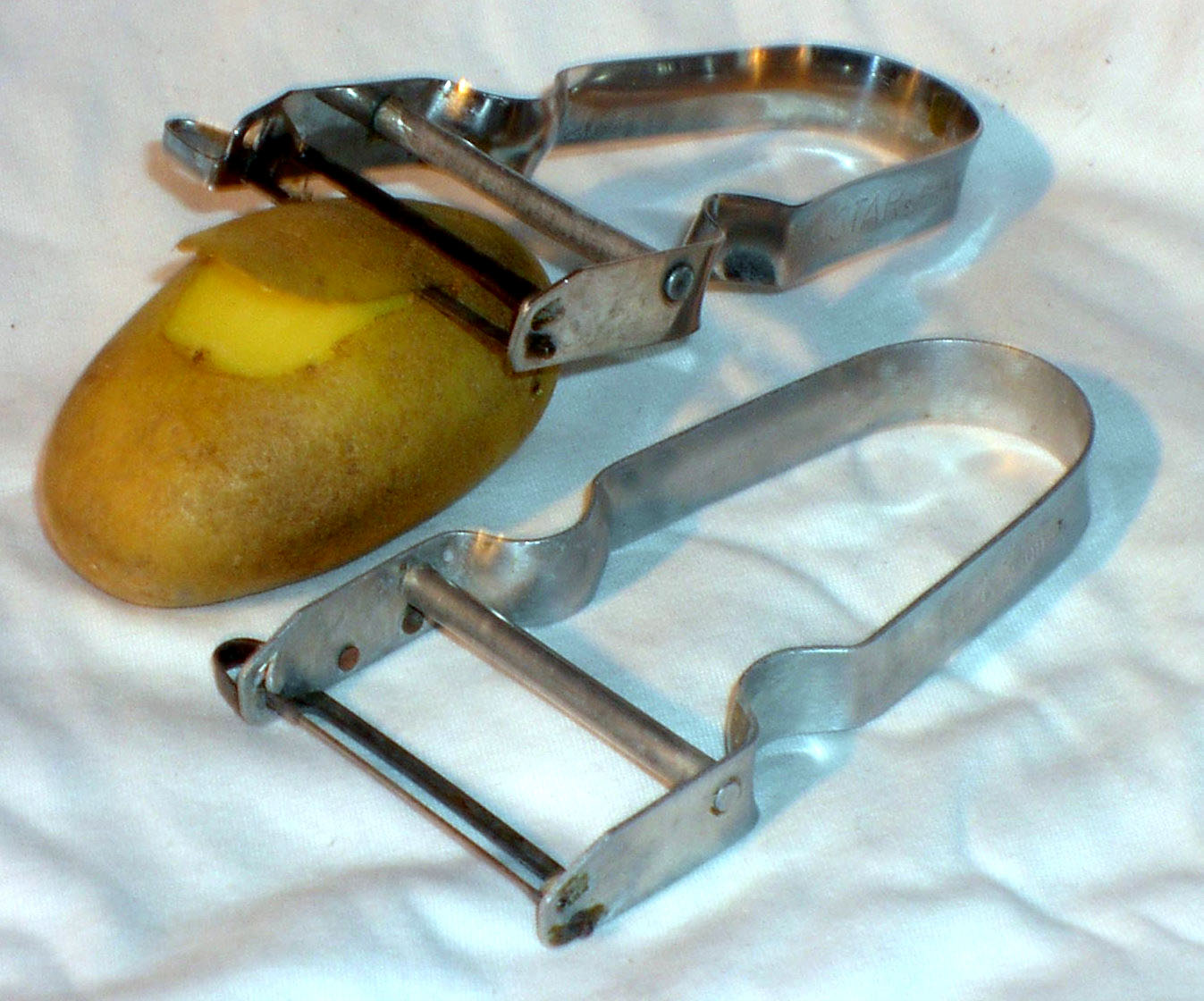
Zena Star (top) and Rex (bottom) peelers

=== Swivel peelers ===
Swivel peelers have the blade mounted on a pivot; the angle of the blade self-adjusts as pressure is applied, increasing ease of use.

The Jonas peeler, designed in Sweden in 1953, is a straight design with a pivoting blade attached to the end of an oblong metal loop handle, which is held like a knife. A shaft runs through the length of the handle. The blade has two edges to enable use in either direction, and by either hand. While often copied, the original is still made by Linden Sweden. For many decades, it has been the standard type of peeler in the United States.

== Y peelers ==
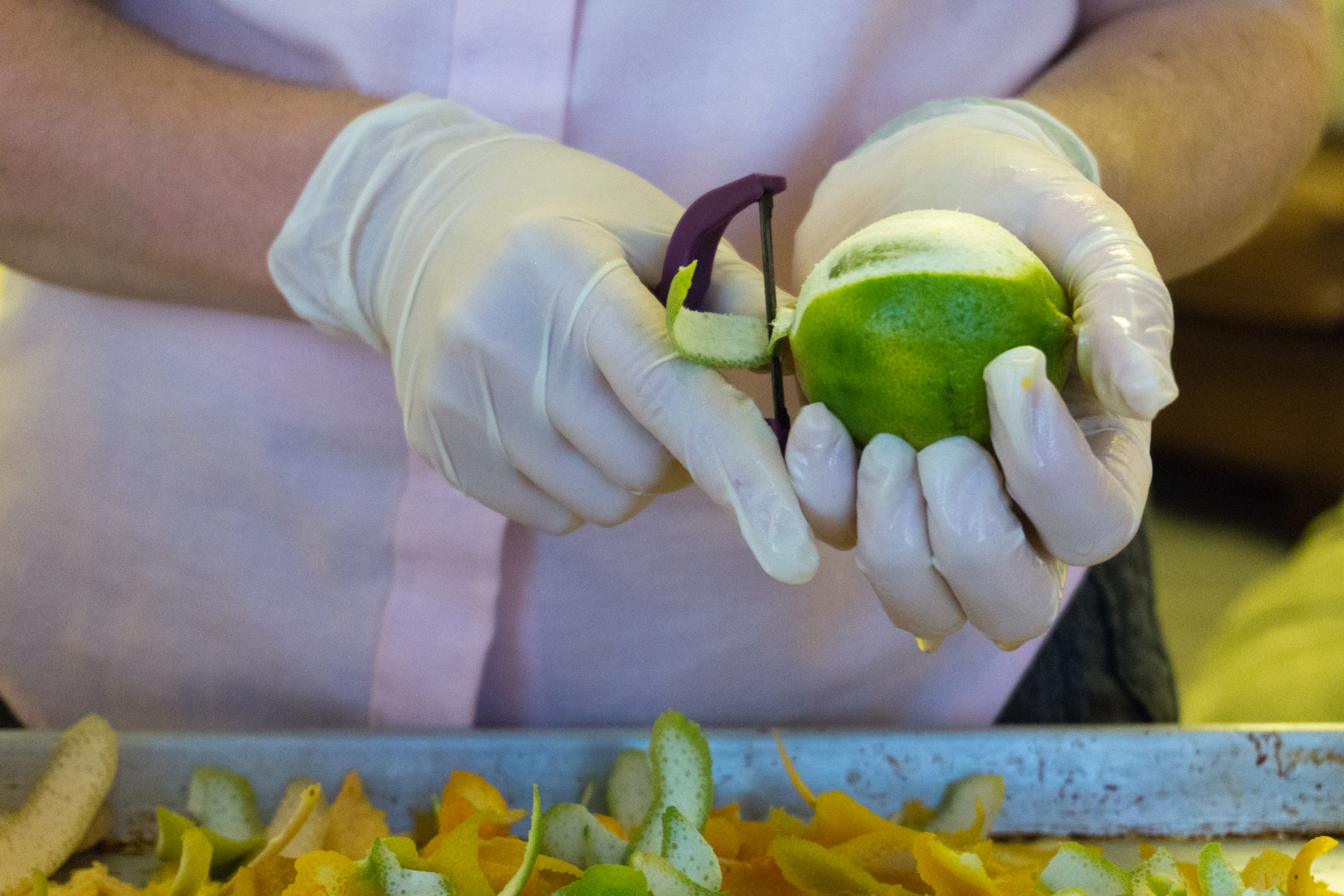
A chef uses a Y peeler to peel a lime.

A Y peeler or speed peeler has a blade perpendicular to its handle, a design closely resembling a safety razor. It is used with a similar action to a razor, shaving off skin in strips parallel to the handle. Most speed peelers have an 'eye gouger' beside the blade, a loop of metal used to dig out eyes and blemishes from a potato.

A particularly famous example of this variety is the Zena Rex peeler, invented in 1947 by Alfred Neweczerzal of Davos, Switzerland. Considered an icon of Swiss design, it was featured on a 2004 Swiss postage stamp. It has a one piece aluminum handle and a pivoting carbon steel blade with dual edges. The stainless steel handled variant, the Zena Star peeler, was the model popularized by legendary New York City street hawker Joe Ades.

== Other types ==
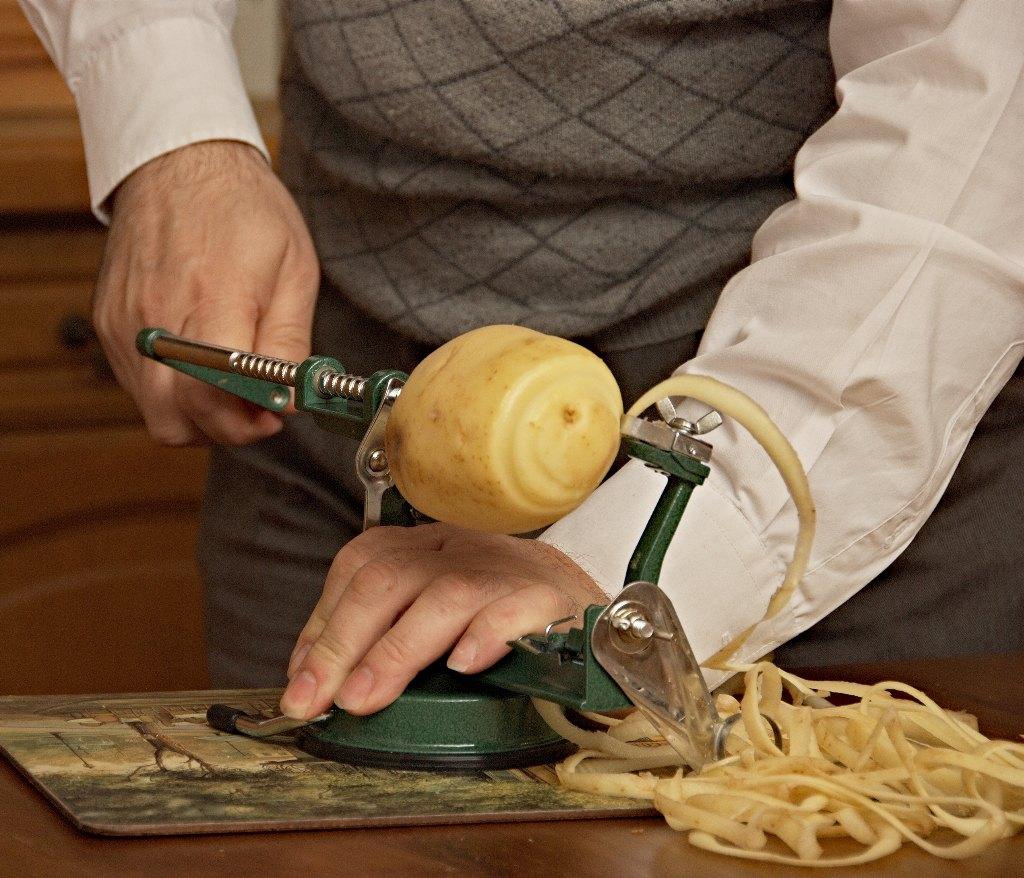
A potato being peeled with a mechanical apple peeler

Most "Y" and inline pivoting peelers have a straight blade. A few have a curved blade which is a closer fit to the contour of a potato or other item being peeled; it takes a wider bite, requiring fewer passes to complete peeling.

A mechanical apple peeler is a crank operated device that peels apples and optionally cores and slices them in one motion. When the slicer is enabled it cuts a normal apple into a helical shape. It is designed to work on apples but will also peel a number of other fruits and vegetables such as pears, beetroot, potatoes, cucumbers and thick carrots.

Several variations of this type of crank peeler have appeared in modern times, such as The CrankMaster Peeler, which claims to help those with arthritis be able to peel various fruits like apples and pears.

== Industrial peelers ==
In an industrial setting, potatoes may be peeled using steam jets to loosen the surface skin, followed by a dry abrasion. The process may also involve treatment with lye to soften the outer skin. One type of mechanical peeler, the Magnascrubber, tumbles the potatoes on rollers with rubber studs, which removes the skin. Similar tumbling units with variously sized disc-shaped studs are used for peaches, tomatoes, beets and carrots.

== See also ==
- Garlic peeler
- Spiral vegetable slicer
