= Moulinex =

French home appliance brand

- Company type: Subsidiary
- Industry: Consumer products
- Founded: 1937
- Founder: Jean Mantelet
- Headquarters: France
- Parent: Groupe SEB
- Website: https://www.moulinex.com

Moulinex is a Groupe SEB brand along with Rowenta, Calor, All-Clad, Lagostina, Krups, and Tefal, all household products brands. The company designed and produced the Mouli grater. The company was founded by Jean Mantelet who in 1932 invented the Moulin-Légumes, a hand-crank food mill for puréeing vegetables. The design is considered an early forerunner to the modern food processor.

Mantelet's business plan was to "choose an industrial sector with a future, use mass production, keep prices low, manufacture in regions where salaries are low, reduce costs, reduce dependencies on suppliers, and focus on research and publicity". Between 1929 and 1953 Mantelet applied for 93 patents.

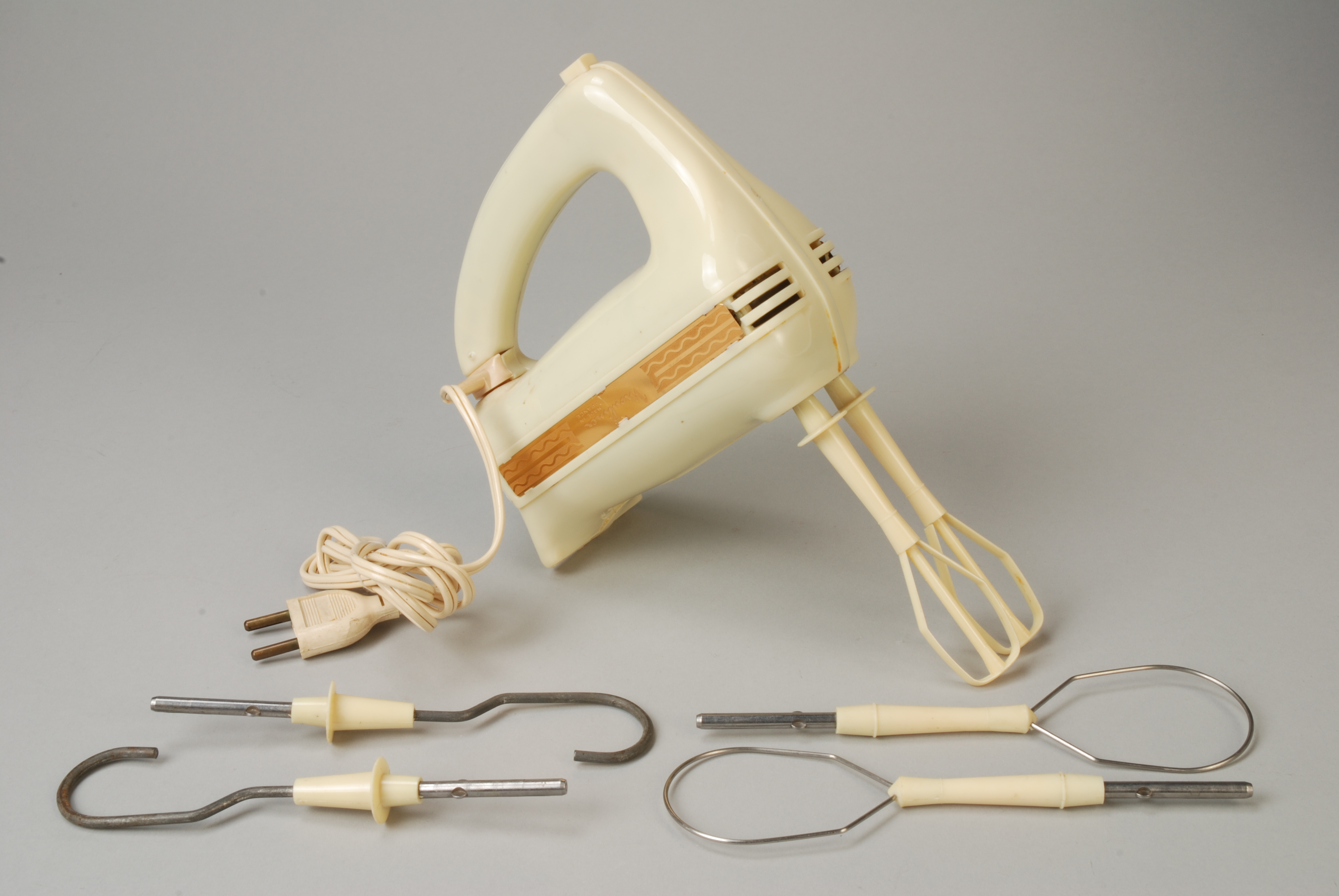
Moulinex mixer (1955)

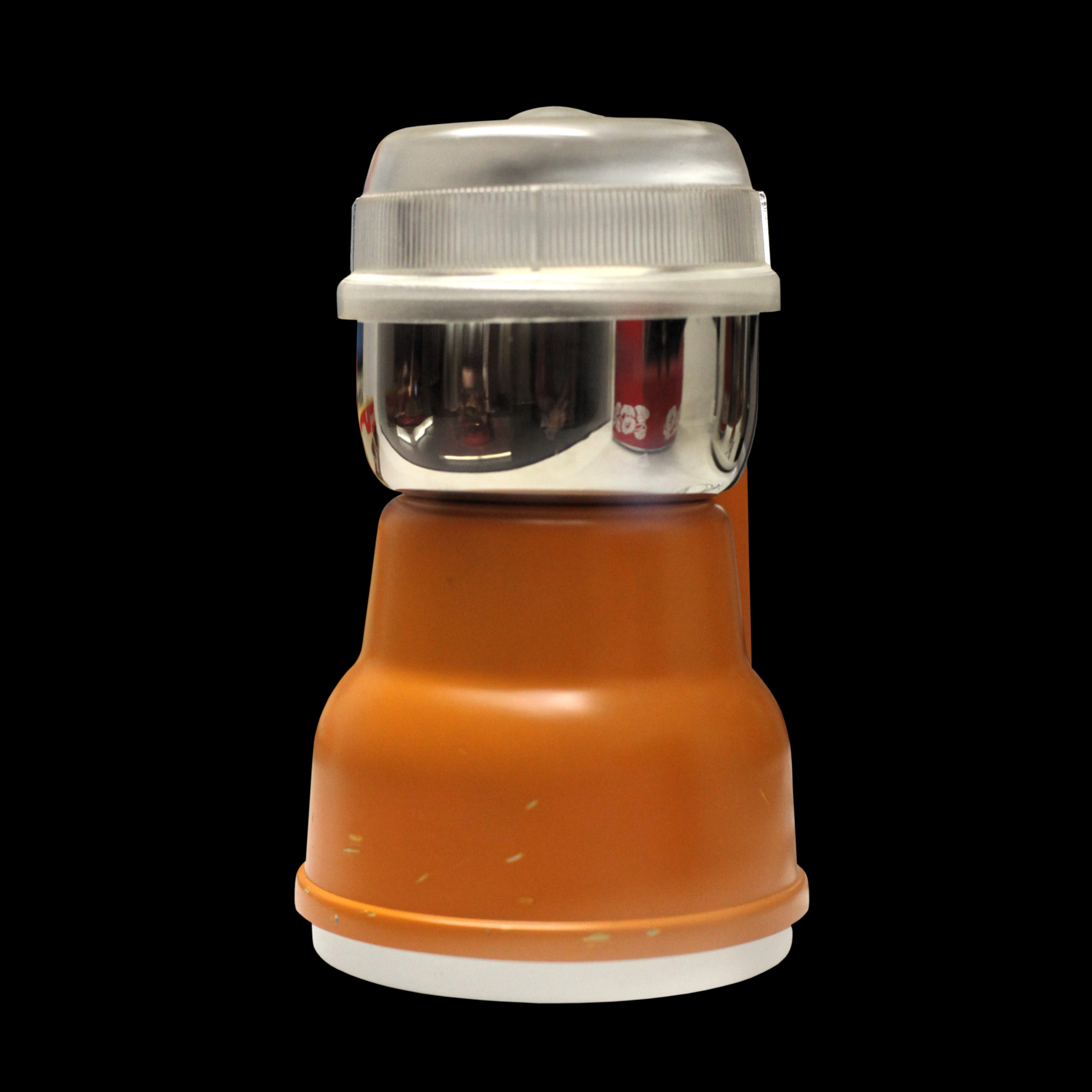
Ario Relift coffee grinder (1968)

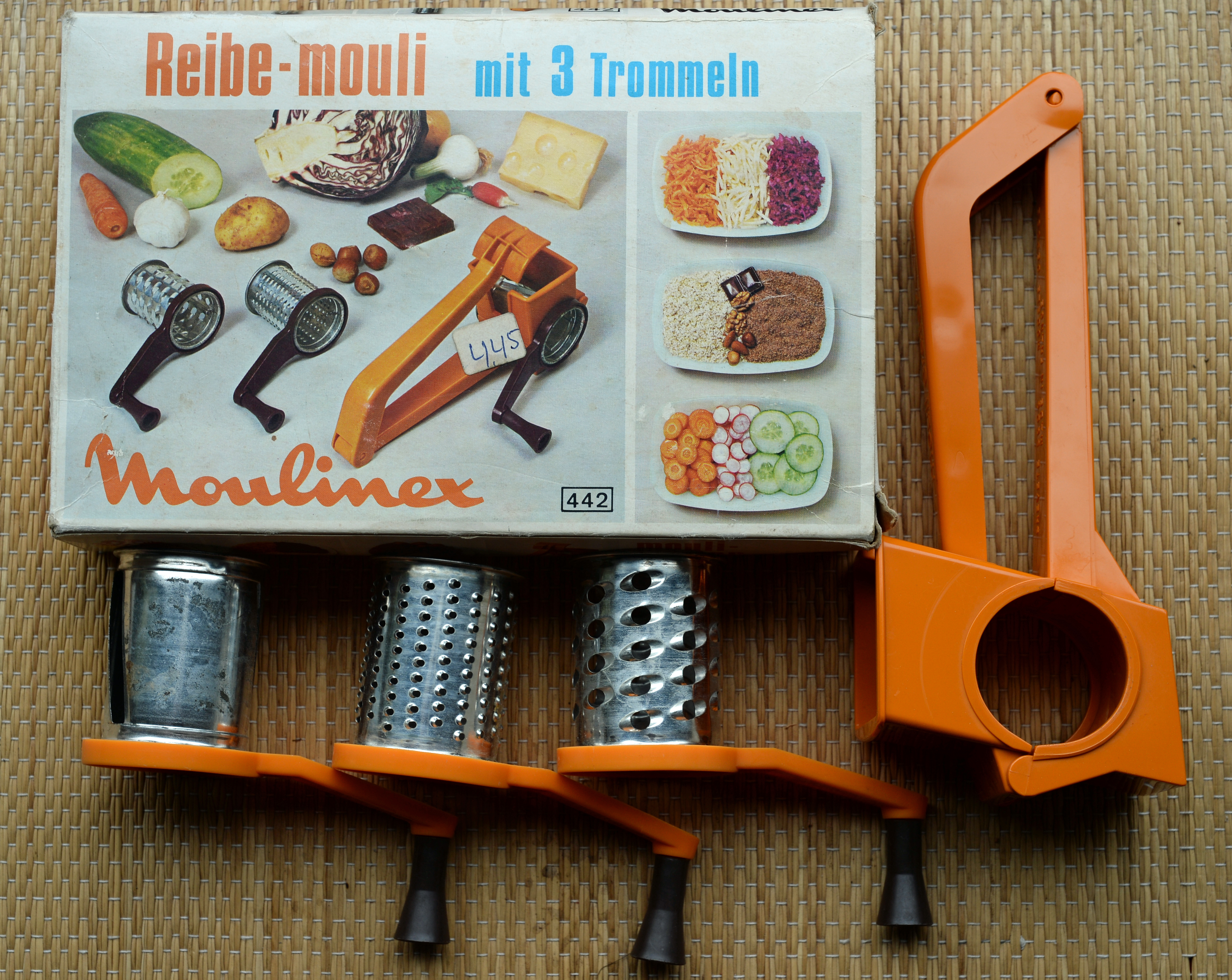
Multi Mouli-Grater 442 with 3 drums (1970s)

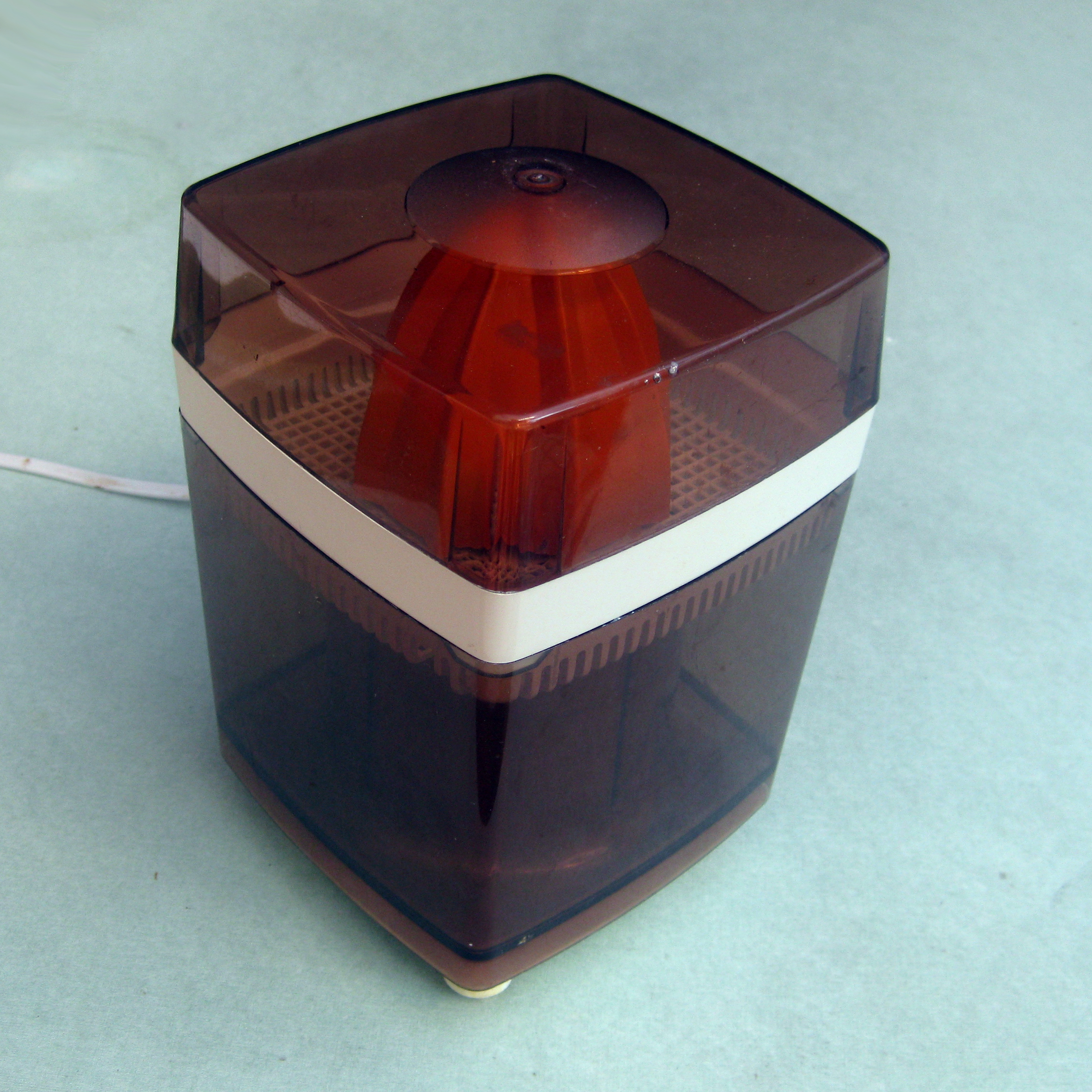
PA1A juice squeezer

== History ==
- 1931: Jean Mantelet, proprietor of a small metal working plant in Bagnolet, specialised in the fabrication of home appliances, wins a major prize for his invention of the Moulinette presse-purée.
- 1932: On the 6th of February he applies for a patent number 732.100 and begins to market his "Moulin-Légumes". From 1933 to 1935 he sells two million units.
- 1937: the Bagnolet plant is at full capacity, and a new plant is established at Alençon under the name Moulin-Legumes. Employees: 40.
- 1951: after the war the company expands its line of hand-operated tools to include nutcrackers, pepper grinders, and other devices and production is at 30,000 units per day. The following year more than 100 million units are sold.
- 1953: the Velosolex gives Mantelet the idea to motorise his appliances. He creates the first affordable electric coffee grinder, the Moulinex, which gives the final name to the enterprise. Introduction of the Légumex salad spinner.
- 1957: Moulin-Légumes is renamed Moulinex.
- 1961: Moulinex uses the slogans "Moulinex libère la femme" (Moulinex, liberator of women), et "Vive la cuisine presse-bouton !" (Long live the push-button kitchen!) and in America "It's so simple when you Moulinex it".
- 1969: Moulinex is listed on the French stock exchange.
- 1977: TV commercials begin airing in the United States for an electrical food processor Moulinex dubs "LaMachine."
- 1985: faced with foreign competition, posts its first-ever net loss. The company edges towards bankruptcy and is only saved by personal investment from Jean Mantelet.
- 1986: 1600 employees are laid off. Staff is now at 8,500 salaried employees. Mantelet suffers a stroke and the following year hands the company's reins over to three of his top managers: Gilbert Torelli, in charge of sales; Roland Darneau, in charge of production; and Michel Vannoorenberghe, in charge of finance.
- 1988: Jean Mantelet, aged 88, implements a succession plan for an employee buyout with help from his main banker Crédit Lyonnais. Michel Vannorenberghe, Gilbert Torelli, Roland Darneau, and Jacques Texier get 51% of voting rights with only 25,7 % the capital. The other employees get 30% ownership of Moulinex. The plan leads to an internal power struggle. Also this year, Moulinex acquires the UK based Bulpitt & Sons (Swan Brand) Ltd., a manufacturer of electrical kitchen appliances and holloware; this company was to be dissolved one year later while Moulinex was to retain the Swan brand for a while
- 1991: death of Jean Mantelet; acquisition of Krups at an enormous financial cost.
- 1994: Jules Coulon, formerly of Michelin is brought in to end the employee control and management with investment group Euris taking a 40% stake. Efforts are made to rationalise operations, including the areas of purchasing and marketing. Factories at Granville and Domfront are closed.
- 1995: losses top 700 million francs for the fiscal year.
- 1997: with a revised shareholder structure and an intensive restructuring program led by CEO Pierre Blayau, formerly of French retailing giant Pinault-Printemps-Redoute, and Moulinex announces its first net profit in five years.
- 2000: merger with El.Fi, the Italian company which owned the German Brandt household appliance brand.
- 2001: "Colossal" losses prompt a restructuring including a reduction of 4,000 staff and closure of factories in France, Brazil, and Thurles (Ireland), in an effort to return to profit. Later that year the company declares bankruptcy. Groupe SEB eventually takes over.
