= Garlic press =

Kitchen utensil, to crush garlic cloves

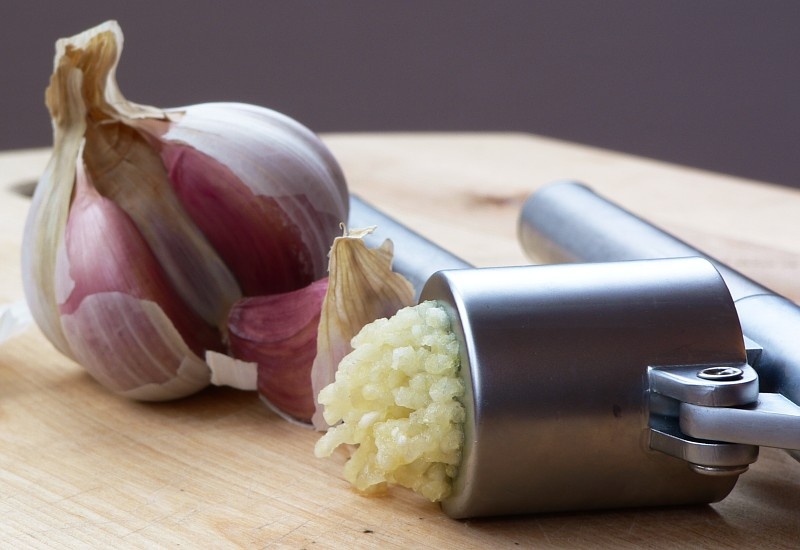
Garlic having been crushed using a garlic press

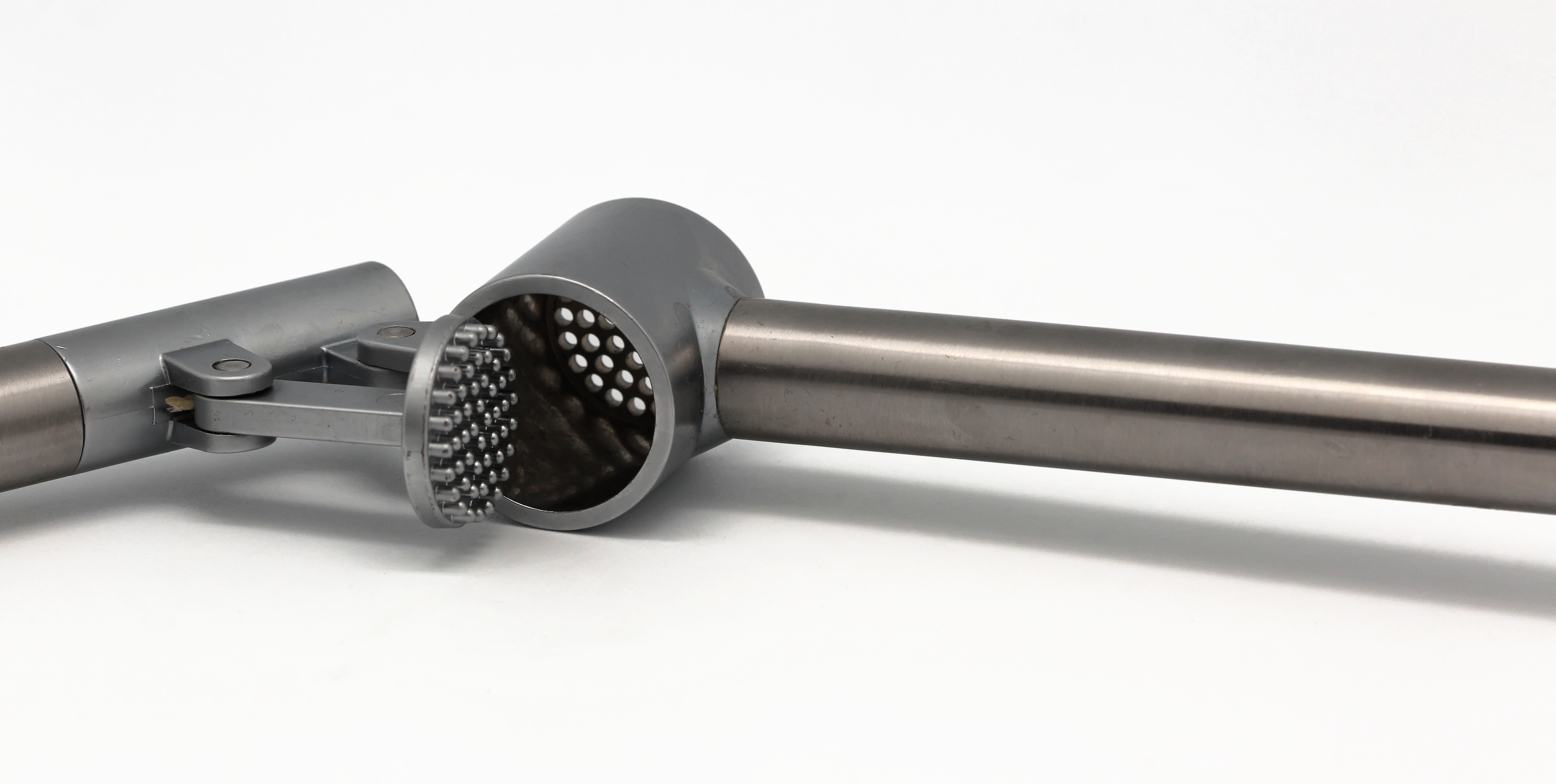
Many garlic presses also have a device with a matching grid of blunt pins to clean out the holes.

A garlic press, also known as a garlic crusher, is a kitchen utensil to crush garlic cloves efficiently by forcing them through a grid of small holes, usually with some type of piston. Many garlic presses also have a device with a matching grid of blunt pins to clean out the holes.

The first patent for a garlic press is credited to Karl Zysset (1907–1988) founder of the Swiss kitchen utensil company Zyliss, though the design is functionally identical to earlier presses that were in widespread use.

Garlic presses present a convenient alternative to mincing garlic with a knife, especially because a clove of garlic can be passed through a sturdy press without even removing its peel. The peel remains in the press while the garlic is extruded out. Some sources also claim that pressing with the peel on makes cleaning the press easier.

Garlic crushed by a press is generally believed to have a different flavor from minced garlic, because more of garlic's strong flavor compounds are liberated. A few sources prefer the flavor of pressed garlic. Raw-foods chef Renée Underkoffler says "a good garlic press makes dealing with garlic a clean pleasure. Pressed garlic has a lighter, more delicate flavor than minced garlic because it excludes the bitter center stem." The magazine Cook's Illustrated says "a good garlic press can break down cloves more finely and evenly than an average cook using a knife, which means better distribution of garlic flavor throughout any given dish."

On the other hand, some chefs say garlic crushed in a press has an inferior flavor compared to other forms of garlic. For instance, chef Anthony Bourdain called garlic presses "abominations" and advised "don't put it through a press. I don't know what that junk is that squeezes out of the end of those things, but it ain't garlic." The cookery writer Elizabeth David wrote an essay titled "Garlic Presses are Utterly Useless". Alton Brown (known for his dislike of single-purpose kitchen tools) has referred to garlic presses as "useless" and without a reason to exist.

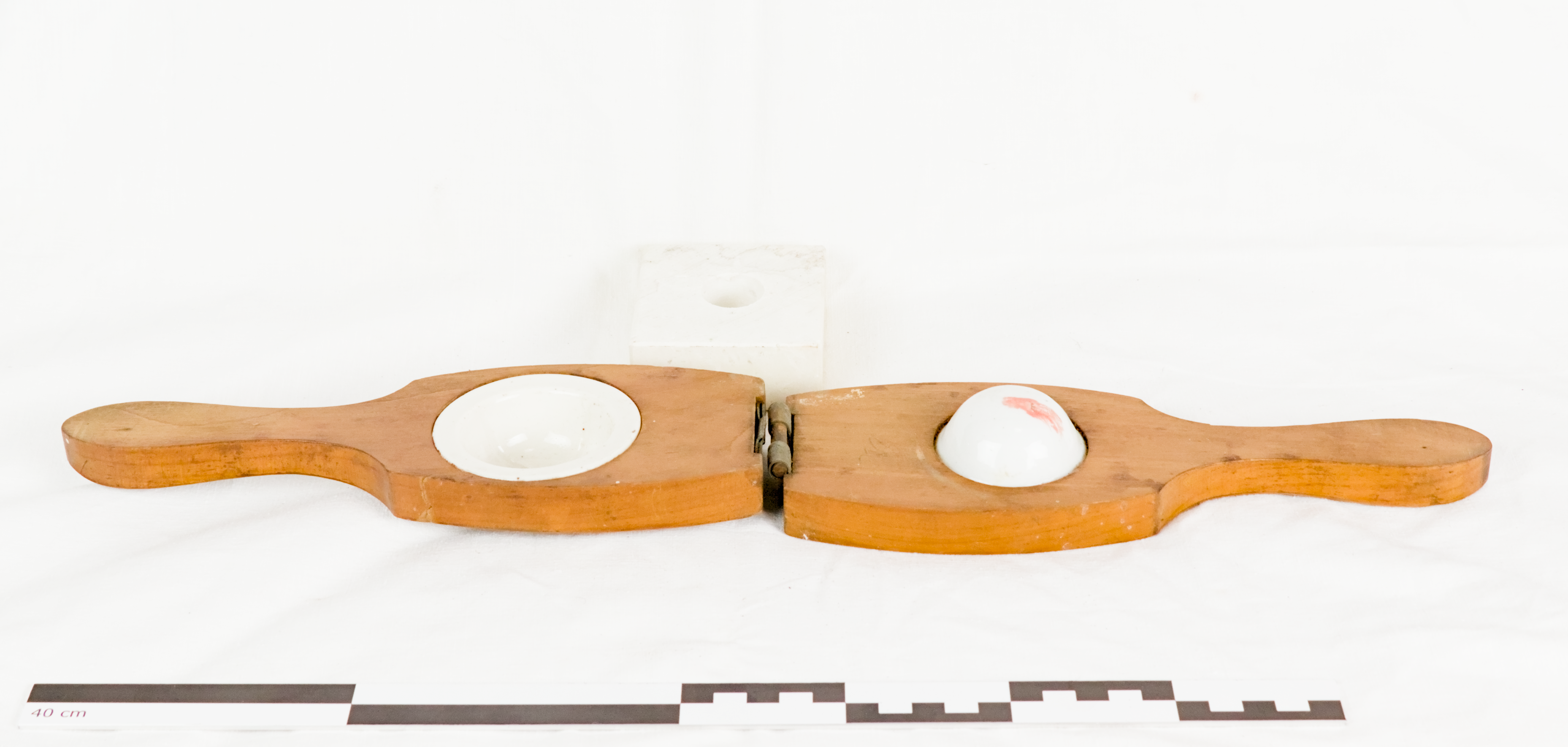
Old garlic press made of wood and ceramic.

Cook's Illustrated lists some additional uses for a garlic press, such as mashing other small items (including olives, capers, anchovies, ginger and canned chipotles) or pressing out small quantities of onion or shallot juice.

== Collection ==
The largest collection of unique garlic presses is thought to be owned by Tord Elfwendahl, Stockholm, who has since 1979 collected an excess of 1200 unique garlic presses.

== See also ==
- Garlic peeler
- Potato ricer
