= Garlic peeler =

Kitchen utensil

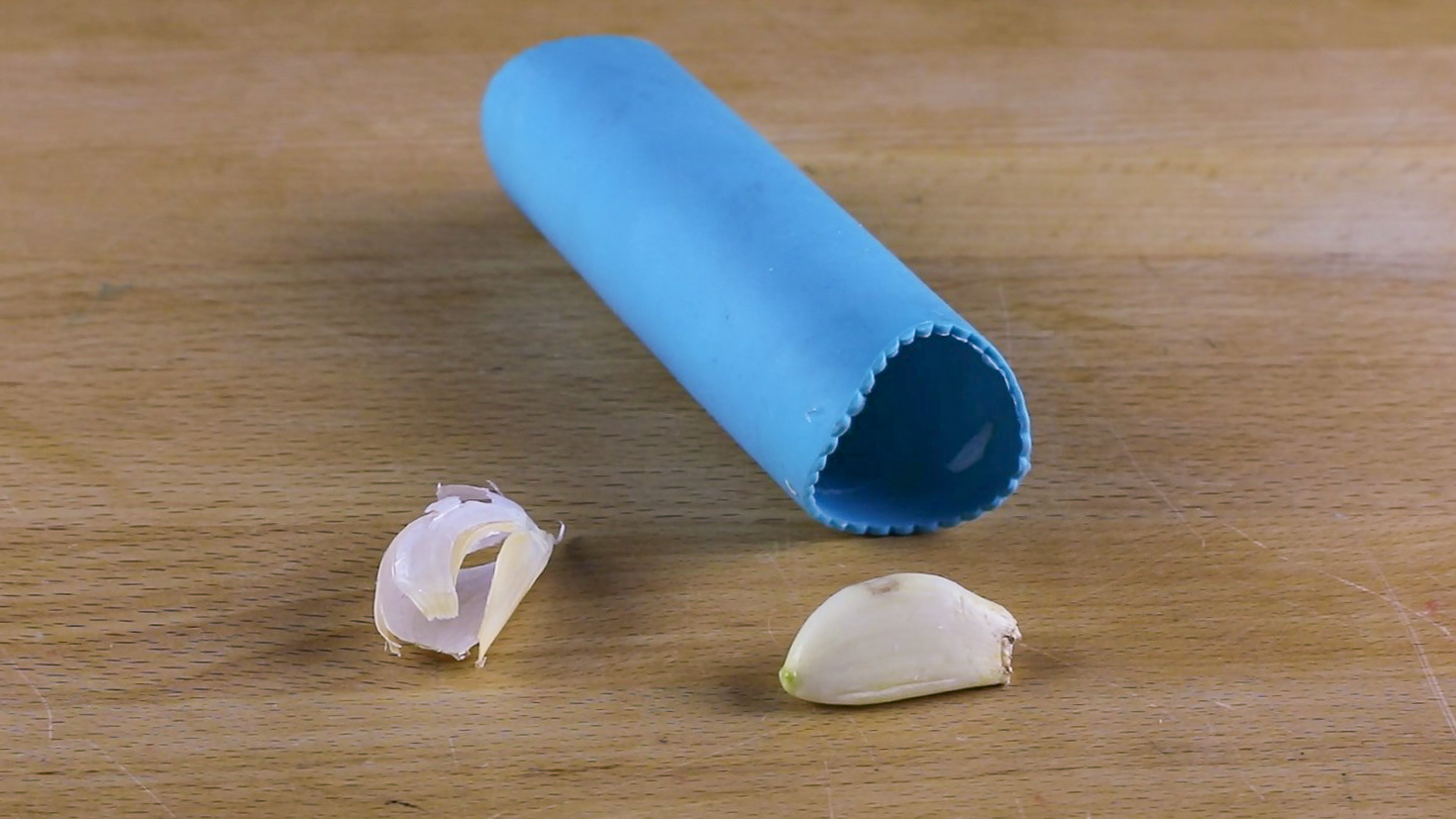
Silicon tube garlic peeler with peeled garlic clove

A garlic peeler is a kitchen utensil used to take off the skin off the garlic cloves.

A closed, hard-walled container, such as a jar or lidded tub or bowl, can be used to peel garlic. The bulb of garlic is smashed with the bottom of the container, and the cloves placed in the container and shaken to separate them from their skins.

Video of garlic peeler tube in action

One garlic-peeling device is a silicone or rubber tube. Using hands to apply a moderate pressure and to rotate the tube on a cutting board or a table makes the skin come off the clove. The tube peeler was invented by Ben Omessi, a retired American architect who was designing home items for people with disabilities and it was patented in 1998.

A food chopper can also be used to peel garlic, by replacing the blades with a central device having a surface featuring large bumps. The rotation will push the cloves to bounce between the wall and the bumpy surface, taking the skin off.

== See also ==
- Garlic press
