= Jean Mantelet =

French businessman

Jean Mantelet (10 August 1900 – 19 January 1991) was a French inventor and industrialist who founded the kitchen appliance company Moulinex.

== Early life ==
Mantelet was born in the east-Paris suburb of Rosny-sous-Bois to a family of artisans. His parents separated in 1903. His mother, working, placed him at the age of 12 in an apprenticeship at a hosiery shop in the Rue de Rivoli where he learned the basics of commerce and accounting. He won favour with the proprietor who saw the young man as his future successor. However the proprietor died in 1919 and Jean Mantelet was forced to join his father at his small hardware store.

== Professional career ==
Following his apprenticeships Mantelet studied at HEC Paris, and in 1922 established himself as a manufacturer of hand pumps and agricultural sprayers. In 1929, he opened a small workshop in Bagnolet where he made hand-powered kitchen equipment, which he named the Manufacture d'Emboutissage de Bagnolet. Three years later, he invented the prize-winning "Moulin-Légumes", a hand-crank food mill for mashing and puréeing vegetables. The design is considered a forerunner to the modern food processor.

Unable to expand further in Bagnolet, in 1937 Mantelet moved production to a converted flax mill in Alençon in the Normandy region, which was to become the company's base with the establishment of several other factories nearby. In the mid-1950s he developed his first electrically-operated appliance, a coffee-grinder with a motor, and as sales multiplied he chose to rename the company Moulinex as a contraction of "Moulin-Express". His innovations had by this time made him prosperous, and in 1978 he was listed among the 25 most wealthy people in France. From 1951 to 1973 he was a consultant on French foreign trade.

=== Civic life ===
Mantelet was a municipal councillor in Alençon from 1959 to 1965. From 1971 to 1974 he was president of the Alençon Chamber of Commerce. In 1991, shortly after his death, the Route de Mamers in Alençon was renamed Avenue Jean Mantelet.
