= Joe Ades =

English businessman

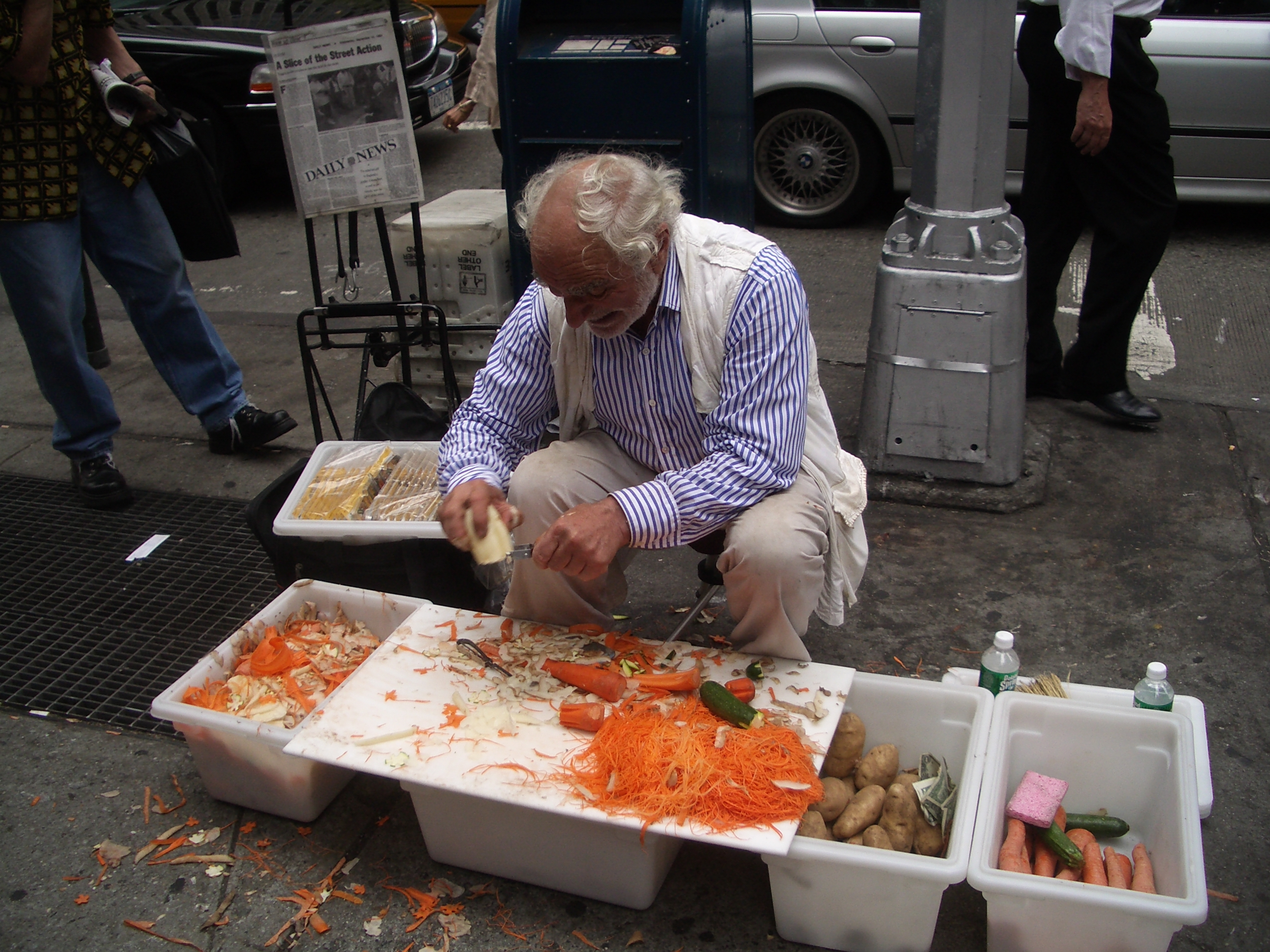
- Joe Ades in Union Square, 8 Aug 2005
- Born: 18 December 1933; Manchester, England
- Died: 1 February 2009 (aged 75); New York City, United States
- Citizenship: UK
- Occupation: Merchant
- Children: 3

Joseph H. Ades (/ˈɑːdɛs/; 18 December 1933 – 1 February 2009), also known as the "Gentleman Peeler", was a well-known British street merchant, long-based in New York City. He died one day after being notified his petition for US citizenship had been granted but before he could be naturalized.

== Early life ==
Joseph Ades, the youngest of seven children, was born to a Jewish family in Manchester, England, where his father worked in the textile industry. Leaving school at 15, he became an office boy before becoming intrigued by the local markets springing up in the World War II–devastated landscapes of Northern England. He started out hawking comic books before selling textiles, jewellery, and toys directly on the streets.

== Australia ==
In 1956, he married Shirley Unger, with whom he eventually had three children. The family moved to Australia in 1969 as Ten Pound Poms and settled in Sydney, where Ades tried to set up markets in the parking lots of drive-in movies. Eventually he sold goods at street fairs off of the back of a large truck. After his first marriage was dissolved in 1980, Ades remarried and divorced again.

== New York City ==
His third wife gave him a copy of London Labour and the London Poor by Henry Mayhew, a contemporary of Charles Dickens. The book recorded the activities of the street sellers of the Victorian period. Ades modelled himself on sellers that Mayhew called "the patterers", most of whom liked to ape the dress and mannerisms of gentlemen.

After the break-up of his third marriage and a period of residence in Ireland, Ades followed his daughter to New York City, taking up residence in Manhattan. From 1993 onward, Ades sold $5 Swiss-made metal potato peelers. His engaging sales patter and his $1,000 Chester Barrie suits and shirts from Turnbull & Asser made him a well-known character on his regular demo circuit, which included places such as the Union Square Greenmarket. Ades never obtained a license, meaning that he was often asked to move by the New York City Police Department. His iconoclastic pitches and lifestyle eventually brought him attention and notoriety, and he was the subject of a Vanity Fair article.

Ades enjoyed café society at the Pierre Hotel, on the Upper East Side, and lived with his fourth wife, Estelle Pascoe, in her three-bedroom apartment on Park Avenue. She died in 2007.

Ades died on 1 February 2009, aged 75, reportedly only one day after being informed that his petition for naturalization as a United States citizen had been approved. However, he did not live to be sworn in.

== Legacy ==
Ades was survived by his daughter and two sons from his first marriage. His daughter, Ruth Ades-Laurent, began selling the peelers in the same spots as her father, but was later forbidden from selling in Union Square.
