= Social technology =

Technology that enables social interactions

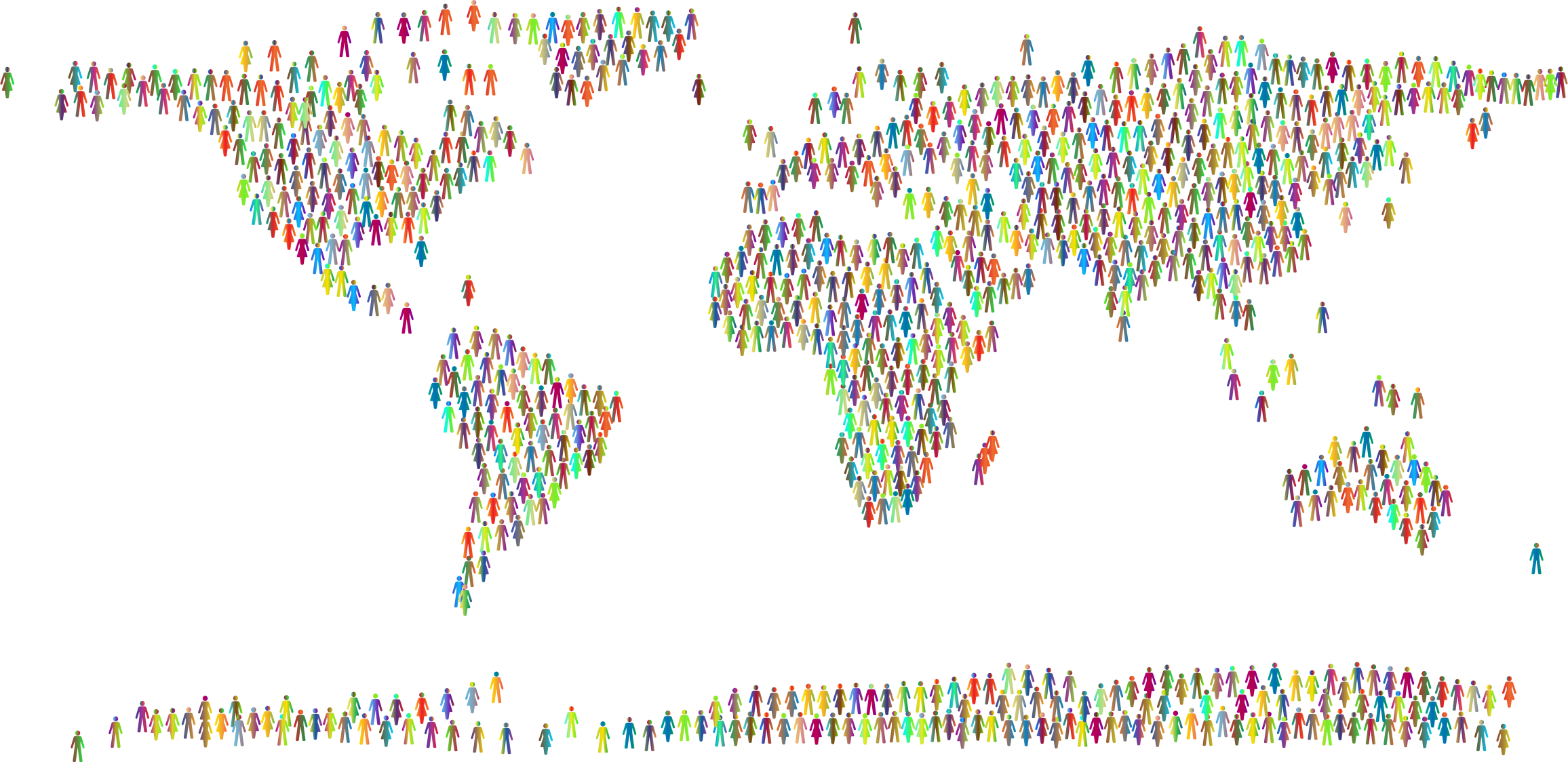
Social technology contributes to a networked society.

Social technology is a way of using human, intellectual and digital resources in order to influence social processes. For example, one might use social technology to ease social procedures via social software and social hardware, which might include the use of computers and information technology for governmental procedures or business practices. It has historically referred to two meanings: as a term related to social engineering, a meaning that began in the 19th century, and as a description of social software, a meaning that began in the early 21st century. Social technology is also split between human-oriented technologies and artifact-oriented technologies.

== History ==
The term "social technology" was first used at the University of Chicago by Albion Woodbury Small and Charles Richmond Henderson around the end of the 19th century. At a seminar in 1898, Small described social technology as the use of knowledge of the facts and laws of social life to bring about rational social aims. In 1895 Henderson coined the term "social art" for the methods by which improvements to society are introduced. According to Henderson, social art gives directions.

In 1901, Henderson published an article titled "The Scope of Social Technology" in which he renamed this social art as 'social technology', and described it as "a system of conscious and purposeful organization of persons in which every actual, natural social organization finds its true place, and all factors in harmony cooperate to realize an increasing aggregate and better proportions of the 'health, wealth, beauty, knowledge, sociability, and rightness' desires." In 1923, the term social technology was given a wider meaning in the works of Ernest Burgess and Thomas D. Eliot, who expanded the definition of social technology to include the application, particularly in social work, of techniques developed by psychology and other social sciences.

In 1928, Luther Lee Bernard defined applied science as the observation and measurement of norms or standards, which control our relationship with the universe. He then separated this definition from that of social technology by explaining that social technology also "includes administration as well as the determination of the norms which are to be applied in the administration". In 1935, he wrote an article called "The Place of Social Sciences in Modern Education," in which he wrote about the nature of an effective education in the social sciences to reach effective education by the willing masses. It would be of three types: Firstly, "a description of present conditions and trends in society". Secondly, "the teaching of desirable social ends and ideals necessary to correct such social maladjustments as we now have". Thirdly, "a system of social technology which, if applied, might be expected to remedy existing maladjustments and realize valid social ends". Bernard explained that the aspects of social technology which lags behind are the technologies involved in the "less material forms of human welfare". These are the applied sciences of "the control of crime, abolition of poverty, the raising of every normal person to economic, political, and personal competency, the art of good government, or city, rural, and national planning". On the other hand, "the best developed social technologies, such as advertising, finance, and 'practical' politics, are used in the main for antisocial rather than for proper humanitarian ends".

After the Second World War, the term 'social technology' continued to be used intermittently, for example by the social psychologist Dorwin Cartwright for techniques developed in the science of group dynamics such as 'buzz groups' and role playing and by Olaf Helmer to refer to the Delphi technique for creating a consensus opinion in a panel of experts. More recent examples are Human rights & social technology by Rainer Knopff and Tom Flanagan which addresses both human rights and government policies that ensure them. Another example is Theodore Caplow's Perverse incentives: the neglect of social technology in the public sector, which discusses a wide range of topics, including use of the death penalty to discourage crime and the welfare system to provide for the needy.

At the current stage of social technology research, two main directions of usage of this term have emerged: (a) human-oriented technologies and (b) artifact-oriented technologies.

According to the goal of social technology adaption, technologies oriented toward humans consist of:

- Technologies of power
  - Fundamental legal regulations
  - System of signs and symbols
  - Participation technologies
- Group behavior pattern creation
  - Information transfer mediation
  - Eugenics
- Individual behavior pattern creation
  - Legal norms
  - Technologies of the self

Technologies oriented toward artifacts consist of:

- Social interaction technologies
  - Relation creation and sustainment technologies
  - Co-operation technologies
- Knowledge development technologies
  - Information aggregation technologies
  - Resource compilation technologies
  - Expertise location technologies

== As "social engineering" ==
Closely related to social technology is the term social engineering. Thorstein Veblen used 'social engineering' in 1891, but suggested that it was used earlier. In the 1930s both 'social engineering and 'social technology' became associated with the large scale socio-economic policies of the Soviet Union. The Soviet economist Yvgeni Preobrazhensky wrote a book in which he defined social technology as "the science of organized production, organized labour, of organized systems of production relations, where the legality of economic existence is expressed in new forms." (p. 55 in the translation of 1963)

Karl Popper discusses social technology and social engineering in his book The Open Society and Its Enemies and in the article "The Poverty of Historicism", in which he criticized the Soviet political system and the Marxist theory (Marxism) on which it was based. Eventually he combined "The Poverty of Historicism" series in a book "The Poverty of Historicism" which he wrote "in memory of the countless men and women of all creeds or nations or races who fell victim to the fascist and communist belief in Inexorable Laws of Historical Destiny". In his book "The Open Society and Its Enemies", Popper distinguished two kinds of social engineering, and the corresponding social technology. Utopian engineering strives to reach "an ideal state, using a blueprint of society as a whole, is one which demands a strong centralized rule of a few, and which therefore is likely to lead to a dictatorship" (p. 159). Communism is an example of utopian social Technology. On the other hand, there is the piecemeal engineer with its corresponding social technology, which adopts "the method of searching for, and fighting against, the greatest and most urgent evils of society, rather than searching for, and fighting for, its greatest ultimate good" (p. 158). The use of piecemeal social technology is crucial for democratic social reconstruction.

== As "social software" ==
"Social technology" has also been used as a synonym for "social software", such as in the book Groundswell: Winning in a World Transformed by Social Technologies, by Charlene Li and Josh Bernoff.

=== Social networking service ===
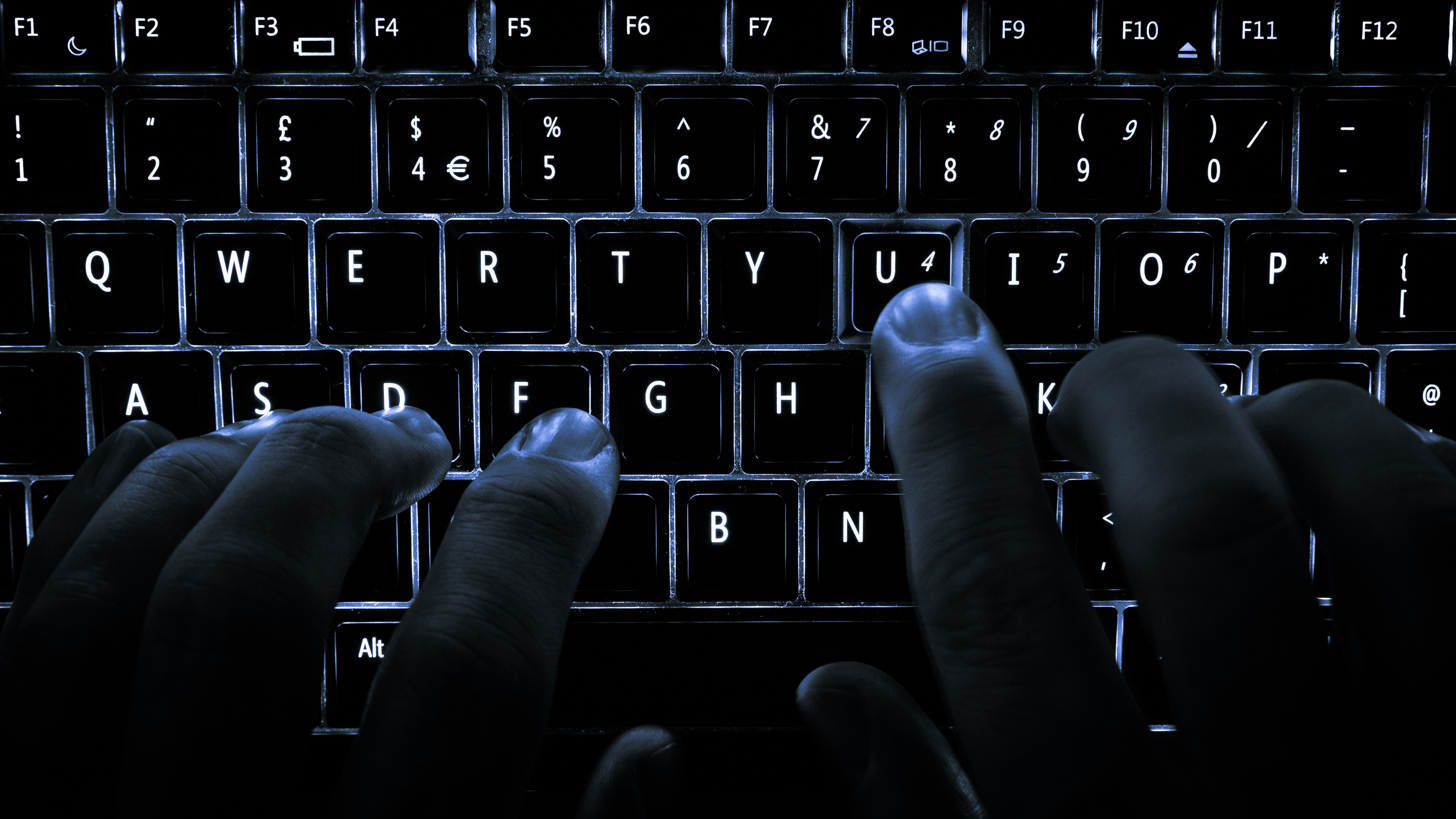
Using digital resources to influence social processes

A social networking service is a platform to build social networks or social relations among people who, for example, share interests, activities, backgrounds, or real-life connections.

=== Corporate social media ===
Corporate social media is the use of social media platforms, social media communications, and social media marketing techniques by and within corporations, ranging from small businesses and tiny entrepreneurial startups to mid-size businesses and huge multinational firms.

Within the definition of social media, there are different ways corporations utilize it. Although there is no systematic way in which social media applications can be categorized, there are various methods and approaches to having a strong social media presence. Social media currently can be crucial to the success of growing numbers in a companies value chain activities.

=== Enterprise social software ===
Of particular interest in the realm of social computing is social software for enterprise. Sometimes referred to as "Enterprise 2.0", a term derived from Web 2.0, this generally refers to the use of social computing in corporate intranets and in other medium and large-scale business environments.

"Social technology" is also used to refer to the organization and management of private companies, and is sometimes taught under the auspices of university business schools. One book with this orientation is The social technology of organization development, by Warner and Hornstein. Social technology changes the way that people communicate; for instance, it enables people across the world to collaborate. This technology shapes society and thus could be considered as a disruptive technology.

Chief Strategy Officer at Jive Software, Christopher Morace, explains that "social technology is changing the way businesses operate and how successful companies are leveraging it to their advantage." Some of the key drivers of a business provided by the use of social technology are collaboration, open communication, and a large network. In addition, business professionals must maintain digital literacy in order to understand the capabilities of social technologies and incorporate them into daily function.

== Other uses ==
Social technology can provide opportunities for digital activism. It eliminates geographic boundaries, potentially enabling protests and revolutions to spread through social technologies. It can also be argued that digital activism through social technology does not produce concrete results, as people might lose sight of what drives the social movement and ultimately participate in "clicktivism." Due to technological advances, social technology could potentially redefine what it means to be an activist.

Social technology is also a prevalent influence in the realm of e-commerce. "The development and rapid growth of mobile computing and smartphones have also facilitated social commerce." Marketing strategies have evolved over the years to conform and align with social technology.

In 1985, Donald MacKenzie and Judy Wajcman published a book titled The social shaping of technology. It showed that technological change is often seen as something that follows its own logic, and introduced about the relation of technology to society and different types of technology are examined: the technology of production; domestic and reproductive technology; and military technology. It moves on to the technologies of the household and biological reproduction, and it also asks what shapes the most frightening technology of all––the technology of weaponry, especially nuclear weapons.

In 2011, Bettina Leibetseder published her article "A Critical Review on the Concept of Social Technology". She pointed that social technology provides social science knowledge for a purpose. Such a notion allows an in depth debate about the meaning of social order in modern societies. Social technology forms the basis of governmental decisions; it allows for a use of social theories and methods for a purpose in politics and introduces a specific conception of power between the individual and public powers.

== Concerns ==
Social technologies, as they are technologies dealing with social behaviors or interactions, have caused concerns among philosophers. As Vladislav A. Lektorsky pointed out in his journal, "The Russian philosopher Viacheslav Stëpin calls modern European civilization "technogenic." Initially, this meant the pursuit of technologies for the control of natural phenomena. Then projects began to be put forward for social technologies for the control of social processes. Based on this concept, impacts that social technology might have for man, like "Forcible Collectivization", or the deportation of ethnic groups are recognized because according to Vladislav, social technology blunts the individual's capacity for critical reflection, though it "presents a different possibility which be used to develop man’s creative capacities, to expand his realm of freedom and his social and interpersonal ties."

Similarly, social technology also poses potential threats to human rights. These concerns are based on the notion that humans are a product of their environment. "Social technology assumes that it is possible to know the societal or 'systematic' determinants of human 'behavior' in a way that permits them to be manipulated and controlled." Technology can also overcome certain social forces.

Social technologies have also caused concern among social scientists. According to a study conducted by the Cambridge University Press, it is possible for social technologies to manipulate social processes, including relationship development and group dynamics. Variables such as gender and social status can influence a person's behavior, and these behavior changes can translate to interactions through technology. Social technologies also relate to the theory of technological determinism, which states that "technology has universal effects on social processes."

As the online internet presence of the general population grows, the popularity of social technology increases, which creates a culture of sharing. Internet users develop more connections online due to the global activity on the internet, and as services make it possible to upload content, they likewise facilitate widespread distribution of information. As opinions circulate online, concerns over new problems arise.

== Other similar phrases ==
In general, social technology covers many other terms in social science, as some authors use "social technique", "social pedagogy", "administrative technique", "technocracy", "socio-technique", "socio-technical impact", "political science engineering", "planned society", "efficiency engineer", "social (economic) planning"

== See also ==
- Social
- Technology
- Technological innovation
- Technology and society
- Sociotechnology
- Social innovation
- Social engineering (political science)
- Social shaping of technology
- Social software
- Social software (social procedure)
- Social procedure
