= Groundswell (book) =

2008 book by Charlene Li and Josh Bernoff

Groundswell: Winning in a world transformed by social technologies
- Author: Charlene Li and Josh Bernoff
- Language: English
- Subject: Social Technology
- Genre: Non-fiction
- Publisher: Harvard Business Press
- Publication date: 2008
- Publication place: United States
- Pages: 286
- ISBN: 978-1-4221-2500-7
- OCLC: 172980082
- Dewey Decimal: 303.48/33 22
- LC Class: HC79.I55 .L48 2008

Groundswell is a book by Forrester Research executives Charlene Li and Josh Bernoff that focuses on how companies can take advantage of emerging social technologies. It was published in 2008 by Harvard Business Press. A revised edition was published in 2011.

The book attempts to explain a shift in the relationship between customers and companies, in which companies are no longer able to control customers' attitudes through market research, customer service, and advertising. Instead, customers are controlling the conversation by using new media to communicate about products and companies.

== Synopsis ==
The groundswell is characterized by several tactics that guide companies into using social technologies strategically and effectively.

1. Listening: Businesses should listen to their customers to understand what the market is looking for in their products. In order to do this, a company needs to find out if their customers are using social technologies and how they are using them.
2. Talking: Instead of advertising to customers, marketing departments should find creative ways to connect with users about their experience with a product and their feelings about the brand. One common method is participation in social networks.
3. Energizing: Enthusiastic customers are part of the groundswell, and companies can recognize and appreciate these customers by creating online communities and social platforms where they can connect with the brand and provide reviews.
4. Supporting: Businesses can harness the support of their own employees by creating internal social applications for them to connect with the brand, also known as enterprise social software.

== Groundswell in action ==
=== Examples ===
Some companies distinguish their product through the use of social technologies. Tom Dickson successfully marketed his Blendtec line of blenders through the viral marketing campaign Will It Blend? The groundswell spread marketing messages through Digg and YouTube with a small budget and little marketing experience.

Other companies have been able to listen to and talk with the groundswell by building their own online communities. Procter & Gamble created beinggirl.com to introduce girls to P&G feminine care products. The community approach worked because the company could reach girls with information that might seem embarrassing or sensitive in a traditional marketing campaign.

=== Risks ===
Features of particular industries or companies can make direct customer engagement more difficult. For instance, some companies must work within industry regulations, national or multinational corporations must balance corporate and local engagement, and other companies must find ways to engage with customers on time-sensitive issues.

== Reception ==
Kevin Allison of the Financial Times praised the book for its focus on Web analytics: "[Groundswell] is not so much a manifesto or a dissection of online culture as it is a how-to manual for executives and mid-level managers trying to navigate this fast-changing and often confusing environment."

The book won the American Marketing Association Foundation’s Berry-AMA Book Prize for best marketing book of 2009. It was also listed by:

- Amazon, as one of the Top 10 Business & Investing Books of 2008
- CIO Insight, as one of the Top 10 Business-Tech Books of 2008 and one of 10 Insightful Web 2.0 Books
- Fortune as Magazine as one of the 3 best Web books of 2008
- Advertising Age as number 3 of 10 Books You Should Have Read
- BusinessWeek as one of the Best Innovation & Design Books of 2008
- "strategy+business" as one of the Best Business Books 2008 and “Top Shelf” in Marketing
