= Mallowstreet =

Online financial networking community

mallowstreet
- Industry: Pension
- Founded: 2010
- Headquarters: London

mallowstreet is an online financial social networking community within the pension industry. The mallowstreet.com website is an enterprise social software application featuring blogs, forums, videos, papers and financial products. Members must have an association with a pension fund as a trustee or consultant. However, the site also allows product providers associated with an organisation targeting the pensions industry, such as a bank, to join although many parts of the site may be restricted. In August 2010 the community was made up of 730 users, representing 200 pension funds managing £500 billion in assets. In October 2011, the community consists of 2,100 users, representing 580 pension funds managing over £1 trillion in assets.

== History ==
mallowstreet was co-founded by Dawid Konotey-Ahulu and Robert Gardner of Redington, a London-based consultancy firm. The mallowstreet.com website was launched in November 2009. mallowstreet is now a separate Private Limited company.

On 10 August 2010, members of the mallowstreet community wrote to the Government of the United Kingdom claiming that plans to link private pension increases to the Consumer Price Index measure of inflation instead of the Retail Price Index could "breach human rights".

mallowstreet was awarded Innovation of the Year by Life & Pension Risk in October 2010.

On 18 May 2011, mallowstreet held a conference, The mallowstreet Exchange, for its members with a keynote speech by the Minister of State for Pensions, Steve Webb, MP. It was discussed how mallowstreet could be used to devise working solutions for the industry using the wisdom of the crowd. For example, the potential of the mallowstreet community to devise a compelling savings fund for young people.

mallowstreet began beta testing a select group of non-UK users predominantly from Canada, the Netherlands and Ireland in 2011. As a result of the success of the testing, mallowstreet has begun to accept, and has a growing membership of, non-UK users from the global pensions community.
