= ExpoTV =

Expo Tv
- Nickname: شبکه اکسپو
- Formation: 4K, 1080i, 720
- Type: Private
- Location: Iran
- Official language: Persian - English
- Website: www.irexpotv.com

EXPO Tv or ExpoTV (شبکه اکسپو) is an Internet TV network (video platform) in Iran that prepares, produces and broadcasts video products. It was established in 2018. The company was discussed in Groundswell, a book by Forrester analysts.
