= Reissued.com =

- Industry: E-commerce
- Founded: 2014
- Founder: Jennifer DeLonge
- Headquarters: Encinitas, California, U.S.A.
- Key people: Jennifer DeLonge, Founder & Chief Curator; Scott Ballantyne, CEO
- Products: Vintage Merchandise
- Website: reissued.com

Reissued.com was an online marketplace for vintage, rare, and one-of-a-kind merchandise. Founded by product and interior designer Jennifer DeLonge, it operated as a curated marketplace with items ranging from fashion, furniture, art, and music. Curators chosen by the company pick items they wish to sell to their followers, causing a comparison of the company to Twitter and Instagram. Headquartered in Encinitas, California, revenue for the company was generated from service fees from items sold through the marketplace.

== History ==
Reissued.com was founded by Jennifer DeLonge in 2014. She created the site combining her love of vintage shopping with mobile commerce, launching as a mobile app available through the iTunes Store in May 2014. Initially considered an enterprise social network, curators chosen by the company are allowed to sell vintage items to their followers. Initial curators included Decades, Urban Americana, OneFortyThree, A Current Affair, Ascot & Hart, and DeLonge herself. The company allows curators to control their own profiles and select the items that they wish to sell, allowing for affordable items to be sold alongside high-end collectibles. Revenue for the site is generated from taking a small portion of each transaction as a service fee. Additional items included 20 pieces of Anjelica Huston's personal wardrobe, ranging in price from $200 to $1,200 each.

Funding for Reissued.com came from undisclosed investors in the amount of $500,000. To launch the app, the company brought on 14 employees which included an advisory board of notable executives such as Gary Swart, Fab co-founder Brad Shellhammer, and Michael Levinson from Facebook.

The company website and app have been defunct since April 2015.

== See also ==
- Second-hand shop
