= Corporate social media =

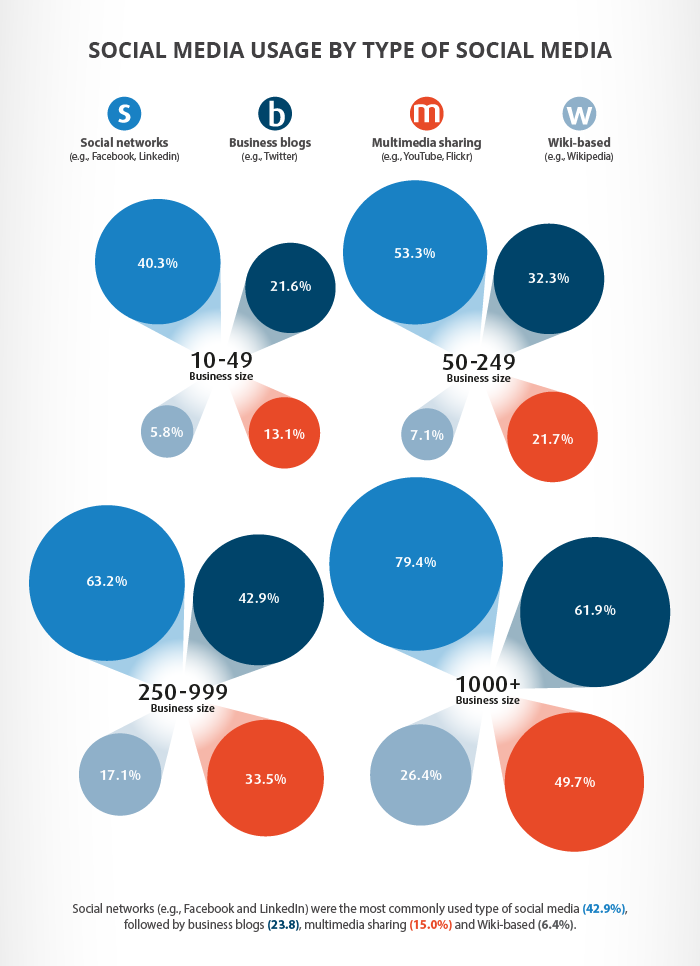
This chart shows the four major social media platforms used by UK businesses as of 2013: social networking websites; blogs; multimedia sharing websites, and user-edited wiki websites.

Corporate social media is the use of social media platforms, social media communications and social media marketing techniques by and within corporations, ranging from small businesses and tiny entrepreneurial startups to mid-size businesses and huge multinational firms. Within the definition of social media, there are different ways corporations utilize it. Although there is no systematic way in which social media applications can be categorized, there are various methods and approaches to having a strong social media presence.

Social media currently can be crucial to the success of growing numbers in a companies value chain activities. For marketers, Social media is a mandatory element within the promotional mix. Marketers also need to understand that marketing on social media can come with difficulties and challenges, and face both reputation and economic risks. This big push to move to Social Media to is thought to create a better experience with the consumers, as corporations are able to target specific content to their target audience. Another benefit for corporations through usage of media is that this will attract more people, and in return also create a more well known brand.

== History and development ==
In the 2010s, an increasing number of corporations, across most industries, have adopted the use of social media either within the workplace, for employees, as part of an Intranet or using the publicly available Internet. As a result, corporate use of social networking and micro blogging sites such as Facebook, Twitter, Pinterest, and LinkedIn, has substantially increased.

A 2010 report indicated that two-thirds of companies had or would have social media initiatives in place.

According to an article by the Harvard Business Review from 2014, "Fifty-eight percent of companies are currently engaged in social networks like Facebook, micro blogs like Twitter, and sharing multimedia on platforms such as YouTube." The Harvard Business Review cites an additional 21 % of companies as being in the process of implementing a formal social media initiative. The 2014 HBR report indicates 79 % of companies have or will have social media initiatives in place.

According to research conducted in 2021, 91.9 percent of marketing employees working for large corporations (100 or more people) use social media on a daily basis in their jobs. This statistic has changed a lot over the years, and continues to grow.

== Budgeting and corporate roles ==
Budgets for utilizing corporate social media is growing every year by millions of dollars. Jobs like social media managers and coordinators have made it so this is an entire department of a company. It goes hand in hand with the marketing, communications, and PR teams in order to optimize strategies for the corporation to be connected to their audience.

== Types ==
Aichner and Jacob (2015) give the following typology:

| Type of social media | Definition | Example |
|---|---|---|
| Blogs | Postings created by individuals or companies relating to news and information that is generated and separated chronologically. | BuzzFeed |
| Business networks | Created to keep in contact with other professional and to create a profile to explain and represent who they are and what their experiences are. It allows for companies to position themselves better to find new employees. | LinkedIn |
| Collaborative projects | Brings internet users together that want to collaborate on a common subject in order to better the subject or develop it. | Wikipedia |
| Enterprise social networks | A network used for a specific company or group, that is similar to social media networks. It allows people in the company to better get to know each other and increase efficiency of knowledge. | Socialcast |
| Forums | A forum is a place/ platform that allows users to exchange thoughts, conversations & questions. It is open to the public and doesn't happen live. | IGN Boards |
| Microblogs | Microblogs are sites that restrict the posted content to being under 200 characters. | Twitter |
| Photosharing | Websites that allow you to upload and manage photos that you are also able to share. It allows other users to edit and comment on others postings. | Drop Box |
| Products/services review | Allows customers to evaluate certain products and services from companies which allows other to see how the product or service is before they purchase it or use it. | Yelp |
| Social bookmarking | A platform that allows a way to save websites and bookmarks to share with other users. | Pinterest |
| Social gaming | Games on the internet allow users or generated users to interact with each other, that might even count as social interactions. | Fortnite |
| Social networks | A way, via the internet, to connect people who have things in common. Companies usually create corporate pages to keep customers and updates and engaged. Users create individual profiles with personal information and pictures. | Instagram |
| Video sharing | Sites that allow users to upload and watch videos that are legal. Most times it works like social sites where you can comment on them. Companies will utilize this to save on costs on commercials and ads. | YouTube |
| Virtual worlds | Virtual Worlds are sites where you create an avatar and participate in virtual reality activities and communicate with others. The virtual world goes on even if it isn't being used. | Poptropica |

== Policies ==
Social media has grown rapidly over the last decade and has become an integral component of business models. Because of the global use of social media, corporations are developing and implementing formal written policies for how their corporation will present itself on social media. In addition to this, corporations are often conscious about how their employees present themselves and their company on social media. Before social media, a company had complete control with what they communicated to the public. Now, virtually any employee can speak on behalf of the company, even without proper permission or following protocol. This can create conflict between corporate policy and those in decision making roles versus employees. For example, the Federal Financial Institutions Examination Council, a consortium of bank and credit union regulators, implemented in December 2013, formal social media guidance for its banks and credit unions. In the eyes of regulators, risks associated with social media use are of a level that requires formal attention. At a minimum, regulators require that organizations "listen" to what is being said about them on social media platforms in an effort to identify legal, compliance, and reputational concerns.

Corporations have legitimate concerns when it comes to their employees’ use of social media. Social media environments have created the need for distinct and often strict reputation management practices. Some corporations have resorted to monitoring the social media accounts of its employees in order to spot posts and comments that are related to workplace issues or the employer, potentially harmful to business or even leak private corporate information.

Many corporations have used social media during the hiring process as well. Survey data shows that within a one-year period 15 percent of finance and accounting professionals found new jobs through social media. Social media can be both helpful and detrimental to those searching for employment. Hiring managers sometimes search social media to look for reasons not to hire a job applicant. According to a 2013 survey from CareerBuilder.com, 43 percent of employers use social networking sites to research potential hires. Another 45 percent are researching the "fit" of a job candidate with their company by conducting a search via Google or another search engine. 51 percent of employers who research candidates on social media say they've found postings which have caused them to not hire a candidate. Job applicants who have racist or homophobic jokes, inappropriate photos, offensive content, or photos depicting drunkenness or other potentially undesirable behaviors may be screened out of hiring processes. Some observers have stated that employer viewing of job candidates' social media profiles may raise privacy concerns.

== Benefits and risks ==
Despite there being risks to consider when utilizing social media, corporations are identifying the benefits associated with adopting a comprehensive corporate social media strategy. Benefits include lower cost and more effective, personal, and engaging marketing and advertising initiatives (as compared with traditional marketing methods such as billboard ads and TV commercials), improved internal and external corporate communications, enhanced overall brand awareness, and better operational efficiency and innovativeness. As a result, corporations are investing at an increasing rate in social media software and external services to strengthen their online presence. The belief is that the benefits outweigh the potential risks of bad press, customer complaints, and brand bashing. Benefits also include being able to interact one on one with the consumers and talking directly to them through social media platforms. This creates trust in businesses and gives customers more chances to build loyalty and commitment to a brand.

Conversely, businesses can find themselves in a bad situation when they use social media poorly. An example of poor social media execution came in November 2013 when JP Morgan decided to have a question and answer session via Twitter. During that time, 2 out of 3 tweets received were negative due to prior scrutiny they had faced. In this case, using social media and interacting with the public did not help to promote them in a positive way. Another example came on September 11, 2013, when AT&T posted a picture on Twitter of a cell phone capturing a picture of the Twin Towers memorial lights with the caption "Never forget." The tweet was met with great backlash from consumers for using a tragedy as a marketing opportunity, with many customers threatening to leave AT&T. After seeing the backlash it was receiving, AT&T removed the post and apologized within about an hour of its posting. Risks also include, losing the interest of the people on social media because there is a lack of activity, the content is not interesting, or it is not professional or honest.

== See also ==
- Enterprise social networking
- Enterprise social software
- Social media use by businesses
