= Social procedure =

The term social procedure is sometimes applied to any of the procedures carried out by people in various areas of society, such as legislative assemblies, judicial systems, and resource arbiters, like banks or other lending organizations. It has been described as social software and indeed does resemble software.

Social procedures include as a subset procedures which are at the foundation of our society, such as procedural law. Similarly many social procedures are explicitly designed to ensure fair treatment to individuals or corporations, as official records of parliamentary debates show.

Multiple social procedures can serve to achieve the same end. Justice, as an example, in the U.S. achieved through the use of 2 adversarial lawyers, a neutral judge, and a jury of peers. In Canada, the judge is less neutral. This subtle difference in programming has an effect on the justice outcome.

Though game theory is a highly technical subject with no special attention to sports, an example of a social procedure designed to help make a sporting system more fair is the Major League Baseball draft whereby the teams which performed the worst in the last season get the first choice of players for the new season.

There is a project called A Formal Analysis of Social Procedures underway at the Tilburg Center for Logic and Philosophy of Science (TiLPS) under the direction of E. Pacuit. This interdisciplinary project looks at social procedures undertaken by rational and not-so-rational people, and the complex phenomena arising when the people involved in such procedures interact.

== See also ==
- Social software (social procedure)
- Social technology
