= Sociotechnology =

Study of processes on the intersection of society and technology

Sociotechnology (short for "social technology") is the study of processes on the intersection of society and technology. Vojinović and Abbott define it as "the study of processes in which the social and the technical are indivisibly combined". Sociotechnology is an important part of socio-technical design, which is defined as "designing things that participate in complex systems that have both social and technical aspects".

The term has been attributed to Mario Bunge. He defines it as a grouping of social engineering and management science. He sees it thus as a form of technology, distinguished from other branches of it such as engineering, biotechnology, information technology and general technology. Its goal is to help engineer sociosystems and evaluate their performance, while making use of social science research. In short, sociotechnology can be seen as the creation, modification and maintenance of social systems.

Writing on sociotechnical change, Bijker wrote: "Society is not determined by technology, nor is technology determined by society. Both emerge as two sides of the sociotechnical coin."

Technology is the sum of ways in which social groups construct the material objects of their civilizations. The things made are socially constructed just as much as technically constructed. The merging of these two things, construction and insight, is sociotechnology. "For example, we typically build a bridge when there's some expectation that people need to get from Point A to Point B, and there's something they need to bypass along the way (e.g. a river, a canyon, another road). Failure to consider the social factors as well as the technical factors could lead to a "bridge to nowhere" – and we all know at least one person who's had a problem with those".

== Business ==
Business use "richness and reach". The richness and reach strategy has evolved with technology. Richness is the ability to understand the information being passed; for example, calling someone is less rich than face to face contact. Reach is the number of people who exchange the information. In the past it was easier to complete richness and reach, but now with new technologies like video chatting, it is easier for business to do fulfill both richness and reach. Positive economics is the study of existing (or historical) means of exchange- a social science such as sociology, history, and political sciences. Normative economics is the social technology because it attempts to create different kinds of economic arrangements.

== Community and technology ==
Accelerating growth of technology is a major problem and cause of destabilization of a communicational world. Paul Virilio believes that the "real" is being mistaken by virtual and the virtual world destroys physical presence. Marshall McLuhan wrote about the extension of human senses and the nervous system into the world through electronic media. Essentially he believes that the mind, the self, and consciousness are made from already created technology, media, and language as opposed to create naturally like those who made technology, media, and language. The image of one's self becomes aware of itself in a world of technology. Consciousness and desire become less individualistic and turns into more already constituted social forms. The response to how someone feels something, what it means, and how it feels (for example feeling "attached" to someone after losing your virginity to them) is already set up through media communication (show, music, movies, articles). People will anticipate that they will be attached because of what they already know about it, so when it happens they do feel attached because that is how they were programmed to feel. People have turned to technology to create their "self" and determine how they feel and act. The conscious mind does not move into a world-as-other mindset but into an already constituted world.

Lewis Mumford believed the world of relying on technology began with early human experiments in industrialization including coal mines because coal and iron built and powered industrialization. It has come to the point where communication is relied on technology. Conversation turned into talking through a machine (texting, phone calls, social media).

The difference between the past and present technology is the extent of social binding. The more social forces it binds together the more powerful the technology is. For example, the attack on the World Trade Center as opposed to the attack of Pearl Harbor. It took a year to see the film of the attack on the American battleships. Because of this, people were more unaware and it was less of a big deal than what 9-11 was. During the terrorist attack in 2001, everything was broadcast in the moment. People were seeing the destruction with their own eyes in the moment, causing more passion for the situation.

== Robots replacing people ==
Furbie and Tamagotchi are electronic toys made for children that make noises and demand for care. These toys caused children to form a companionship with robots instead of human beings. Paro is a robotic baby seal that was created in Japan to perform therapeutic functions. Paro had positive psychological results for those in nursing homes. A woman constantly argued with her son and turned to the Paro for comfort and confided in the Paro instead of fixing things with her son. Society has turned to demanding more intimacy from sociable robots then from each other. People that use the robots for comfort feel like they are being comforted by someone even though they are actually alone. These robotic characters cause people to have a relationship with technology while avoiding the trouble of human interaction.

== Social technology ==
Science and technology are big contributions to the economic development, but can also lead to negative side effects as it evolves. For example, people care more about materialistic things than the negative influences they have created in human morals and education. For example, it is more important for people to know words to songs than to remember things for their test. There are other problems due to the development of new technologies such as the conservation of the environment because there is a demand for more products which leads to more destruction of environment to build more to sell from. Many social problems have appeared in society and cannot seem to be solved by natural science and technology alone. It requires the need for social sciences as well. Social technology is the strategy used to help solve the wrong behaviors in the world that are caused by social problems like how to solve the issue of people being invested in materialistic goods more than morals, so that they economy can still continue to grow, and society can be a better place.

Organizational theory borrows from sociotechnology through its use of sociotechnical systems, a subset of the concept of sociotechnology.

== See also ==
- Philosophy of technology
- Science, technology and society
- Social shaping of technology
- Social innovation
- Social technology
- Technological determinism
- Technological innovation
- Technology and society
