= Blender (appliance) =

Kitchen appliance used to crush food or make liquid

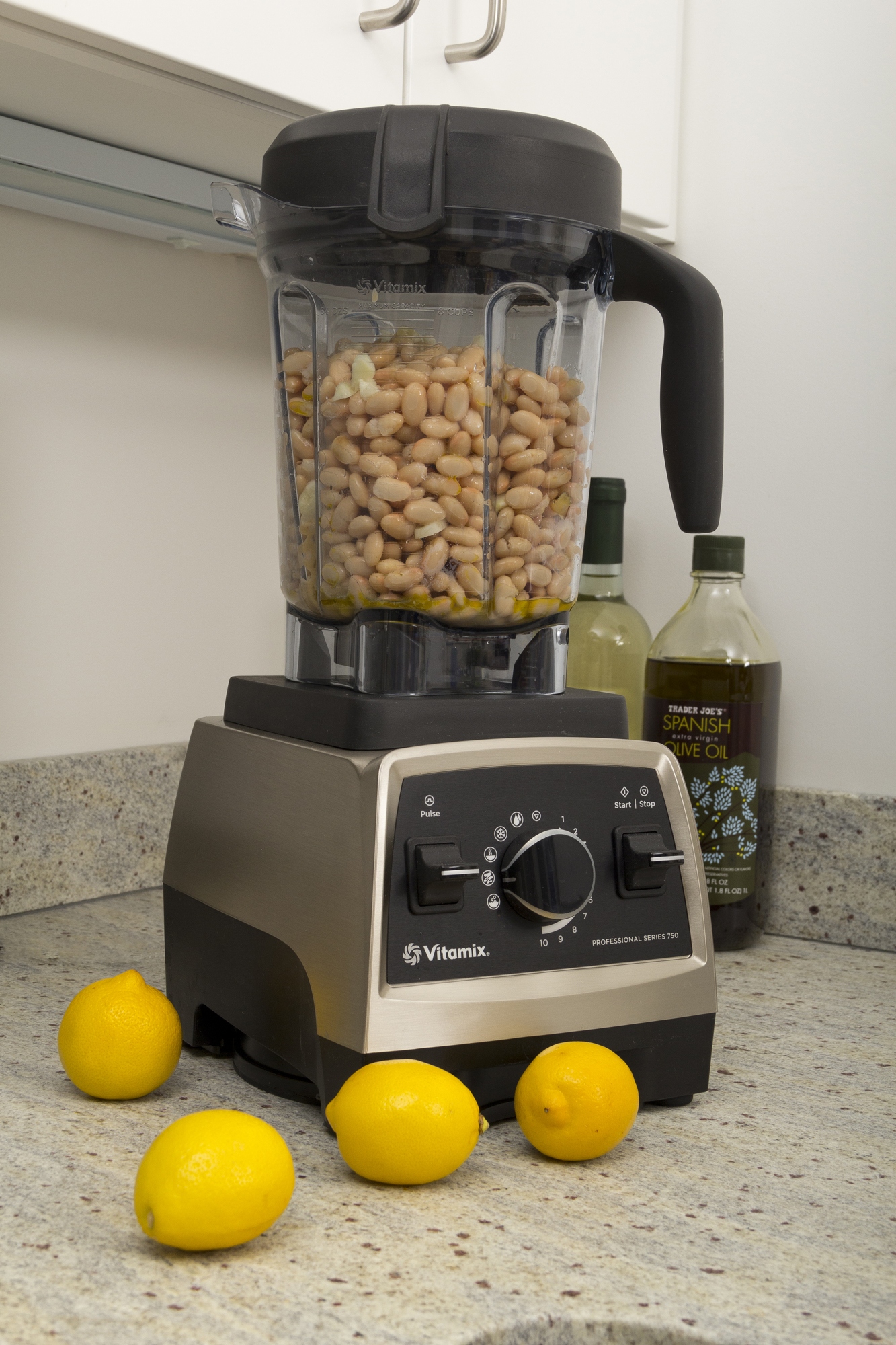
An electric blender

A blender (sometimes called a mixer or liquidiser in British English) is a kitchen and laboratory appliance used to mix, crush, purée or emulsify food and other substances. A stationary blender consists of a blender container with a rotating metal or plastic blade at the bottom, powered by an electric motor that is in the base. Some powerful models can also crush ice and other frozen foods. The newer immersion blender configuration has a motor on top connected by a shaft to a rotating blade at the bottom, which can be used with any container.

== Characteristics ==
Different blenders have different functions and features but product testing indicates that many blenders, even the less expensive ones, are useful for meeting many consumer needs. Features which consumers consider when purchasing a blender include the following:

- large visible measurement marks
- ease of use
- low noise during usage
- power usage (typically 300–1000 watts)
- ease of cleaning
- option for quick "pulse" blending

=== Countertop blenders ===
Countertop blenders use a blending container of 1 to 2 litres (1 to 2 US qt) blending container made of glass, plastic, stainless steel. Glass blenders are heavier and more stable. Plastic is prone to scratching and absorbing the smell of blended food. Stainless steel is preferred for its appearance, but limits visibility of the food as it is blended.

Countertop blenders typically offer 2–16 speed settings, but having more choices in speed settings is not an indication of increased utility for all users.

In cases where the blades are removable, the container should have an O-ring or gasket between the body of the container and the base to seal the container and prevent the contents from leaking. The blending container is generally shaped in a way that encourages material to circulate through the blades, rather than simply spinning around.

The container rests upon a base that contains a motor for turning the blade assembly and has controls on its surface. Most modern blenders offer a number of possible speeds. Low-powered blenders require the addition of some liquid to operate correctly. In these blenders, the liquid helps move the solids around the jar, bringing them in contact with the blades. The blades create a whirlpool effect which moves solids from top to bottom, ensuring even contact with the blade. This creates a homogeneous mixture. High-powered blenders are capable of milling grains and crushing ice without such assistance.

=== Immersion blenders ===
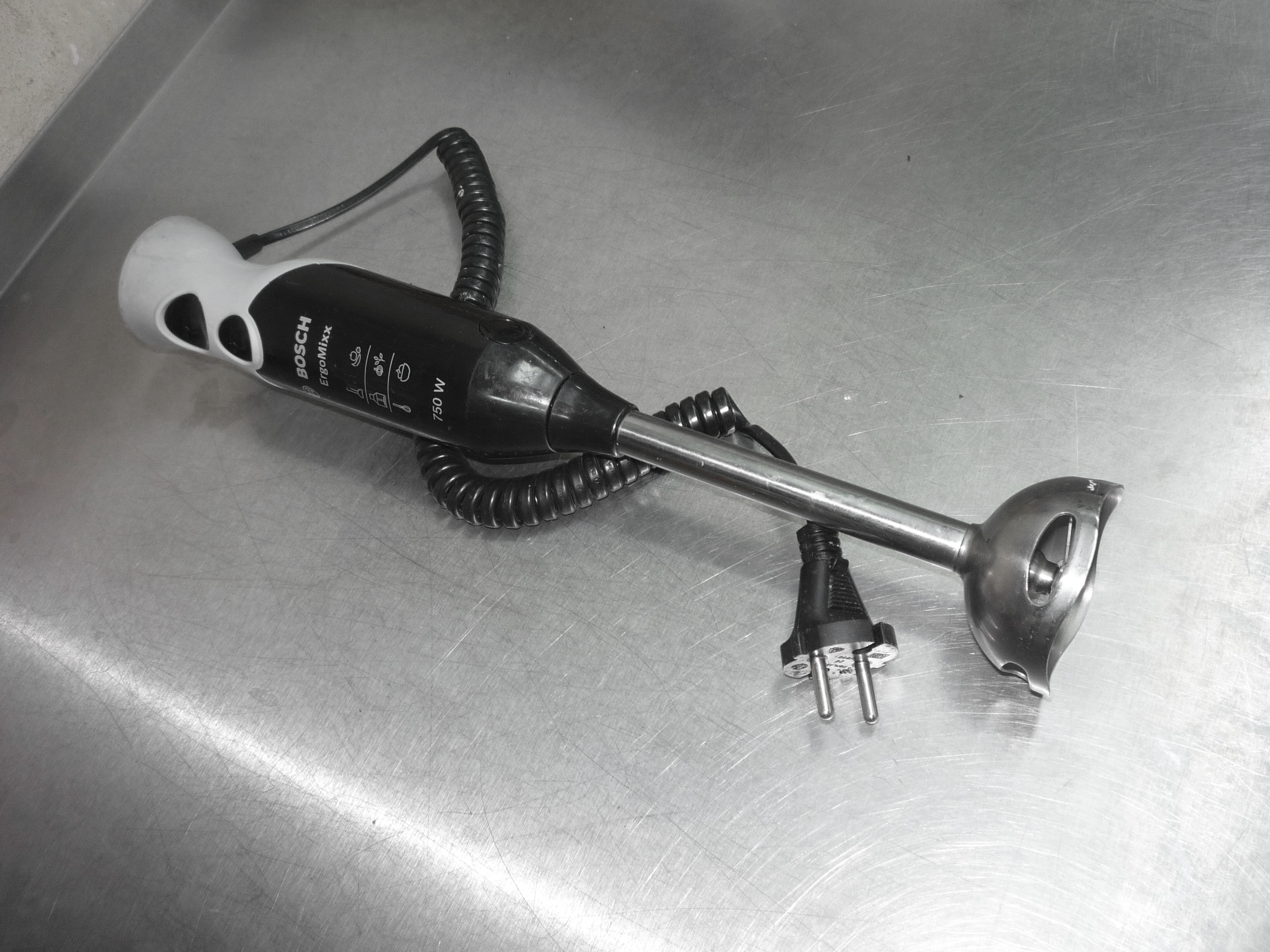
An immersion blender

The hand-held immersion blender, stick blender, hand blender or wand blender has no container of its own, but instead has a mixing head with rotating blades that can be immersed in a container. Immersion blenders are convenient for homogenizing volumes that are too large to fit in the bowl of a stationary blender or as in the case of soups, are too hot to be safely poured into the bowl.

The operation of an immersion blender requires that the user hold down a switch for as long as the blades operate, which can be tiresome for the user.

Handheld blenders are particularly used for small and specific tasks but do not have as many uses as a countertop blender.

== Applications ==
Countertop blenders are designed to mix, purée, and chop food. Their strength is such that the ability to crush ice is an expected feature.

Blenders are used both in home and commercial kitchens for various purposes, including to:

- Grind semi-solid ingredients, such as fresh fruits and vegetables, into smooth purées
- Blend ice cream, milk, and sweet sauces to make milkshakes
- Mix and crush ice in cocktails such as the Zombie, piña colada and frozen margarita
- Crush ice and other ingredients in non-alcoholic drinks such as frappuccinos and smoothies
- Emulsify mixtures
- Reduce small solids such as spices and seeds to smaller solids or completely powder or nut butter
- Blend mixtures of powders, granules, and/or liquids thoroughly
- Help dissolve solids into liquids

Blenders also have a variety of applications in microbiology and food science. In addition to standard food-type blenders, there are a variety of other configurations made for laboratories.

== Development ==
=== North America ===
The Polish-American chemist Stephen Poplawski, the owner of the Stevens Electric Company, began designing drink mixers in 1919 under a contract with Arnold Electric Company, and patented the drink mixer in 1922 which had been designed to make Horlicks malted milkshakes at soda fountains. He also introduced the liquefier blender in 1922.

In the 1930s, Louis Hamilton, Chester Beach and Fred Osius produced Poplawski's invention under the brand name Hamilton Beach Company. Fred Osius improved the appliance, making another kind of blender. He approached Fred Waring, a popular musician, who financed and promoted the "Miracle Mixer", released in 1933. However, the appliance had some problems to be solved about the seal of the jar and the knife axis, so Fred Waring redesigned the appliance and released his own blender in 1937, the Waring Blendor with which Waring popularized the smoothie in the 1940s. Waring Products was sold to Dynamics Corporation of America in 1957 and was acquired by Conair in 1998. Waring long used the trademarked spelling "Blendor" for its product; the trademark has expired.

Also in 1937, W.G. Barnard, founder of Vitamix, introduced a product called "The Blender," which was functionally a reinforced blender with a stainless steel jar, instead of the Pyrex glass jar used by Waring.

In 1946 John Oster, owner of the Oster barber equipment company, bought Stevens Electric Co. and designed its own blender, which Oster commercialized under the trademark Osterizer. Oster was bought by Sunbeam Products in 1960, in which it released various types of blenders, such as the Imperial series, and still make the traditional Osterizer blender.

=== Europe ===
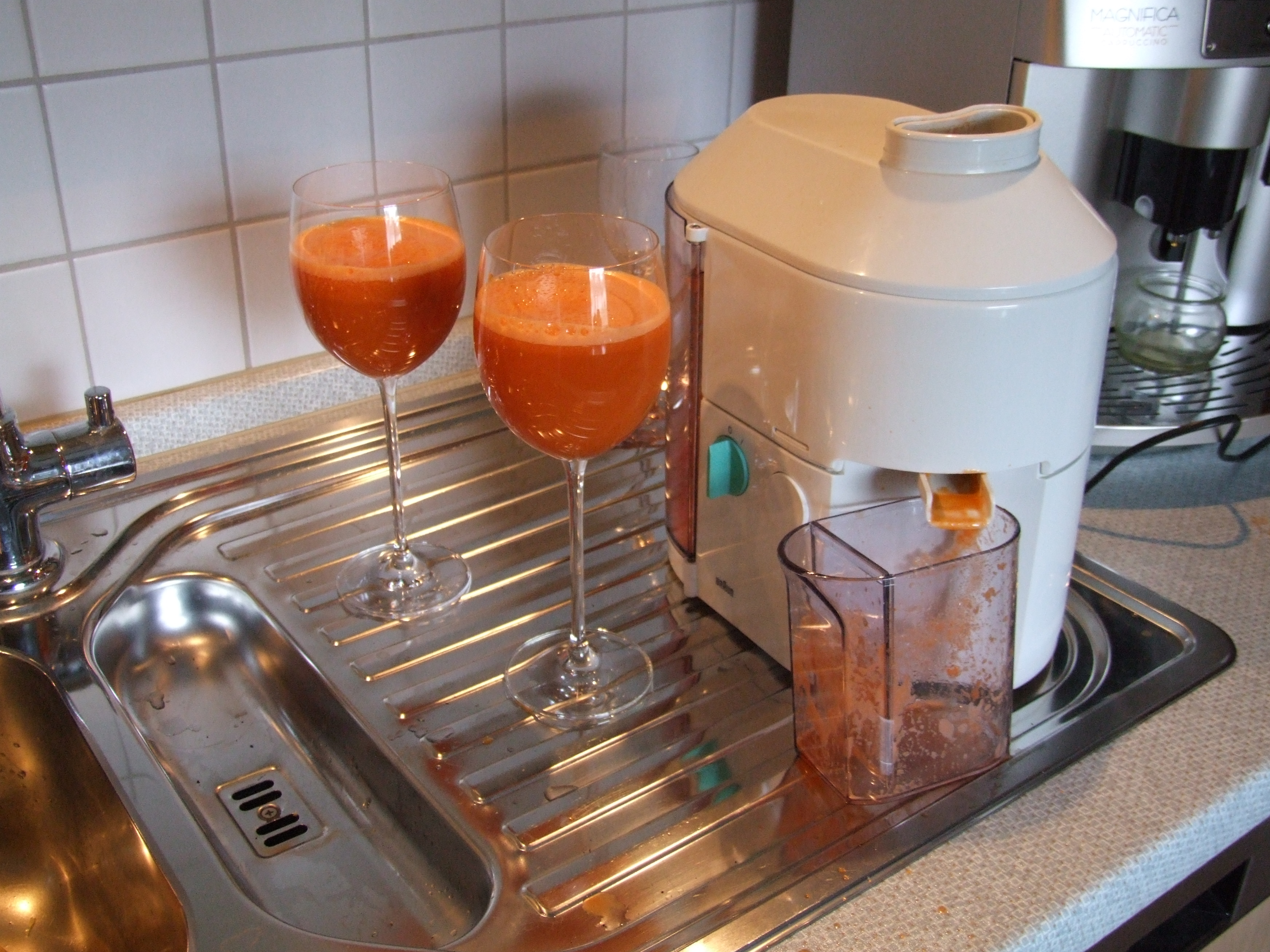
An electric centrifugal juicer

In Europe, the Swiss Traugott Oertli developed a blender based on the technical construction and design style conception of the first Waring Blendor (1937–1942), releasing in 1943 the Turmix Standmixer. Based on the blender, Traugott also developed another kind of appliance to extract juice of any juicy fruit or vegetables, the Turmix Juicer, which was also available as separated accessory for use in the Turmix blender, the juicer Turmix Junior. Turmix had promoted the benefits of drinking natural juices made with fruits and vegetables, with recipes using juices to promote its blender and juicer. After the World War II other companies released more blender in Europe; the first one was the popular Starmix Standmixer (1948), from the Germany company Electrostar, which had numerous accessories, like a coffee grinder, cake mixer, ice cream maker, food processor, thermic jar, milk centrifugue, juicer and meat grinder; and the Braun Multimix (1950) from Max Braun, which had an attachment with glass bowl to make batter bread and a juicer centrifuge like the one developed by Turmix.

=== South America ===
In Brazil, Waldemar Clemente, ex-staffer of General Electric and owner of Walita electric appliance company since 1939, designed a blender based on the Turmix Standmixer and released in 1944 the Walita Neutron blender. Clemente also created the name liquidificador, which ever since designated a blender in Brazil. Soon thereafter, Walita acquired the Turmix patents in Brazil and also released the Turmix juicer, calling it the Centrífuga Walita as well the others Turmix accessories for use with the blender motor, as fruit peelers, grinder, crusher and batter mixer. Using the same marketing strategy as Turmix in Europe, Walita passed the million-blenders-sold mark a few years later in the early 1950s. Walita was the first manufacturer to release a wide range of blenders in the 1940s. In the 1950s, Walita made blenders for Siemens, Turmix, Philips, and Sears (Kenmore), among others. In the 1960s Royal Philips Co. approached Walita, acquiring the company in 1971, becoming Royal Philips' kitchen appliances developer division specializing in blenders, which are sold under the Philips brand outside Brazil.

The Austrian immigrant Hanz Arno, owner of an electric motor manufacturer in Brazil since the 1940s, released a blender in 1947, based on the blenders made by Hamilton Beach and Oster. The Liquidificador Arno was exported to other South American countries. As Arno had stocks of Electrolux, that brand was used on the blender in some countries. Later in 1997 Arno was bought by the Groupe SEB, owner of Moulinex, T-Fal, Rowenta, and other home appliance brands.

=== Increased versatility ===
With the rising popularity of smoothies, Frappucinos and other frozen drinks prepared in front of the customer, new models of commercial blenders often include a sound-reducing enclosures and computerized controls.

Specialized blenders for making smoothies are becoming popular, chiefly resembling an ordinary model with a spigot added for quick serving. Some models also feature a gimballed stirring rod mounted on the lid, constructed so that mixtures can be stirred whilst the machine is running with no chance of the stirrer fouling the blades.

In 1996 Tom Dickson, founder and CEO of Blendtec, introduced the WildSide blending jar—a unique design that eliminated the need for stir sticks and plungers to make thicker blends. The technology was so effective that Vita-Mix decided to use the design in the company's commercial blending containers. In 2010 the United States court system concluded that Vita-Mix had willfully infringed the patents, ultimately awarding Blendtec $24 million in damages.

== Mechanical operation ==
A blender consists of a housing, motor, blades, and food container. A fan-cooled electric motor is secured into the housing by way of vibration dampers, and a small output shaft penetrates the upper housing and meshes with the blade assembly. Usually, a small rubber washer provides a seal around the output shaft to prevent liquid from entering the motor. Most blenders today have multiple speeds. As a typical blender has no gearbox, the multiple speeds are often implemented using a universal motor with multiple stator windings and/or multi-tapped stator windings; in a blender with electromechanical controls, the button (or other electrical switching device or position) for each different speed connects a different stator winding/tap or combination thereof. Each different combination of energized windings produces a different torque from the motor, which yields a different equilibrium speed in balance against the drag (resistance to rotation) of the blade assembly in contact with the material inside the food container. A notable exception from the mid-1960s is the Oster Model 412 Classic VIII (with the single knob) providing the lowest speed (Stir) using the aforementioned winding tap method but furnishing higher speeds (the continuously variable higher speed range is marked Puree to Liquify) by means of a mechanical speed governor that balances the force provided by flyweights against a spring force varied by the control knob when it is switched into the higher speed range.

== In culture ==
In 1949 the company Vitamix advertised their blender in one of the first television infomercials. The sales pitch lasted for 25 minutes, suggesting that the blender be used to make bread crumbs, potato pancakes, laxative spinach drinks, and a dessert beverage featuring entire raw eggs and their shells, which the host announced would be enjoyed like malted milk.

== See also ==
- Blade grinder
- Food processor
- Homogenization (chemistry)
- Homogenizer
- List of food preparation utensils
- Mixer (cooking)
- Will It Blend?
