= Vitamix =

American blender company

Vita-Mix Corporation
- Type: Private
- Industry: Small appliances
- Founded: 1921; 105 years ago
- Founder: William Barnard
- Headquarters: Olmsted Township, Ohio, United States
- Area served: Worldwide
- Key people: Steve Laserson (CEO); Greg Teed (president)
- Products: Blending equipment
- Number of employees: 726
- Website: www.vitamix.com

Vita-Mix Corporation, doing business as Vitamix, is an American company that manufactures and sells commercial and residential blenders. Vitamix was founded in 1921 by William Grover Barnard and is privately owned by the Barnard family. It has been based in Olmsted Falls since 1948. It employs more than 700 people, most at its Northeast Ohio headquarters and manufacturing facilities. Vitamix products are sold in over 130 countries.

== History ==
Vita-Mix Corporation was founded in 1921 by William Grover Barnard as the Barnard Sales Company. Barnard traveled the country selling can openers and other kitchen appliances. It was after helping a family member through an illness that Barnard became an advocate for whole food nutrition and refocused the company's emphasis on selling health foods and vitamins through the mail, which Barnard primarily promoted with live demonstrations. In 1937, Barnard saw a blender at a trade show and introduced his own model named the Vita-Mix to complement the health food products he sold. The name Vita-Mix comes from "vita", the Latin word for "life". That year, Barnard changed the name of the company to the Natural Food Institute and opened a storefront in Cleveland, Ohio. In 1948, the company moved to Olmsted Township.

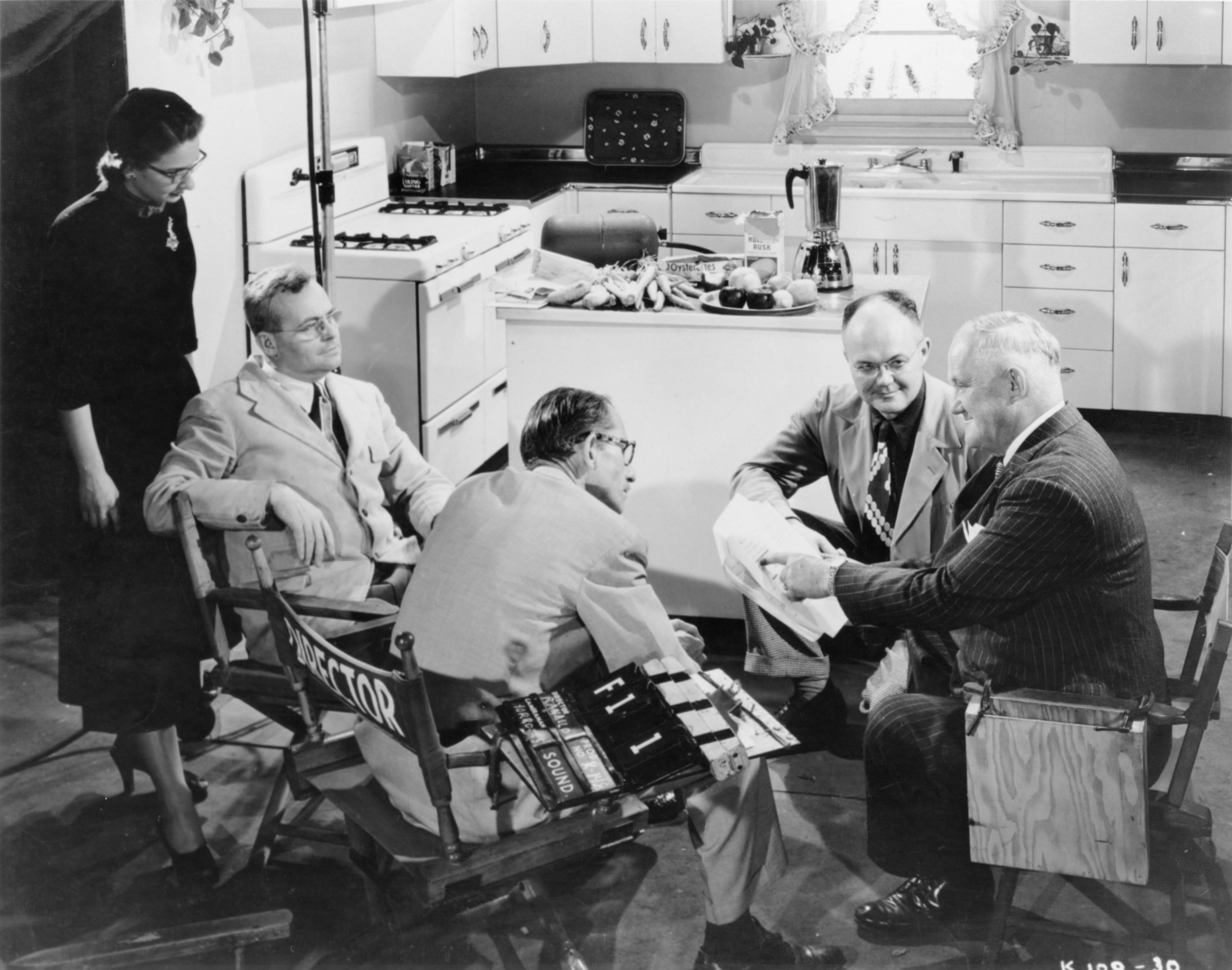
Photo taken during the filming of the first infomercial in 1949. William "Papa" Bernard is on the right. Ray Culley, the director from Cinécraft Productions, has his back to the camera. Image courtesy of Hagley Library Digital Archives.

In 1949, William Barnard's son, Bill, convinced his father to take his blender demonstrations to television, and Barnard purchased time on Cleveland's WEWS television station to demonstrate the Vita-Mix, making it the first company to broadcast an infomercial for a specific manufactured product. Barnard hired Cinécraft Productions, a Cleveland sponsored film studio, to produce the infomercial. It was a success and the company sold over 650 machines that night. The station repeated the infomercial weekly, and Barnard produced a series of demonstrations and broadcast them in other markets including New York City.

In 1955, Bill Barnard took over the company, which boosted sales with a cookbook written by his wife, Ruth. In 1962, Bill Barnard's son Grover joined the company and it discontinued selling health food products and shifted its focus to blenders. The company was renamed Vita-Mix Corporation in 1966. The company produced its last infomercials in the 1980s, which featured fitness personality Richard Simmons.

In February 2006, Blendtec sued Vita-Mix Corporation for infringing on its patents on its "Wild Side" jar design, which Vita-Mix had allegedly copied for its containers. The court concluded Vita-Mix had infringed Blendtec's patents, and awarded Blendtec total damages of approximately $24 million, the largest patent-related penalty in the history of Utah. In 2009, Jodi Berg, a great-granddaughter of founder William Grover Barnard, became the president of Vita-Mix, making her the fourth generation member of the Barnard family to hold the title. She became CEO in 2011. In 2010, the company introduced a new logo resembling a blender vortex and restyled its trade name as Vitamix. Under Berg, the company expanded its marking efforts and retail presence, selling 1.4 million blenders in 2013, a 52% year over year increase.

Vitamix primarily markets its blenders using live demonstrations, and as of 2013 employed over 500 representatives to show its products at culinary festivals, grocery stores, wholesales clubs and conventions. Vitamix's corporate clients include Starbucks, McDonald's, and Jamba Juice (Jamba Juice switched to competitor Blendtec in 2015). Vitamix donates blenders to the Culinary Institute of America to develop relationships with chefs. In 2013, the company opened a 175,000 sq. foot manufacturing facility outside of Cleveland.

In 2022, Steve Laserson became CEO, becoming the first non-family member to lead the company.

== Products ==
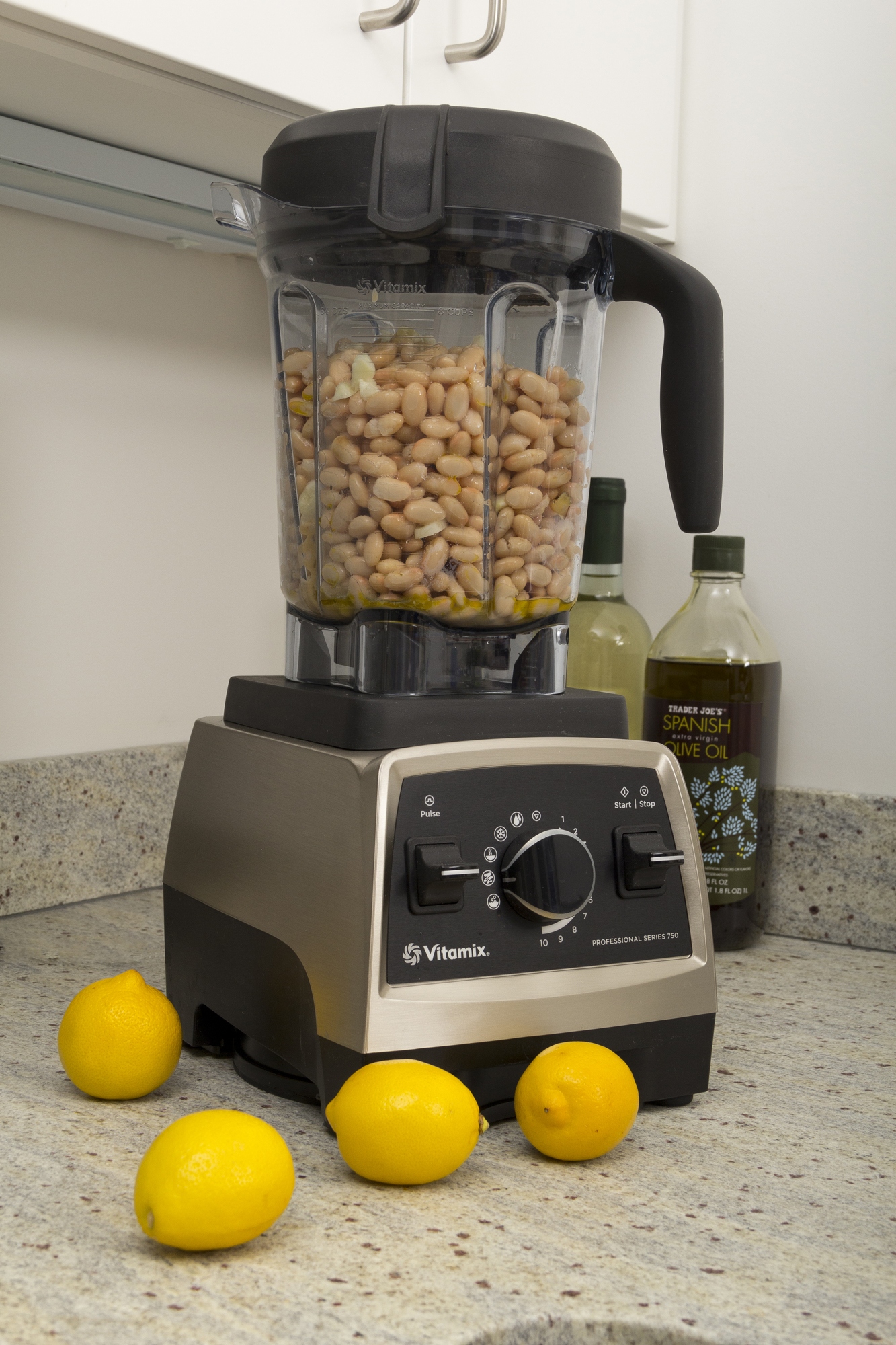
A Vitamix blender on a countertop.

The company's first blender, the Vita-Mix, was introduced in 1937 and sold at an $11.95 base price. It used stainless steel containers. At the time of the company's first 1949 infomercial, the Vita-Mix sold for $34.95 and had an optional glass container. In 1950, the Vita-Mix Mark 20 blender was introduced, which featured variable speeds.

In 1970, the Vita-Mix 3600 was introduced, which featured a more powerful motor originally designed for circular saws to handle tasks such as turning wheat into flour and peanuts into peanut butter. It also included more durable stainless steel blades and containers, and a spout at the bottom of the container was added. In 1988, the Vita-Mix 4000, a commercial variant of the 3600 blender, was introduced.

In 1992, the Vita-Mix 5000, also known as the Total Nutrition Center, was introduced. It was the company's first blender to use a boxier plastic base and a clear polycarbonate container, and included an 11 speed motor. A 1995 revision added a timer.

The Vitamix 7500, introduced in 2012, was the company's first blender to feature a microprocessor that allowed it to use a ramp-up speed dial. It also features a more powerful motor to work with redesigned lower-profile containers with larger 4-inch blades; Vitamix's older blenders do not have motors capable of running the larger blades and are incompatible. In 2014, the S-series blenders were introduced, which use a compact base and screw-on containers and personal cups, but were criticized for being less powerful than the company's full-sized blenders and having smaller containers but only costing slightly less.

In 2016, the Ascent series was introduced, its first "Smart System" blenders that feature Bluetooth to connect to accessories and NFC to detect containers. Smart System blenders are incompatible with older containers that lack an NFC chip and the base will not operate with them. In 2020, Vitamix introduced a food processor attachment for its NFC-equipped blenders. In 2021, the Vitamix One, a lower-cost compact blender, was introduced.

Over 100,000 containers sold in 2017 and 2018 were recalled. Fast Company headlined, "Vitamix recall: Your $500 blender might hurt you."

As of 2023, Vitamix's full-sized blenders range in price from $350 to $650. Vitamix's pricing has sometimes been criticized as excessive, and has been parodied on Saturday Night Live. Vitamix blenders have consistently been top-performers for performance and durability in testing conducted by reviewers such as The New York Times, Consumer Reports, Good Housekeeping, and America's Test Kitchen.

=== Non-blender products ===
In the 1970s and 1980s, Vita-Mix experimented with selling fitness equipment and juicers. In 1985, the company introduced the Flurry (later renamed the Mix'n Machine), a commercial ice cream and frozen concoction maker. The company also sold a vacuum cleaner, the Vita-Vac, until the early 2000s.

In 2021, the company sold the FoodCycler, a rebadged home composter manufactured by Canadian-based Food Cycle Science.

== Community involvement ==
In 2019, Vitamix entered into a $200,000 partnership with Olmsted Falls City Schools, an Ohio "Triple A" public school district located in Olmsted Falls, Ohio, where the company is headquartered. The sponsorship deal includes naming rights to the district's high school football field, student curriculum enhancements, and food services support.

== Early Vita-Mix TV Infomercials ==
- Healthy Living Is Fun (1950) 5-minute, black and white filmed infomercial. Sponsor: Natural Foods Institute. Features "Papa" Barnard, the founder of the Natural Foods Institute (later known as Vita-Mix)
- Health: Yours for the Asking (1950) 15-minute, black and white filmed infomercial. Sponsor: Natural Foods Institute. Features "Papa" Barnard, the founder of the Natural Foods Institute (later known as Vita-Mix)
- Eat Your Way to Health (1950) 15-minute, black and white filmed infomercial. Sponsor: Natural Foods Institute. Features "Papa" Barnard, the founder of the Natural Foods Institute (later known as Vita-Mix)
- Wheel 'O Life (1950) 1-minute, black and white filmed commercial for Wheel 'O Life, a wheel chart listing various foods and their nutritional value and calories
