= Social software (research field) =

Interdisciplinary research program

In philosophy and the social sciences, social software is an interdisciplinary research program that borrows mathematical tools and techniques from game theory and computer science in order to analyze and design social procedures. The goals of research in this field are modeling social situations, developing theories of correctness, and designing social procedures.

Work under the term social software has been going on since about 1996, and conferences in Copenhagen, London, Utrecht and New York, have been partly or wholly devoted to it. Much of the work is carried out at the City University of New York under the leadership of Rohit Jivanlal Parikh, who was influential in the development of the field.

== Goals and tools ==
Current research in the area of social software include the analysis of social procedures and examination of them for fairness, appropriateness, correctness and efficiency. For example, an election procedure could be a simple majority vote, Borda count, a Single Transferable vote (STV), or Approval voting. All of these procedures can be examined for various properties like monotonicity. Monotonicity has the property that voting for a candidate should not harm that candidate. This may seem obvious, true under any system, but it is something which can happen in STV. Another question would be the ability to elect a Condorcet winner in case there is one.

Other principles which are considered by researchers in social software include the concept that a procedure for fair division should be Pareto optimal, equitable and envy free. A procedure for auctions should be one which would encourage bidders to bid their actual valuation – a property which holds with the Vickrey auction.

What is new in social software compared to older fields is the use of tools from computer science like program logic, analysis of algorithms and epistemic logic. Like programs, social procedures dovetail into each other. For instance an airport provides runways for planes to land, but it also provides security checks, and it must provide for ways in which buses and taxis can take arriving passengers to their local destinations. The entire mechanism can be analyzed in the way in which a complex computer program can be analyzed. The Banach-Knaster procedure for dividing a cake fairly, or the Brams and Taylor procedure for fair division have been analyzed in this way. To point to the need for epistemic logic, a building not only needs restrooms, for obvious reasons, it also needs signs indicating where they are. Thus epistemic considerations enter in addition to structural ones. For a more urgent example, in addition to medicines, physicians also need tests to indicate what a patient's problem is.

== See also ==
- Dynamic logic
- Epistemic logic
- Fair division
- Game theory
- Mechanism design
- No-trade theorem
- Social procedure
- Social technology
