= Enterprise social networking =

Business use of social network systems

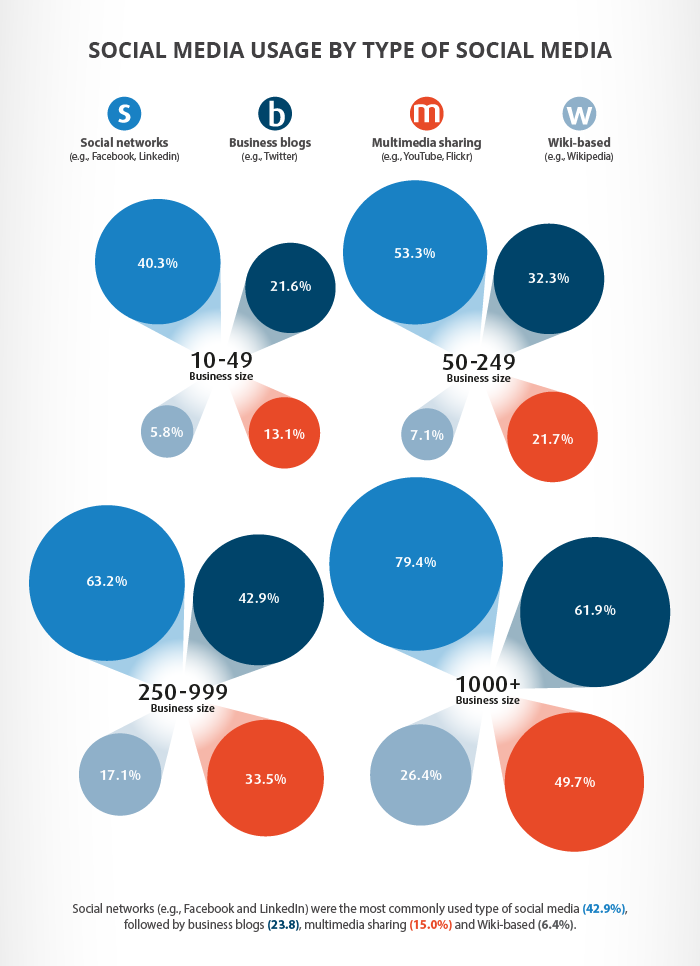
Business use of social media in the UK (2012).

Enterprise social networking focuses on the use of online social networks or social relations among people who share business interests and/or activities. Enterprise social networking is often a facility of enterprise social software (regarded as a primary component of Enterprise 2.0), which is essentially social software used in "enterprise" (business/commercial) contexts. It encompasses modifications to corporate intranets (referred to as social intranets) and other classic software platforms used by large companies to organize their communication, collaboration and other aspects of their intranets. Enterprise social networking is also generally thought to include the use of a standard external social networking service to generate visibility for an enterprise.

== History ==
Social networking sites started to form in the 1990s; an example of these websites is Theglobe.com, which began in 1995. As other websites such as GeoCities and Tripod.com started to form online communities, they encouraged their users to interact with each other via chat rooms and other tools. They also provided easy-to-use publishing tools along with free web space. Classmates.com’s approach was to link people together via their emails, the website was like a friends search engine.

Businesses eventually realized that social networking websites could provide a fast and efficient way of marketing. Social media websites are great places for businesses to reach their customers, and the environment can provide a means for growing a business. In 2005, as social networking websites were becoming more and more popular, Myspace had more page views than Google. Myspace was followed by Facebook which started in February 2004. When Facebook began, users were limited to college students in the United States, who had to use a college email with a .edu extension to join the network. In September 2005 some high schools were allowed to join the network, but they needed an invitation to join. On September 26 of 2006, Facebook announced that anyone around the world older than 13 years old with a valid email would be able to join Facebook’s online community. In October 2007, Microsoft purchased a 1.6% share of Facebook. That gave them the right to place international ads on Facebook. In July 2010 it was reported that Facebook had more than 500 million active users. This means that one out of fourteen people around the world is a Facebook user. The growth of Facebook was a boom in the social networking space. Facebook became a huge corporation that had 1400 employees in 2009; their estimated revenue was US$800 million in 2009. In 2010, it was reported that there were more than 200 social networking websites on the web.

== Business impacts ==
Companies such as Jive Software and IBM have recently been doing research to see how social networking can impact enterprise networks. Different companies have embraced social networking and they are creating their own internal social networking sites. IBM is one example and they have created the Beehive research project, based on their Lotus Connections product. Another example is Atos, which is deploying its in-house blueKiwi product across all 76,000 employees to achieve its Zero Email ambition by the end of 2013. Many companies are encouraging employees to use their social networks so they can connect with other employees, help people socialize when they take a break, or even help contribute to other work-related issues. Some companies are even joining typical social networking sites like Facebook or MySpace to gain more clients, communicate with their clients, or target individuals based on their likes. These companies want to gain the trust of their clients.

== Applications ==
The year 2009 saw 92% of Inc. 500 companies using at least one social media channel, a dramatic increase over the 77% reported in 2008.

Medpedia is one of about 70 medical wikis that allows physicians and researchers to share information. While the information is free and publicly available, contributions are limited to those provided by medical professionals.

Intellipedia is a set of three wikis used by the US intelligence community to share information of varying classifications.

Deloitte has been a pioneer in its use of the corporate social networking applications for consulting.

Boral Limited was one of the first major building and construction materials companies in Australia to adopt Enterprise Social Networking using the Yammer platform. Engagement levels of over 25% were achieved. Other notable uses include Lockheed Martin and Pfizer as documented by the Queensland University of Technology (QUT).

The adoption of social networking in sales organizations has recently been given a new name, S2.0 or Sales 2.0. Implementing a private sales social network provides a means to quickly disburse company sales knowledge.

Smart companies are using social media tools to outsource their work to their customers. In addition to using social networking to market the enterprise, companies are involving customers in the design process. Chicago company Threadless invites their customers to submit their T-shirt designs to the Threadless web site for review by other customers. Smart companies are also involving their customers in technical support using enterprise social networking. eBay was an early adopter of the practice of allowing users to assist each other online.

== Issues ==
=== Lack of adoption ===
If training in the use of enterprise social networking tools is not provided to employees who do not have experience using them, they are unlikely to be widely adopted. The use of enterprise social networking must be championed at the highest levels of the enterprise to provide the resources needed and promote adoption throughout the organization. Gartner have said that only 10% of organisations see value in a social collaboration product, primarily due to the lack of change management provided during rollout.

The lack of adoption is a complex issue with many theories put forward:

=== Transparency ===
The sharing of information across the enterprise through social networking creates a transparency that may or may not necessarily be welcomed by all sectors of the organization.

=== Perception ===
There is often an assumption that social networking will not work well in a particular industry or that its use may be perceived as unprofessional. In addition the ability to justify use of enterprise social networking, based on return on investment is not always readily apparent.

Members of traditional or conservative organisations perceive social networking as a time wasting tool. However once employees see usage by other employees, they often begin seeing the value and hence engaging and contributing content.

=== Privacy and security ===
Privacy issues associated with social networking sites can be seen from many perspectives. Some people will argue that this is just a part of globalization and the growth of technology, while others will still believe that it is a right for any citizen, and will never change their views and perspectives about their privacy. With the increase in popularity of social networking, many users have given up their personal privacy in order to join these networks. Social media privacy issues didn’t begin with social networking sites; they have historically been persistent issues with many other types of social media such as text messaging, instant messaging and computer-supported collaboration work.

Oscar Gandy in 1993 claimed that in the age of digital media, people probably do not have any privacy. He stated that “the panoptic sort is an antidemocratic system of control that cannot be transformed because it can serve no purpose other than that for which it was designed — the rationalization and control of human existence.” Gandy demanded creation of an agency that would ensure the survival of privacy.

From a policy perspective, according to Schement and Curtis (1994), privacy is seen “as security against intrusion by government”. According to Garfinkel (2000) “Privacy isn’t just about hiding things. It’s about self–possession, autonomy, and integrity.”

Because social tools make many things that were normally private much more public, including all types of corporate data, many organizations would rather wait for best practices or to see what their peers are doing before delving very far into social networking. Privacy can become a huge issue at the enterprise level, when customer and employee data are at stake. Security concerns must be addressed prior to embarking upon creation of an enterprise social network.

=== Behavioral issues ===
One of the significant areas of concern with the use of social networking internally within organisations is the impact and effect of behavioral issues. As the interactions within a social network are loosely coupled to business process and structured information systems, the effect of individual personalities and human psychology become more pronounced within social networks. Such emerging concerns cover issues such as attention management, death by trivia, dominant personalities, behavioral adoption and influence strategies.

== See also ==
- Corporate social media
- Enterprise social software
- Social media use by businesses
