= Blendtec =

American blender company

Blendtec Inc.

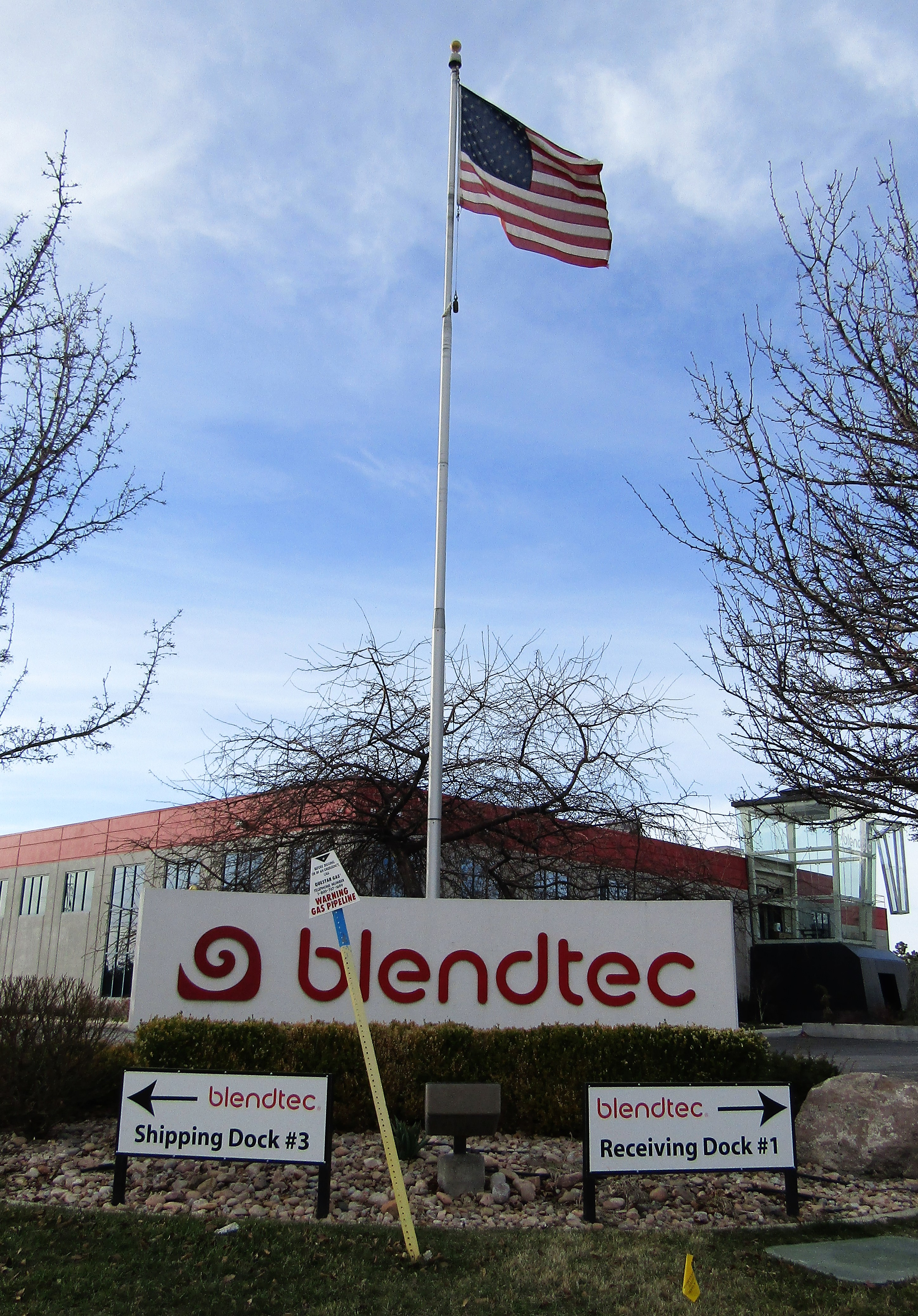
- Type: Division
- Industry: Consumer goods
- Founded: 1975; 51 years ago
- Founder: Tom Dickson
- Headquarters: Orem, Utah, United States
- Area served: Worldwide
- Key people: Tom Dickson, ex-CEO
- Products: Commercial and residential blenders and blending machines
- Parent: Wasatch Group.
- Website: www.blendtec.com

Blendtec is an American company that sells commercial and residential blenders. It is a division of K-TEC, Inc. Blendtec was founded in 1975 by Tom Dickson, and as of 2025 still operates primarily from Orem, Utah, United States.

== Marketing ==
Blendtec is popularly known for its Will It Blend? viral marketing campaign, where Dickson blends various non-food items, including iPods, iPhones, marbles, golf balls, and remote controls. Dickson was featured in "How I Made My Millions", a CNBC series covering individuals who founded and grew successful businesses.

== History ==
In February 2006, Blendtec sued Vitamix Corporation for infringing its patents on Blendtec's "Wild Side" jar design, which Vitamix had allegedly copied as its own MP and XP containers. The court concluded Vitamix had infringed Blendtec's patents, and awarded Blendtec total damages of approximately $24 million, the largest patent-related penalty in the history of Utah.

In July 2013, Blendtec won the 2013 Gold Innovation Award for innovations delivered by Blendtec's Signature Series and Stealth lines of blenders.

In 2015, Blendtec replaced Vitamix as the blender supplier of Jamba Juice.

In June 2017, the company was awarded the 2017 Kitchen Innovations Award for its Nitro Blending System.

Blendtec is the parent company of the nutrition company Blendfresh, which was launched on July 14, 2014.

In 2021, the Blendtec founding family sold majority share of the company to Wasatch Group.

== Products ==
Home blenders

- Classic 575
- Designer 650
- Designer 650 S
- Professional 800
- Total Blender Classic

Commercial blenders

- Connoisseur 825 Spacesaver
- Connoisseur 825
- Stealth
- Stealth Nitro
- Stealth X
- Stealth Nitro X

Commercial dispensers & self serve machines

- BDI
- BI
- BD8
- D8
- RealSmooth

Jars

- WildSide+ Jar
- Wildside Flow Jar
- Mini WildSide Jar
- FourSide Jar
- Twister Jar
- Margarita Jar
- Blendtec GO

== See also ==
- Will It Blend?
