= Will It Blend? =

2006 marketing webseries

- Genre: Viral marketing, paid programming
- Created by: George Wright; Tom Dickson; Kels Goodman
- Written by: Kels Goodman; Bruce Carlson
- Starring: Tom Dickson
- Country of origin: United States
- Original language: English

Production
- Producer: Kels Goodman
- Production location: Utah
- Camera setup: Kels Goodman

Original release
- Network: YouTube
- Release: October 30, 2006 – November 10, 2020

Will It Blend? is a viral marketing campaign web series consisting of infomercials that showed demonstrations of the Blendtec line of blenders (particularly the Total Blender). In the show, Blendtec founder Tom Dickson attempts to blend items to demonstrate the power of his blender. Dickson started this marketing campaign after doing a blending experiment with a box of matches. The final video was made in 2020, shortly before the sale of the company to Wasatch Group.

== Premise ==
Each episode of the show started with Tom Dickson introducing it with the phrase "Will it blend? That is the question." followed by the title sequence. He then briefly introduced the item being blended before placing it into the blender and starting it. The item in question was blended, often with slow-motion replays. Dickson then took the item out of the blender and commented on its condition, followed by an on-screen caption of (usually) "Yes, it blends!".

One of the most famous Will it Blend? creations was the "cochicken" or "cochiken", which is half of a chicken (cooked, usually rotisserie) blended with 12 fluid ounces of Coca-Cola. Although the show's example was blended with the bones (and thus was disclaimed as unsafe to eat), a boneless version was made on NBC's Today and served to Meredith Vieira.

In an episode released on April 3, 2007, Dickson placed a camcorder in the blender while it was operating. Shortly afterward, the production team, Kels Goodman and Ray Hansen, attempted to return what was left of the camcorder to Best Buy, with no success.

Other technological devices were blended, such as on the April 5, 2010, episode, an iPad was blended after being smashed to fit into the blender. The number of views this video received prompted Dickson to set up a contest on blendtec.com to give away either the shredded or the boxed iPad. At the time, each prize came with a free Blendtec Total Blender. On the June 25, 2010, episode, an iPhone 4 was blended.

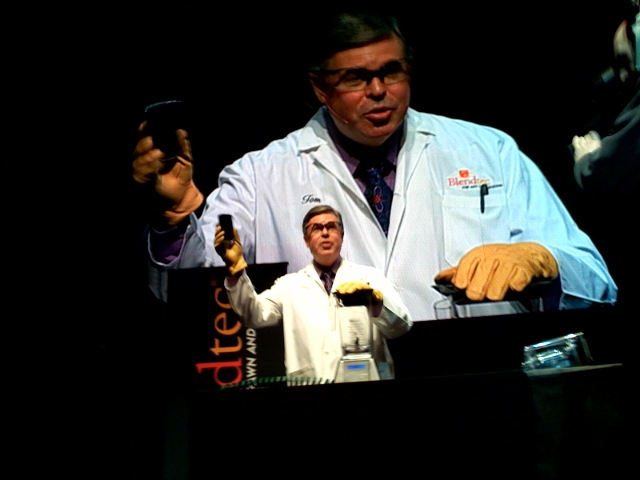
Tom Dickson blending at YouTube Live

Some episodes were produced to coincide with certain events. For example, three episodes aired during the weekend of Super Bowl XLI. Because of trademark restrictions, the words "Super Bowl" were substituted with words such as "Super Sunday", "The Big Game", or "That Last Football Game". The first episode had Dickson blend a smoothie out of salsa, tortilla chips, Buffalo wings, and some Budweiser. The second and third episodes used two blenders to predict the outcome of the Super Bowl by blending miniature helmets (AFC vs. NFC) and foam footballs (Indianapolis Colts vs. Chicago Bears). To coincide with the release of the film Transformers, Dickson blended toys of the Transformers characters Bumblebee and Swindle before challenging two of his grandchildren to transform the remains. When Dickson learned that The Beach Boys did not win Esquire's 2007 Esky Award, he blended the trophy.

== Cultural impact and legacy ==
Blendtec formerly sold Will It Blend? merchandise, including a shirt with the slogan "Tom Dickson is my Homeboy".

Dickson made television appearances on NBC's The Tonight Show with Jay Leno on March 30, 2007, on which he blended a rake handle in seconds. The original videos were used on The CW series Online Nation. Dickson also made his appearance in the History Channel series Modern Marvels. In the episode World's Strongest III that was aired on March 6, 2008, Dickson blended portable MP3 players that contain the channel's longest-running series. In April 2007, radio station KDRF (eD-FM) in Albuquerque, New Mexico, enlisted Dickson to do a Will It Blend? promotion for the radio station. The three 30-second commercials show different styles of music (CDs) being blended to promote the station's variety format.

In September 2007, his videos earned the second-highest annual payout of his of about US$15,000 from the video hosting service Revver.

In 2008, Will It Blend? was featured in a Dreyer's/Edy's Dibs commercial. In the commercial, a girl holding a large lollipop tries some Dibs and wonders what will happen to lollipops when kids stop buying them in favor of the bite-sized ice cream treats. The next scene shows giant lollipops, used as alternatives to waxing a man's hairy back before Dickson blends them. In a second version of the commercial, Dickson himself was waxed.

Will It Blend? was nominated for the 2007 YouTube Award for Best Series. It won Net's 2007 Viral Video Campaign of the Year and the bronze-level Clio Award for Viral Video in 2008.

The iPhone episode of Will It Blend? won Ad of the Week in episode 8 of the Australian show The Gruen Transfer.

== See also ==
- Blendtec
- Hydraulic Press Channel
- Will It Float?
- Will It Break?
- How Much is Inside?
- YouTube
