= Social media use by businesses =

Social media use by businesses includes a range of applications. Although social media accessed via desktop computers offer an online shopping variety of opportunities for companies in a wide range of business sectors, mobile social media, which users can access when they are "on the go" via tablet computers or smartphones, benefit companies because of the location- and time-sensitive awareness of their users. Mobile social media tools can be used for marketing research, communication, sales promotions/discounts, informal employee learning/organizational development, relationship development/loyalty programs, and e-commerce.

- Marketing research: Mobile social media applications provide companies data about offline consumer movements at a level of detail that was previously accessible to online companies only. These applications allow any business to know the exact time a customer who uses social media entered one of its locations, as well as know the social media comments made during the visit.
- Communication: Mobile social media communication takes two forms: company-to-consumer (in which a company may establish a connection to a consumer based on its location and provide reviews about locations nearby) and user-generated content. For example, McDonald's offered $5 and $10 gift-cards to 100 users randomly selected among those checking in at one of its restaurants. This promotion increased check-ins by 33% (from 2,146 to 2,865), resulted in over 50 articles and blog posts, and prompted several hundred thousand news feeds and Twitter messages.
- Sales promotions and discounts: Although customers have had to use printed coupons in the past, mobile social media allows companies to tailor promotions to specific users at specific times. For example, when launching its California-Cancun service, Virgin America offered users who checked in through Loopt at one of three designated taco trucks in San Francisco or Los Angeles between 11 a.m. and 3 p.m. on 31 August 2010, two tacos for $1 and two flights to Cancun or Cabo for the price of one. This special promotion was only available to people who were at a certain location at a certain time.
- Relationship development and loyalty programs: In order to increase long-term relationships with customers, companies can develop loyalty programs that allow customers who check-in via social media regularly at a location to earn discounts or perks. For example, American Eagle Outfitters remunerates such customers with a tiered 10%, 15%, or 20% discount on their total purchase.
- Informal employee learning/organizational development is facilitated by social media. Technologies such as blogs, wiki pages, web forums, social networks and other social media act as technology enhanced learning (TEL) tools, and their users perceive change in organizational structure, culture and knowledge management. The prerequisite for the successful use of social media are motivated employees who want to use the new technologies. It is central for companies to understand the factors that determine the willingness to use social media.
- Customer service and support: A company can gain cost savings and increase revenue and customer satisfaction by using social media platforms in customer service and support. By using social media tools, company's have easy and widescale contact to its customers and simultaneously increase their brand knowledge.
- E-commerce: Social media sites are increasingly implementing marketing-friendly strategies, creating platforms that are mutually beneficial for users, businesses, and the networks themselves in the popularity and accessibility of e-commerce, or online purchases. The user who posts their comments about a company's product or service benefits because they are able to share their views with their online friends and acquaintances. The company benefits because it obtains insight (positive or negative) about how their product or service is viewed by consumers. Mobile social media applications such as Amazon.com and Pinterest have started to influence an upward trend in the popularity and accessibility of e-commerce.

E-commerce businesses may refer to social media as consumer-generated media (CGM). A common thread running through all definitions of social media is a blending of technology and social interaction for the co-creation of value for the business or organization that is using it. People obtain valuable information, education, news, and other data from electronic and print media. Social media are distinct from industrial and traditional media such as newspapers, magazines, television, and film as they are comparatively inexpensive marketing tools and are highly accessible. They enable anyone, including private individuals, to publish or access information easily. Industrial media generally require significant resources to publish information, and in most cases the articles go through many revisions before being published. This process adds to the cost and the resulting market price. Originally social media was only used by individuals, but now it is used by both businesses and nonprofit organizations and also in government and politics.

One characteristic shared by both social and industrial media is the capability to reach small or large audiences; for example, either a blog post or a television show may reach no people or millions of people. Some of the properties that help describe the differences between social and industrial media are:

1. Quality: In industrial (traditional) publishing—mediated by a publisher—the typical range of quality is substantially narrower (skewing to the high quality side) than in niche, unmediated markets like user-generated social media posts. The main challenge posed by the content in social media sites is the fact that the distribution of quality has high variance: from very high-quality items to low-quality, sometimes even abusive or inappropriate content.
2. Reach: Both industrial and social media technologies provide scale and are capable of reaching a global audience. Industrial media, however, typically use a centralized framework for organization, production, and dissemination, whereas social media are by their very nature more decentralized, less hierarchical, and distinguished by multiple points of production and utility.
3. Frequency: The number of times users access a type of media per day. Heavy social media users, such as young people, check their social media account numerous times throughout the day.
4. Accessibility: The means of production for industrial media are typically government or corporate (privately owned); social media tools are generally available to the public at little or no cost, or they are supported by advertising revenue. While social media tools are available to anyone with access to Internet and a computer or mobile device, due to the digital divide, the poorest segment of the population lacks access to the Internet and computer. Low-income people may have more access to traditional media (TV, radio, etc.), as an inexpensive TV and aerial or radio costs much less than an inexpensive computer or mobile device. Moreover, in many regions, TV or radio owners can tune into free over the air programming; computer or mobile device owners need Internet access to go to social media sites.
5. Usability: Industrial media production typically requires specialized skills and training. For example, in the 1970s, to record a pop song, an aspiring singer would have to rent time in an expensive professional recording studio and hire an audio engineer. Conversely, most social media activities, such as posting a video of oneself singing a song require only modest reinterpretation of existing skills (assuming a person understands Web 2.0 technologies); in theory, anyone with access to the Internet can operate the means of social media production, and post digital pictures, videos or text online.
6. Immediacy: The time lag between communications produced by industrial media can be long (days, weeks, or even months, by the time the content has been reviewed by various editors and fact checkers) compared to social media (which can be capable of virtually instantaneous responses). The immediacy of social media can be seen as a strength, in that it enables regular people to instantly communicate their opinions and information. At the same time, the immediacy of social media can also be seen as a weakness, as the lack of fact checking and editorial "gatekeepers" facilitates the circulation of hoaxes and fake news.
7. Permanence: Industrial media, once created, cannot be altered (e.g., once a magazine article or paper book is printed and distributed, changes cannot be made to that same article in that print run) whereas social media posts can be altered almost instantaneously, when the user decides to edit their post or due to comments from other readers.

Community media constitute a hybrid of industrial and social media. Though community-owned, some community radio, TV, and newspapers are run by professionals and some by amateurs. They use both social and industrial media frameworks. Social media has also been recognized for the way they have changed how public relations professionals conduct their jobs. They have provided an open arena where people are free to exchange ideas on companies, brands, and products. Doc Searls and David Wagner state that the "...best of the people in PR are not PR types at all. They understand that there aren't censors, they're the company's best conversationalists." Social media provides an environment where users and PR professionals can converse, and where PR professionals can promote their brand and improve their company's image by listening and responding to what the public is saying about their product.

== Impact of the Internet on business landscapes ==
The increased use of the internet has had significant impact upon the competitive structures of the United States economy by differentially impacting small and large businesses. Studies indicate that the primary benefits of access to the internet for small businesses are the direct and indirect network effects, lower search costs and price dispersions. The primary drawbacks are limited interaction with consumers and increased expenditures.

The TOE framework lets companies evaluate the impact and value of social media on their business model and practices. TOE stands for technology, organization, and environment, and within it are several components. Technology is specifically 'Technology Competence,' Organization is 'Customer Pressure,' and Environment is a combination of 'Competitive Pressure' and 'Mobile Environment.' All of these aspects influence social media use by small businesses, and must be considered before jumping into social media utilization. They should generate value through perceived impact on internal operations, perceived impact on marketing, perceived impact on customer service, and perceived impact on sales.

There are multiple reasons to encourage more competition through small businesses. In particular, small businesses allow for more consumer benefits which can result in more egalitarian distributions of income, creation of more jobs and an expanded middle class.

According to the research by McKinsey Global Institute, the internet has become the driving force behind GDP growth in developed economies over the past 5 years, accounting for a 21 percent increase in GDP. The internet is considered a two sided market with indirect and direct network effects. Direct network effects are described as the utility of a service increasing as the number of users increases. Indirect network demand for two or more users. They are defined when the value of one client group increases as another user based group joins the application.

Smaller businesses thrive with indirect network effects because they encourage more buyers and sellers. The increased numbers of participant on one side of an online business leads to an increase on the other market side. Direct network effects, on the other hand, are related to the size of the user base and thus favor large companies. For example, authors Haucap and Heimeshoff studies on internet-based dominant services demonstrate that in the case of telecommunication networks like Skype, Facebook and LinkedIn, the utility that consumers derive depend on the presence of other users.

One industry that the access to the internet has affected is the newspaper industry. The news industry is in competition with the online news media more broadly. According to the authors, Jeon and Nasr discussion, 57 percent of newspaper readers now turn to digital sources for their news information. Although this study states that the presence of the internet has negatively impacted the newspaper industry, it also demonstrates how small businesses have undermined large news monopolies. Because large businesses gather their news information from smaller news companies, it allows readers of these articles to navigate to these small companies websites. This creates more consumer interaction and ambition for high quality news for smaller businesses.

Search costs are defined as the costs of looking for information. It is easier to discover and compare information through the internet. Lower search costs allow consumers to gather a range of prices for the specific product. This reduces price dispersion. The internet supports consumer spending by providing different retailers who produce a variety of products and a variety of price dispersion. These show that lower search costs support a more competitive structure because it is easier to find unique and rare products through the increase of firms presence on the internet.

The drawbacks for small businesses include limited interaction between business and consumer and very high expenditures. The New York Times writes an article about a grocery retailer, "Holiday Market", that is labeled as a small business in Detroit. The stores revenue has increased by 20 percent because of the addition of online shopping for customers. However, although profit was booming there were still some logistical challenges for this small grocery retailer to have a presence online. One challenge was the expenses. The owner describes how expensive it was to create space inside his store to keep his online orders cold and fresh. He even had to hire more employees to shop in-store for the online orders because of the increasing demand from customers online.

== Performance benefits ==
There are six channels by which social media resources can transform into business performance capabilities:

1. Social capital represents the extent to which social media affects firms' and organizations' relationships with society and the degree to which the organizations' use of social media increases corporate social-performance capabilities.
2. Revealed preferences represent the extent to which social media exposes customers' likings (e.g., "likes" and followers) and increase a firm's financial capabilities (e.g., stock price, revenue, profit), or for non-profits, increases their donations, volunteerism rate, etc.
3. Social marketing represents the extent to which social-marketing resources (e.g., online conversations, sharing links, online presence, sending text-messages) are used to increase a firm's financial capabilities (e.g., sales, acquisition of new customers) or a non-profit's voluntary sector goals.
4. Social corporate networking involves the informal ties and linkages of corporate/organizational staff with other people from their field or industry, clients, customers, and other members of the public, which form through social networks. Social corporate networking can increase operational performance capabilities in many ways, as it can enable sales staff to find new clients; help marketing staff to learn about client/customer needs and demand, and teach management about the public perceptions of their strategy or approach.
5. Influence on consumer decisions With the ever-increasing technological development of social media, this has affected consumers' decision to buy the product or service provided by companies. On the other hand, social media has become an important factor in increasing the sales of brands, whether large or small, since the beginning of the Internet revolution. There is much research to prove this, based on the actions taken by the consumer through 2017. There will be many reports at the beginning 2018 confirming the degree to which social media has become effective in marketing companies and the importance of focusing on them.
6. Increase website traffic. One of the benefits of social media is driving traffic to the website. If the account consists of content from the website, it will help to increase page views. The existence of the link to the website helps the audience learns more about the brand.

There are four tools or approaches that engage experts, customers, suppliers, and employees in the development of products and services using social media. Companies and other organizations can use these tools and approaches to improve their business capacity and performance.

1. Customer relationship management (CRM) is an approach to managing a company's interaction with current and potential future customers that try to analyze data about customers' history with a company and to improve business relationships with customers, specifically focusing on customer retention and ultimately driving sales growth. One important aspect of the CRM approach is the systems of CRM that compile data from a range of different communication channels, including a company's website, telephone, email, live chat, marketing materials, and social media. Through the CRM approach and the systems used to facilitate CRM, businesses learn more about their target audiences and how to best cater to their needs. However, adopting the CRM approach may also occasionally lead to favoritism within an audience of consumers, resulting in dissatisfaction among customers and defeating the purpose of CRM.
2. Innovation is defined by Michael Szycher as a "new idea, device, or method," or the use of better solutions that accommodate new needs or solve new problems. To accomplish this, more effective products, processes, services, technologies and business models are required by markets, governments and society. Innovation is something original that occurs via the engineering process and is able to break into a market and is similar to invention. In industrial economics, innovations work to meet a growing consumer demand.
3. Training in social-media techniques, tactics and unwritten rules may not be needed for "parseltongues", such as workers who are already comfortable and experienced with using social media. However, for workers who are not familiar with social media, formal or informal training may be needed. Brand management and engagement is done differently on social media platforms than over traditional advertising formats such as TV and radio ads. To give just one example, with traditional ads, customers cannot respond to the ad. However, if an organization makes a major gaffe or politically incorrect statement on social media, customers and other regular citizens can immediately post comments about the ad.
4. Knowledge management could take place in traditional small businesses (such as coffeehouses and ice cream parlours) just by using the owner-proprietor's own memory of his key customers, their preferences, and their client-service expectations. However, with the shift to national or even multinational e-commerce businesses which operate online, companies are generating far more data on transactions for a single person or even a team to grasp just in their memory. As such, 2010-era global e-commerce firms typically use a range of digital tools to track, monitor and analyze the huge streams of data their businesses are generating, a process called "data mining".

== Monitoring, tracking and analysis of consumers ==
Companies are increasingly using social media monitoring tools to monitor, track, and analyze online conversations on the Web about their brand or products or about related topics of interest. This can be useful in public relations management and advertising campaign tracking, allowing the companies to measure return on investment for their social media ad spending, competitor-auditing, and for public engagement. Tools range from free, basic applications to subscription-based, more in-depth tools.

Social media tracking also enables companies to respond quickly to online posts that criticize their product or service. By responding quickly to critical online posts, and helping the user to resolve the concerns, this helps the company to lessen the negative effects that online complaints can have about company product or service sales. In the US, for example, if a customer criticizes a major hotel chain's cleanliness or service standards on a social media website, a company representative will usually quickly be alerted to this critical post, so that the company representative can go online and express concern for the sub-par service and offer the complaining person a coupon or discount on their next purchase, plus a promise to forward their concerns to the hotel manager so that the problem will not be repeated. This rapid response helps to show that the company cares about its customers.

The "honeycomb framework" defines how social media services focus on some or all of seven functional building blocks. These building blocks help explain the engagement needs of the social media audience. For instance, LinkedIn users are thought to care mostly about identity, reputation, and relationships, whereas YouTube's primary features are sharing, conversations, groups, and reputation. Many companies build their own social "containers" that attempt to link the seven functional building blocks around their brands. These are private communities that engage people around a more narrow theme, as in around a particular brand, vocation or hobby, rather than social media containers such as Google+, Facebook, and Twitter. PR departments face significant challenges in dealing with viral negative sentiment directed at organizations or individuals on social media platforms (dubbed "sentimentitis"), which may be a reaction to an announcement or event. In a 2011 article, Jan H. Kietzmann, Kristopher Hermkens, Ian P. McCarthy and Bruno S. Silvestre describe the honeycomb relationship as "present[ing] a framework that defines social media by using seven functional building blocks: identity, conversations, sharing, presence, relationships, reputation, and groups".

== Social authority ==
Social media marketing becomes effective through a process called "building social authority". One of the foundation concepts in social media has become that you cannot completely control your message through social media but rather you can simply begin to participate in the "conversation" expecting that you can achieve a significant influence in that conversation. However, this conversation participation must be cleverly executed because although people are resistant to marketing in general, they are even more resistant to direct or overt marketing through social media platforms. This may seem counterintuitive but it is the main reason building social authority with credibility is so important. A marketer can generally not expect people to be receptive to a marketing message in and of itself. In the Edelman Trust Barometer report in 2008, the majority (58%) of the respondents reported they most trusted company or product information coming from "people like me" inferred to be information from someone they trusted. In the 2010 Trust Report, the majority switched to 64% preferring their information from industry experts and academics. According to Inc. Technology's Brent Leary, "This loss of trust, and the accompanying turn towards experts and authorities, seems to be coinciding with the rise of social media and networks."

== Market research ==
Social media has had a significant impact on businesses in terms of market research. As a result of the changes in consumer communication habits, due to the rise in the use of social media platforms, traditional research methods have become less effective. Long established methods such as telephone and email conversations, used by businesses have begun to decline in terms of quality and ability to reach customers when attempting to gain opinions and insights. However, this has had many positive implications. New and innovative market research methods have been formed in replacement which better suit the preferences of the modern consumer.
