= Itea =

Itea may refer to:

- Itea (plant), a genus of plants
  - Itea ilicifolia, holly-leaved sweetspire
  - Itea virginica, Virginia sweetspire
- Places in Greece (Ἰτέα):
  - Itea, Phocis, a town and a municipality in the southeastern part of Phocis, on the Gulf of Corinth
  - Itea, Evros, a village in the southeastern part of the Evros regional unit
  - Itea, Florina, a village in the northcentral part of Florina regional unit
  - Itea, Grevena, a village in the eastern part of Grevena regional unit
  - Itea, Ioannina, a village in the eastern part of Ioannina regional unit
  - Itea, Karditsa, a village in the northeastern part of Karditsa regional unit, part of Fyllo.
  - Itea, Larissa, a village in the northeastern part of Larissa regional unit

ITEA as an acronym may refer to:

- International Tuba Euphonium Association
- International Technology Education Association
- International Test and Evaluation Association
- Information Technology for European Advancement (ITEA2)

== See also ==
- Sitia, Crete, called Ητεία (Itia, Itea, Etea) in the ancient period
