= List of National Association of Biology Teachers presidents =

This is a list of the presidents of the National Association of Biology Teachers, from 1939 to the present.

== 2020s ==
2027: Kristy Daniel

2026: Vedham Karpakakunjarum

2025: Kirstin Milks

2024: Amanda Townley

2023: Tara Jo Holmberg

2022: Chris Monsour

2021: Julie Angle

2020: Sharon Gusky

== 2010s ==
2019: Sherri Annee

2018: Elizabeth Cowles

2017: Susan Finazzo

2016: Bob Melton

2015: Jane Ellis

2014: Stacey Kiser

2013: Mark Little

2012: Don French

2011: Dan Ward

2010: Marion V. "Bunny" Jaskot

== 2000s ==
2009-John M. Moore
2008-Todd Carter
2007-Pat Waller
2006-Toby Horn
2005-Rebecca E. Ross
2004-Betsy Ott
2003-Catherine Ueckert
2002-Brad Williamson
2001-Ann S. Lumsden
2000-Phil McCrea

== 1990s ==
1999-Richard D. Storey
1998-ViviannLee Ward
1997-Alan McCormack
1996-Elizabeth Carvellas
1995-Gordon E. Uno
1994-Barbara Schulz
1993-Ivo E. Lindauer
1992-Alton L. Biggs
1991-Joseph D. McInerney
1990-Nancy V. Ridenour

== 1980s ==
1989-John Penick
1988-Jane Abbott
1987-Donald S. Emmeluth
1986-George S. Zahrobsky
1985-Thromas R. Mertens
1984-Marjorie King
1983-Jane Butler Kahle
1982-Jerry Resnick
1981-Edward J. Komondy
1980-Stanley D. Roth

== 1970s ==
1979-Manert Kennedy
1978-Glen E. Peterson
1977-Jack L. Carter
1976-Haven Kolb
1975-Thomas Jesse Cleaver, Sr., PhD (1926–1995)
1974-Barbara K. Hopper
1973-Addison E. Lee
1972-Claude A. Welch
1971-H. Bentley Glass
1970-Robert E. Yager

== 1960s ==
1969-Burton E. Voss
1968-Jack Fishleder
1967-William V. Mayer
1966-Arnold B. Grobman
1965-L.S. McClung
1964-Ted F. Andrews
1963-Philip R. Fordyce
1962-Muriel Beuschlein
1961-Paul V. Webster
1960-Howard E. Weaver

== 1950s ==
1959-Paul Klinge
1958-Irene Hollenbeck
1957-John Breukelman
1956-John P. Harrold
1955-Brother H. Charles Severin
1954-Arthur J. Baker
1953-Leo F. Hadsall
1952-Harvey E. Stork
1951-Richard L. Weaver
1950-Betty L. Wheeler

== 1940s ==
1949-Ruth A. Dodge
1948-Howard A. Michaud
1947-E. Laurence Palmer
1946-Prevo L. Whitaker
1945-Helen Trowbridge
1944-1943-Merle A. Russell
1942-Homer A. Stephens
1941-George W. Jeffers
1940-Malcolm D. Campbell

== 1930s ==
1939-Myrl C. Lichtenwalter
