= Jeff Weld =

Educator

Jeffrey Weld
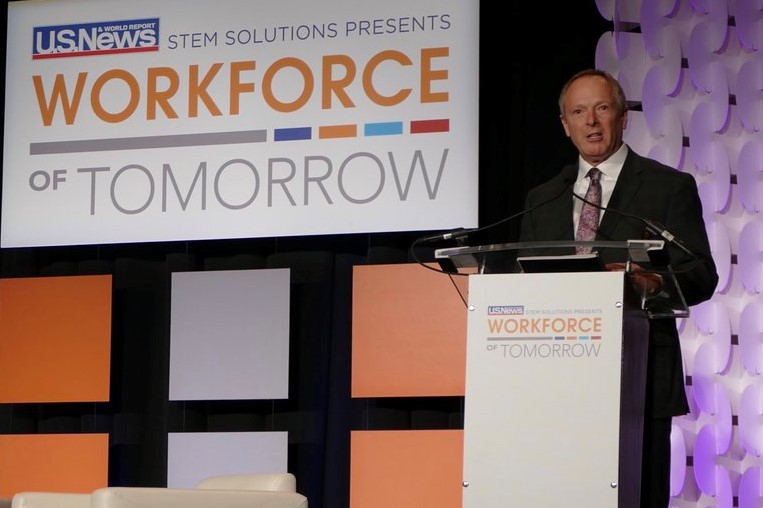
- Jeff Weld keynote at US News STEM Solutions Summit April 6, 2018
- Born: August 17, 1960 (age 66); Glendale, California
- Other name: Jeff
- Occupation: Executive Director Professor

Jeffrey Jeff Weld (born August 17, 1960, in Glendale, California) is a writer, speaker, advisor and executive coach in the field of STEM education. He is currently Senior Policy Advisor for the STEM Education Coalition, professor emeritus at the University of Northern Iowa, and an executive consultant. In December of 2023 Weld completed a five-month appointment as Chief Innovation Officer for the Iowa Department of Education, and twelve-year appointment as Executive Director for the Iowa Governor's STEM Advisory Council, a post he'd occupied since its launching in 2011. Additionally, on September 23, 2019 Dr. Weld completed 21 months of national service as STEM Education Policy Consultant for the White House Office of Science and Technology Policy. On leave from Iowa STEM through 2018 to be Senior Policy Advisor and Assistant Director leading the production of America's Strategic Plan for STEM Education published on December 4, 2018, and part-time through 2019 as advisor on Federal implementation of the plan. The experience was recounted in the memoir "Charting a Course for American Education from out on a limb at the executive branch" (Torchflame Books, 2021). From 2000 to 2023 Weld was a faculty member in the Department of Biology at the University of Northern Iowa (UNI) in Cedar Falls, Iowa.

Weld is a prolific author, focused on visioning of America's STEM education movement, and as a former professor on overcoming impediments to high quality science teaching. In addition to the memoir mentioned previously, his book "Creating a STEM Culture for Teaching and Learning" (NSTA Press), examines all aspects of the nation's STEM (science-technology-engineering-mathematics) movement. A decorated former educator, Weld was named 1993 Life Science Teacher of the Year in Iowa, Pella Corporation's Focus on Teaching Excellence award in 1994, and in 1995 a National Access Excellence Fellowship by the Genentech corporation. The National Association of Biology Teachers named Weld the National Collegiate Biology Teacher of The Year for four-year institutions in 2007. In 2013, the Iowa Academy of Science bestowed upon Weld the Outstanding Service award and his alma mater, the University of Iowa recognized Weld with the College of Education's Alumni Accomplishment Honor. In 2014, he received a STEM Champion award from the Triangle Coalition.

== Early life and education ==
Weld is the fifth of six offspring (Vicki, Douglas, Rhonda, Sandra, Eric) of single parent Aileen (Feany) Weld, a career government servant, first for the FBI then for the Veterans Administration. Weld's father Don had served in the Marine Corp and written for newspapers. Weld spent his early school years, 1969 to 1977, in Iowa City, Iowa, before relocating to Northampton, Massachusetts, and graduating from Northampton High School in 1978. A first-generation collegian, he attended Greenfield Community College in Massachusetts before transferring to the University of Iowa in 1980. He earned a bachelor of science degree in secondary education from the University of Iowa in 1983. After serving Camp Fire youth camps in Anchorage, Alaska, followed by ski lodge maintenance and customer service at Millers Inn, Winter Park, Colorado, he returned to the University of Iowa for graduate study, credentialed in science education (biology) in 1985. From 1990 to 1992 Weld pursued a masters in biology at the University of Missouri-St. Louis. He completed a master's degree in Science Education at the University of Iowa in 1994. In 1998, Weld completed the doctoral program in Science Education at the University of Iowa under John Penick and Robert Yager, empirically resolving extrinsic reward effects on science teaching, while earning competencies in ecology for work in predator-prey aquatic population regulation, and endocrinology for work on molt hormone synthesis in Cancer antennarius

== Career ==
Prior to current advisory and consultancy roles, Governor Reynolds appointed Dr. Weld Chief Innovation Officer for the Iowa Department of Education in July, 2023, while continuing his twelve-year appointment as executive director of the Governor's STEM Advisory Council. On December 1, 2023, Weld stepped down from both positions in order to serve the broader national STEM education community. From December 11, 2017, to December 10, 2018 Dr. Weld stepped away from directing Iowa STEM to complete an appointment to the White House Office of Science and Technology Policy as Senior Policy Advisor for STEM Education. His main responsibility at the OSTP was to lead the development of the 5-year Federal STEM Education Strategic Plan. He remained attached to the OSTP as consultant through the rollout and implementation phases of the Federal STEM Strategic Plan through September 23, 2019. Under Weld's directorship of Iowa's statewide STEM program, annual gains in test scores, elective enrollments, post-secondary enrollments, and public support for STEM education have been documented. Weld previously directed the inter-university collaborative program the Iowa Mathematics and Science Education Partnership from 2008 to 2011. Weld hosted an annual Midwest STEM Leaders Forum convening STEM leaders of 10 neighboring states, and served on the Boards of the national organizations the Triangle Coalition for STEM Education and the National Alliance for Partnerships in Equity Education Foundation. From 2000 to 2008 Dr. Weld served graduate and undergraduate students in the department of biology at the University of Northern Iowa where he created a minor in Natural History Interpretation, taught courses in teacher preparation, published in scholarly and consumer press including the popular textbook The Game of Science Education. During his faculty service Weld won $7.2 million in external funding, operated a teachers-in-research program, conducted faculty workshops on interdisciplinarity through Carver Trust grants, presided over the Iowa science teachers association, chaired the campus chapter of the scientific research society Sigma Xi, and served as Provost's Administrative Fellow for the university's central administration. From 1998 to 2000, Dr. Weld was an assistant professor in science education at Oklahoma State University. From 1985 to 1996 Weld taught high school sciences in Mission, Texas (1985-1988), Kirkwood, Missouri (1988 to 1992), and Pella, Iowa (1992-1996) and coached football, wrestling, baseball, basketball, and soccer. During that time he wrote columns for Educational Leadership and Phi Delta Kappan, among others.

== Personal ==
Weld resides in Cedar Falls, Iowa with his wife Mary Kathleen Rovane Weld, and has two grown sons, Andrew (Madison) of St. Paul, Minnesota, and David (Liz) of Kansas City, Missouri.

== Organizations ==
Weld is a member of the following organizations: Sigma Xi scientific research society; Epsilon Pi Tau international technology honor society; National Association of Science Writers (NASW); Association for Science Teacher Education (ASTE); National Science Teachers Association (NSTA); Computer Science Teachers Association (CSTA); Iowa Academy of Science (IAS); Iowa Council of Teachers of Mathematics (ICTM).
