= Exarchos =

Exarchos may refer to:

- Exarch, a governor in the Byzantine Empire with extended authority over a province at some distance from the capital Constantinople
- Exarchos, Grevena, a village in Greece
- Exarchos, Phthiotis, a village in Greece
