= Shymansky =

Shymansky is a surname. Notable people with the surname include:

- James A. Shymansky, American academic
- Stanislav Shymansky (born 1985), Ukrainian sprint canoeist
