= Pistiko =

Pistiko Πιστικό
- Settlement
- Location within Greece
- Coordinates: 40°5.3′N 21°33.5′E
- Country: Greece
- Administrative region: Western Macedonia
- Regional unit: Grevena
- Municipality: Grevena
- Municipal unit: Ventzio
- Community: Knidi
- Elevation: 620 m (2,030 ft)

Population (2021)
  - Total: 29
- Time zone: UTC+2 (EET)
  - Summer (DST): UTC+3 (EEST)
- Postal code: 511 00
- Area code: +30-2462
- Vehicle registration: PN

Pistiko (Greek: Πιστικό, before 1927: Πισκό – Pisko) is a village of the Grevena municipality. Before the 2011 local government reform it was a part of the municipality of Ventzio. The 2021 census recorded 29 residents in the village. Pistiko is a part of the community of Knidi. According to the statistics of Vasil Kanchov ("Macedonia, Ethnography and Statistics"), 255 Vallahades (Grecophone Muslims) lived in the village in 1900.

== See also ==
- List of settlements in the Grevena regional unit
