= Neochori, Grevena =

Neochori Νεοχώρι
- Settlement
- Location within Greece
- Coordinates: 39°59.2′N 21°41.1′E
- Country: Greece
- Administrative region: Western Macedonia
- Regional unit: Grevena
- Municipality: Grevena
- Municipal unit: Ventzio
- Community: Sarakina
- Elevation: 570 m (1,870 ft)

Population (2021)
  - Total: 87
- Time zone: UTC+2 (EET)
  - Summer (DST): UTC+3 (EEST)
- Postal code: 511 00
- Area code: +30-2462
- Vehicle registration: PN

Neochori (Greek: Νεοχώρι, before 1950: Γουρουνάκι – Gourounaki) is a village in the Grevena municipality. Before the 2011 local government reform, it was a part of the municipality of Ventzio. The 2021 census recorded 87 residents in the village. Neochori is a part of the community of Sarakina.

== See also ==
- List of settlements in the Grevena regional unit
