= Sarakina, Grevena =

Sarakina Σαρακήνα
- Community
- Location within Greece
- Coordinates: 40°1.6′N 21°39.1′E
- Country: Greece
- Administrative region: Western Macedonia
- Regional unit: Grevena
- Municipality: Grevena
- Municipal unit: Ventzio

Area
  - Community: 49.887 km^{2} (19.261 sq mi)
- Elevation: 676 m (2,218 ft)

Population (2021)
  - Community: 318
  - Density: 6.37/km^{2} (16.5/sq mi)
- Time zone: UTC+2 (EET)
  - Summer (DST): UTC+3 (EEST)
- Postal code: 511 00
- Area code: +30-2462
- Vehicle registration: PN

Sarakina (Greek: Σαρακήνα) is a village and a community of the Grevena municipality. Before the 2011 local government reform it was a part of the municipality of Ventzio, of which it was a municipal district. The 2021 census recorded 318 residents in the community. The community of Sarakina covers an area of 49.887 km^{2}.

== Administrative division ==
The community of Sarakina consists of three separate settlements:

- Diporo (population 66 as of 2021)
- Neochori (population 87)
- Sarakina (population 165)

== See also ==
- List of settlements in the Grevena regional unit
