= Epsilon Pi Tau =

International technology honor society

- ΕΠΤ
- Founded: March 13, 1929; 97 years ago Ohio State University
- Type: Honor
- Affiliation: ACHS
- Status: Active
- Emphasis: Technology
- Scope: International
- Colors: Blue, White and Gold
- Publication: The Journal of Technology Studies, The Preceptor
- Chapters: 125+
- Members: 100,000 lifetime
- Headquarters: Epsilon Pi Tau International Office c/o Bowling Green State University; Bowling Green, Ohio 43403; United States
- Website: www.epsilonpitau.org

Epsilon Pi Tau (ΕΠΤ or EPT) is an international honor society for collegiate students and professionals in the field of technology. It recognizes the academics of students, preparation for practitioners, and outstanding professionals. It is a member of the Association of College Honor Societies.

== History ==
Epsilon Pi Tau, National Honorary Fraternity in Practical Arts and Vocational Education was founded by professor William E. Warner at Ohio State University on March 13, 1929. It was created as an honorary fraternity for students in vocational education and practical arts. Its "purpose was to recognize and promote leadership through an emphasis on skill, social efficiency, and research." Warner also wanted to elevate the profession's prestige.

Warner, who had established the Ph.D. program in industrial arts at Ohio State, worked with his graduate students and industry connections to create the fraternity's by-laws and constitution. The original officers included Warner, E. L. Bowman, H. J. Davison, and O. E. Sink. Bowman developed the fraternity's initiation ritual. Warner served as the organization's executive secretary from 1929 until he died in 1971.

The fraternity became national with the establishment of its Beta chapter at Ball State University in 1931. It published The Epsilon Pi Tau Review from 1930 to 1934.

Epsilon Pi Tau was incorporated on April 15, 1942, in the State of Ohio as a nonprofit honorary professional fraternity. It began admitting women in 1945. In 1993, the organization changed its incorporation from an honorary fraternity to an "honorary for professions in technology; it became "the international honor society for professions in technology" in 2003. Epsilon Pi Tau became a member of the Association of College Honor Societies in 2005.

As of 2024, Epsilon Pi Tau has initiated more than 100,000 members since its establishment. It has chartered more than 125 chapters at four-year and two-year colleges and universities. The society was based in Columbus, Ohio, for 45 years. Its international headquarters is at Bowling Green State University in Bowling Green, Ohio.

== Symbols ==
The name, Epsilon Pi Tau was selected to represent the initials of the society's precepts. Epsilon stands for the Greek word exetasis or research and its applications and products. Pi represents pragmateia or social and professional proficiency. Tau stands for texnikh which means technological capability and skill.

Epsilon Pi Tau's emblem is an equilateral triangle key inscribed with TEXNIKH, PRAGMATEIA, and EXETASIS along each side. At the corners of the triangle are pins that feature the Greek letters Ε, Π, and Τ. It is worn as a key or a pin. The key for laureate distinguished service members is like the emblem with the addition of a diamond or diamond-like stone mounted in the center.

The colors of Epsilon Pi Tau are blue, white, and gold. The colors represent texnikh, pragmateia, and exetasis, respectively. Members may wear a blue, white, and gold honor cord as part of their academic regalia to denote membership.

== Activities ==
Epsilon Pi Tau publishes The Epsilon Pi Tau Preceptor and The Journal of Technology Studies, called The Journal of Epsilon Pi Tau from 1974 to 1992. Epsilon Pi Tau holds its International Convocation and Member Forum quadrennially.

The society's William Everett Warner Awards Program recognizes collegiate members and professionals for writing, research, and professional accomplishments. The program also recognizes chapters for programs and services. The Warner Awards distributes $20,000 annually.

Epsilon Pi Tau's Paul T. Hiser Exemplary Publication Award annually presents $500 to the best article in The Journal of Technology Studies.

Chapters also organize charitable and educational activities; the North Carolina State University chapter helped host STEM Explorers, a digital fabrication camp for foster children.

== Membership ==
To be eligible for membership in Epsilon Pi Tau, undergraduate students must be enrolled in technology programs, have completed thirty semester hours with a 3.25 GPA in major courses, and rank in the top 35% of the class. Graduate students are eligible for membership if they have completed nine semester hours with a 3.3 GPA.

The society has three membership levels: general member, laureate member, and distinguished service member. The latter two levels are attained through professional performance and accomplishment for faculty, academic support staff, and alumni of programs with Epsilon Pi Tau chapters.

== Chapters ==
Epsilon Pi Tau has more than 125 campus (collegiate) chapters and field (alumni and professional) chapters.

== Notable members ==
- John Penick, professor of science education at the University of Iowa
- William E. Warner, professor of industrial arts education at Ohio State University and the founder of Epsilon Tau Pi and the American Industrial Arts Association
- Jeff Weld, writer, speaker, advisor and executive coach in the field of STEM education
- Kenneth W. Winters (Beta Gamma), Kentucky State Senate and as president of Campbellsville University

== See also ==
- Honor cords
- Honor society
- Professional fraternities and sororities
