= Lagkadakia, Grevena =

Lagkadakia
- Settlement
- Location within Greece
- Coordinates: 40°7′22″N 21°31′30″E
- Country: Greece
- Geographic region: Macedonia
- Administrative region: Western Macedonia
- Regional unit: Grevena
- Municipality: Grevena
- Municipal unit: Ventzio
- Community: Knidi
- Time zone: UTC+2 (EET)
  - Summer (DST): UTC+3 (EEST)
- Vehicle registration: ΚΖ

Lagkadakia (Greek: Λαγκαδάκια, before 1919: Λούντσι – Lountsi, between 1919 and 1927: Λουτσίσνο – Loutsisno) was a village in Grevena Regional Unit, Macedonia, Greece. It was part of the community of Knidi.

The 1920 Greek census recorded 2 people in the village. Following the Greek–Turkish population exchange, Greek refugee families were from Asia Minor (9) and Pontus (14) in 1926. The 1928 Greek census recorded 62 village inhabitants. In 1928, the refugee families numbered 23 (71 people). The village was abolished on 5 April 1981.

== See also ==
- List of settlements in the Grevena regional unit
