= Mikrokleisoura, Grevena =

Mikrokleisoura Μικροκλεισούρα
- Settlement
- Location within Greece
- Coordinates: 40°8.9′N 21°32.8′E
- Country: Greece
- Administrative region: Western Macedonia
- Regional unit: Grevena
- Municipality: Grevena
- Municipal unit: Ventzio
- Community: Knidi
- Elevation: 570 m (1,870 ft)

Population (2021)
  - Total: 24
- Time zone: UTC+2 (EET)
  - Summer (DST): UTC+3 (EEST)
- Postal code: 511 00
- Area code: +30-2462
- Vehicle registration: PN

Mikrokleisoura (Greek: Μικροκλεισούρα, before 1927: Σαδοβίτσα – Sadovitsa) is a village of the Grevena municipality. Before the 2011 local government reform it was a part of the municipality of Ventzio. The 2021 census recorded 24 residents in the village. Mikrokleisoura is a part of the community of Knidi.

Following the Greek–Turkish population exchange, Greek refugee families in Sadovitsa were from Pontus (26) in 1926. The 1928 Greek census recorded 98 village inhabitants. In 1928, the refugee families numbered 26 (86 people).

== See also ==
- List of settlements in the Grevena regional unit
