= Chirality Medal =

Award for scientists

The Chirality Medal, instituted by the Società Chimica Italiana in 1991 to honor internationally recognized scientists who have made a distinguished contribution to all aspects of chirality, is awarded each year by a Chirality Medal Honor Committee composed of the Chirality International Committee members and the most recent recipients of the Chirality Medal. The medal is awarded to the recipient at the International Conference on Chirality.

== List of Past Winners ==
Year	Winner	Country
1991	Emanuel Gil-Av	Israel
	Jean Jacques	France
1992	Vladimir Prelog	Switzerland
1993	Kurt Mislow	United States
1994	William H. Pirkle	United States
1995	Koji Nakanishi	United States
1996	Ernest. L. Eliel	United States
1997	Ryoji Noyori	Japan
1998	Henri B. Kagan	France
1999	Vadim Davankov	Russia
2000	K. Barry Sharpless	United States
2001	Yoshio Okamoto	Japan
2002	Dieter Seebach	Switzerland
2003	Daniel W. Armstrong	United States
2004	Volker Schurig	Germany
2005	Kensō Soai	Japan
2006	Meir Lahav	Israel
2007	Nina Berova	United States
2008	Wolfgang Lindner	Austria
2009	Bernard L. Feringa	Netherlands
2010	Kenji Mori	Japan
2011	Laurence D. Barron	United Kingdom
2012	Eric N. Jacobsen	United States
2013	Eiji Yashima	Japan
2014	Manfred T. Reetz	Germany
2015	Christopher J. Welch	United States
2016	Andreas Pfaltz	Switzerland
2017	Takuzo Aida	Japan
2018	Bert Meijer	Netherlands
2019	Laurence A. Nafie	United States
2022	David MacMillan	United States
2023	Ron Naaman	Israel
2024	Nicholas A. Kotov	United States
2025	Eric V. Anslyn	United States
2026	Jeanne Crassous	France

== See also ==
- List of chemistry awards
