= Rachel Mamlok-Naaman =

Israeli chemist

- רחל ממלק-נעמן
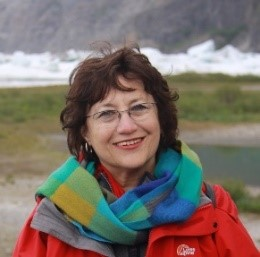
- Education: Bar-Ilan University
- Scientific career
- Fields: Chemistry; Science education
- Workplaces: Weizmann Institute of Science
- Thesis: The effect of a teaching unit: "Science: An Ever-Developing Entity" on Students' Perceptions and Attitudes towards Science and Science Learning (1998)
- Doctoral advisor: Ruth Ben-Zvi, Joseph Menis, Joseph Nussbaum

Rachel Mamlok-Naaman (Hebrew: רחל ממלק-נעמן) is an Israeli academic specializing in chemistry education.

== Education ==
Rachel Mamlok-Naaman received a BSc in chemistry at Hebrew University in 1966, a MA in science education at Bar-Ilan University in 1992, and a PhD in science education Bar-Ilan University in 1998. She conducted post-doctoral research with John Penick at North Carolina State University and with Joe Krajcik at University of Michigan.

== Career ==
Prior to obtaining her doctorate degree, Mamlok-Naaman was a high school chemistry teacher for 26 years. She is a faculty member of Department of Science Teaching at the Weizmann Institute of Science. She was the head of National Center for Chemistry Teachers at the Weizmann Institute of Science from 1996 to 2016 and from 2018 to 2020. Her research in chemistry education included topics on misconceptions in learning in chemistry, sustainability in chemistry education, profession development of educators, and gender gap. She participates in a number of past and current International Union of Pure and Applied Chemistry projects, including the project on "The Gender Gap in Chemistry – Building on the ISC Gender Gap Project" and "Design for International Standards for Chemistry Education".

Mamlok-Naaman is the chair of the European Chemical Society Division of Chemical Education, and a member of International Union of Pure and Applied Chemistry Committee on Chemistry Education. She serves as vice editor-in-chief of Chemistry Teacher International. She also serves on the editorial board of International Journal of Science and Mathematics Education, Eurasia Journal of Mathematics, Science and Technology Education, and Journal of Innovations in Teaching and Learning; and on the editorial advisory board of Journal of the Turkish Chemical Society Section C: Chemical Education, and Chemistry Education: Research and Practice in Europe.

== Awards ==
- 2021 International Union of Pure and Applied Chemistry Distinguished Women in Chemistry or Chemical Engineering Award
- 2018 American Chemical Society Committee on Environmental Improvement Award for "Education for sustainable development in high school through inquiry-type socio-scientific issues"
- 2006 Weizmann Institute’s Scientific Council Maxine Singer Prize for Outstanding Research Associate
