= Takuzō =

- Gender: Male

Origin
- Origin: Japanese
- Meaning: Different meanings depending on the kanji used

Takuzō, Takuzo or Takuzou (written: 卓三 or 拓三) is a masculine Japanese given name. Notable people with the name include:

- Takuzo Aida (相田 卓三) (born 1956), Japanese scientist
- Takuzo Kawatani (川谷 拓三) (1941–1995), Japanese actor
