= Kentro, Grevena =

Kentro Κέντρο
- Community
- Location within Greece
- Coordinates: 40°1.1′N 21°37.3′E
- Country: Greece
- Administrative region: Western Macedonia
- Regional unit: Grevena
- Municipality: Grevena
- Municipal unit: Ventzio

Area
  - Community: 42.42 km^{2} (16.38 sq mi)
- Elevation: 654 m (2,146 ft)

Population (2021)
  - Community: 161
  - Density: 3.80/km^{2} (9.83/sq mi)
- Time zone: UTC+2 (EET)
  - Summer (DST): UTC+3 (EEST)
- Postal code: 511 00
- Area code: +30-2462
- Vehicle registration: PN

Kentro (Greek: Κέντρο, before 1927: Βέντσια – Ventsia) is a village and a community of the Grevena municipality. Before the 2011 local government reform it was a part of the municipality of Ventzio, of which it was a municipal district. The 2021 census recorded 161 residents in the community. The community of Kentro covers an area of 42.42 km^{2}.

According to the statistics of Vasil Kanchov ("Macedonia, Ethnography and Statistics"), 207 Greek Christians and 150 Greek Muslims lived in the village in 1900.

Ventsia was a mixed village and a part of its population were Greek speaking Muslim Vallahades. The 1920 Greek census recorded 261 people in the village, and 260 inhabitants were Muslim in 1923. Following the Greek–Turkish population exchange, Greek refugee families in Ventsia were from Asia Minor (3) and Pontus (35) in 1926. The 1928 Greek census recorded 131 village inhabitants. In 1928, the refugee families numbered 39 (122 people).

== Administrative division ==
The community of Kentro consists of three separate settlements:

- Agalaioi (population 38 as of 2021)
- Kentro (population 68)
- Nisi (population 55)

== See also ==
- List of settlements in the Grevena regional unit
