= Palaioknidi =

- Settlement
- Location within Greece
- Coordinates: 40°06′48″N 21°35′07″E
- Country: Greece
- Geographic region: Macedonia
- Administrative region: Western Macedonia
- Regional unit: Kozani
- Municipality: Grevena
- Municipal unit: Ventzio
- Community: Knidi
- Time zone: UTC+2 (EET)
  - Summer (DST): UTC+3 (EEST)
- Vehicle registration: ΚΖ

Palaioknidi (Greek: Παλαιοκνίδη, before 1927: Παλαιοκόπριβα – Palaiokopriva) was a village in Kozani Regional Unit, Macedonia, Greece. It was part of the community of Knidi.

The 1920 Greek census recorded 40 people in the village. Following the Greek–Turkish population exchange, Greek refugee families in Palaiokopriva were from Pontus (15) in 1926. The 1928 Greek census recorded 40 village inhabitants. In 1928, the refugee families numbered 15 (52 people). The village was abolished on 7 April 1951.

== See also ==
- List of settlements in the Grevena regional unit
