= Varis, Grevena =

Varis Βάρης
- Settlement
- Location within Greece
- Coordinates: 40°7.5′N 21°40′E
- Country: Greece
- Administrative region: Western Macedonia
- Regional unit: Grevena
- Municipality: Grevena
- Municipal unit: Ventzio
- Community: Exarchos
- Elevation: 730 m (2,400 ft)

Population (2021)
  - Total: 37
- Time zone: UTC+2 (EET)
  - Summer (DST): UTC+3 (EEST)
- Postal code: 511 00
- Area code: +30-2462
- Vehicle registration: PN

Varis (Greek: Βάρης, before 1927: Βάρτσα – Vartsa) is a village of the Grevena municipality. Before the 2011 local government reform it was a part of the municipality of Ventzio. The 2021 census recorded 37 residents in the village. Varis is a part of the community of Exarchos.

== See also ==
- List of settlements in the Grevena regional unit
