= Pefkaki, Kozani =

Pefkaki
- Settlement
- Location within Greece
- Coordinates: 40°6′20″N 21°37′17″E
- Country: Greece
- Geographic region: Macedonia
- Administrative region: Western Macedonia
- Regional unit: Grevena
- Municipality: Grevena
- Municipal unit: Ventzio
- Community: Knidi
- Time zone: UTC+2 (EET)
  - Summer (DST): UTC+3 (EEST)
- Vehicle registration: ΚΖ

Pefkaki (Greek: Πευκάκι, before 1963: Κολοκυθάκι – Kolokithaki) was a village in Grevena Regional Unit, Macedonia, Greece. It was part of the community of Knidi.

== Demographics ==
Following the Greek–Turkish population exchange, Greek refugee families in Kolokithaki were from Pontus (39) in 1926. The 1928 Greek census recorded 106 village inhabitants. In 1928, the refugee families numbered 39 (114 people).

The village was abolished on 5 April 1981.

== See also ==
- List of settlements in the Grevena regional unit
