= Agalaioi =

Agalaioi Αγαλαίοι
- Settlement
- Location within Greece
- Coordinates: 40°1.7′N 21°37.3′E
- Country: Greece
- Administrative region: Western Macedonia
- Regional unit: Grevena
- Municipality: Grevena
- Municipal unit: Ventzio
- Community: Kentro
- Elevation: 720 m (2,360 ft)

Population (2021)
  - Total: 38
- Time zone: UTC+2 (EET)
  - Summer (DST): UTC+3 (EEST)
- Postal code: 511 00
- Area code: +30-2462
- Vehicle registration: PN

Agalaioi (Greek: Αγαλαίοι) is a village of the Grevena municipality. Before the 2011 local government reform it was a part of the municipality of Ventzio. The 2021 census recorded 38 residents in the village. Agalaioi is a part of the community of Kentro.

Agalaioi was populated by Greek speaking Muslim Vallahades. The 1920 Greek census recorded 84 people in the village, and 85 inhabitants (18 families) were Muslim in 1923. Following the Greek–Turkish population exchange, 31 Greek refugee families in Agalaioi were from unidentified locations in 1926. The 1928 Greek census recorded 75 village inhabitants. In 1928, the refugee families numbered 31 (81 people).

== See also ==
- List of settlements in the Grevena regional unit
