= Nisi, Grevena =

Nisi Νησί
- Settlement
- Location within Greece
- Coordinates: 40°00′N 21°00′E
- Country: Greece
- Administrative region: Western Macedonia
- Regional unit: Grevena
- Municipality: Grevena
- Municipal unit: Ventzio
- Community: Kentro
- Elevation: 620 m (2,030 ft)

Population (2021)
  - Total: 55
- Time zone: UTC+2 (EET)
  - Summer (DST): UTC+3 (EEST)
- Postal code: 511 00
- Area code: +30-2462
- Vehicle registration: PN

Nisi (Greek: Νησί, before 1928: Νησινίκος – Nisinikos) is a village of the Grevena municipality. Before the 2011 local government reform it was a part of the municipality of Ventzio. The 2021 census recorded 55 residents in the village. Nisi is a part of the community of Kentro.

Nasinikos was populated by Greek speaking Muslim Vallahades. The 1920 Greek census recorded 199 people in the village, and 200 inhabitants (33 families) were Muslim in 1923. Following the Greek–Turkish population exchange, Greek refugee families in Nasinikos were from Pontus (63) in 1926. The 1928 Greek census recorded 182 village inhabitants. In 1928, the refugee families numbered 63 (181 people).

== See also ==
- List of settlements in the Grevena regional unit
