= Ron Naaman =

Israeli physical chemist

Ron Naaman FRSC, MAE
- רון נעמן
- Born: April 10, 1949 (age 77); Hadera, Israel
- Education: Ben-Gurion University of the Negev (B.Sc., 1973); Weizmann Institute of Science (Ph.D., 1977)
- Occupation: Physical chemist
- Known for: The study of the electronic properties of organic-inorganic interfaces, the study of the interaction of electrons and spin-polarized electrons with chiral systems
- Spouse: Rachel Mamlok-Naaman
- Awards: Fellow of the Royal Society of Chemistry; Fellow of the American Physical Society; Member of Academia Europaea; Chirality Medal
- Scientific career
- Fields: Physical chemistry
- Workplaces: Weizmann Institute of Science
- Doctoral advisor: Gad Fischer

Ron Naaman (Hebrew: רון נעמן; born April 10, 1949) FRSC, MAE is an Israeli physical chemist and Professor Emeritus at the Weizmann Institute of Science. He is known for his work on the electronic properties of organic–inorganic interfaces and for pioneering studies on the chirality-induced spin selectivity (CISS) effect.

Naaman is a former head of the Institute’s Department of Chemical Physics and a former chair of the Weizmann Institute Scientific Council. His distinctions include the Kolthoff Prize in 2014, the Gold Medal of the Israel Chemical Society in 2022 and the Chirality Medal in 2023.

== Biography ==
Ron Naaman was born in Hadera, Israel. His father, Uri Naaman (Namenwirth), was the son of the founders of Moshav Yarkona and later established the Youth Department in the Be'er Sheva Municipality. His mother, Shoshana Mintz, was a teacher. He grew up in Be'er Sheva, Munich, and Haifa, where he graduated from Ironi Hei High School. He has one brother.

After his military service, he began his undergraduate studies in chemistry at Ben-Gurion University of the Negev, completing them in 1973. He then pursued a Ph.D. in chemistry under the supervision of Prof. Gad Fischer at Ben-Gurion University and the Weizmann Institute of Science. His doctoral dissertation, submitted in 1977, focused on the spectroscopy of organic molecules.

That same year, Naaman moved to the United States, where he spent two years as a postdoctoral fellow at Stanford University, under the guidance of Prof. Richard Zare, later a Wolf Prize laureate. Afterward, he worked for one year as a researcher and lecturer in the Department of Chemistry at Harvard University.

In 1980, he returned to Israel and joined the Weizmann Institute of Science as a senior lecturer in the Department of Isotope Research. In 1986, he was promoted to Associate Professor, and in 1992, he became a Full Professor. Between 1990 and 1994, he served as Head of the Department of Chemical Research Infrastructure, and from 1994 to 1999, he was Head of the Department of Chemical Physics.

In 2006, Naaman was appointed Deputy Chair of the Scientific Council of the Weizmann Institute, and in 2008, he became its Chairman, a position he held for two years. Over the years, he has also been a visiting professor at the University of Colorado, the University of Pittsburgh, and the University of California, Santa Barbara.

== Research ==
=== Spin-Dependent Electron Transport in Chiral Molecules ===
When an electron passes through chiral molecules, a specific spin is preferred over the other. The preferred spin depends on the chirality of the molecule, meaning, for a certain enantiomer, the preferred spin polarization is parallel to the electron's momentum, while for the other enantiomer, the preferred polarization is anti-parallel to the electron's momentum. This effect is known as "Chirality-Induced Spin Selectivity" (CISS).

Naaman’s group discovered this effect in 1999 and established that the interaction between chiral molecules is spin dependent. This finding explains the high enantioselectivity in nature. The CISS effect was found to enhancing the production of hydrogen in oxygen evolution reaction and to enable efficient oxygen reduction reaction that occurs in respiration and in fuel cells.

Due to this effect, chiral organic molecules can act as spin filters. Naaman’s group studied the spin polarization properties of various chiral molecules using diverse techniques, including Atomic Force Microscopy (AFM) to measure conductivity with a magnetic electrode (mc-AFM) at room temperature. This method senses spin selectivity in nanoscale structures, including the effect generated at the interface between chiral materials and the ferromagnetic material used for spin analysis.

The spin polarization measured with mc-AFM is reflected in the ratio of currents for two different magnetic configurations (up and down) at a certain voltage or as a relative percentage of spin polarization. It is important to understand whether the current-voltage dependence exists in the nonlinear region, thus providing insight into the sensitivity of mc-AFM to spin selectivity in conduction.

Naaman and his group observed spin polarization in the range of 85 to 90 percent in various systems, including supramolecular systems based on chiral and achiral molecules (derivatives of coronene bisimide and porphyrin) at room temperature. This measurement was conducted on the cross-sectional surface of a nanofiber.

=== Temperature-Dependent Magnetoresistance ===
Naaman's lab investigates the potential of chiral molecules for spintronic applications by creating a "spin valve", made possible by the magnetoresistance effect. The device they create has a geometry resembling a latch, allowing precise measurement of device resistance using a standard four-probe configuration.

Naaman uses magnetoresistance structures based on CISS, which differ from conventional magnetoresistance devices. In this device, a single magnetic electrode is used, and spin transport through the device is determined by the chirality of the molecules, with the magnetic electrode serving for spin conduction analysis. The magnetoresistance characteristics found this way are asymmetric with respect to the magnetic field sign, unlike what is observed in standard magnetoresistance devices. The reason for the asymmetry is the use of a single ferromagnetic electrode. Additionally, Naaman's group is studying the effect of temperature on magnetoresistance, as well as the magnetoresistance of polymers with L and D configurations. It has been found that the patterns of magnetoresistance in response to induced magnetic fields are inversely related to one another.

=== Enantiomeric Separation Using a Magnetic Substrate ===
Enantiomeric separation is an essential process in the chemical and pharmaceutical industries. It is commonly assumed that the identification of chirality and enantioselectivity, both in nature and artificial systems, is related solely to spatial effects. Naaman's group identified that the interaction of chiral molecules with a magnetic substrate magnetized in a perpendicular direction to its surface is enantioselective. When chiral molecules encounter a magnetic substrate, they become polarized. According to CISS, charge polarization is accompanied by spin polarization. When the spin orientation of the molecule becomes parallel to the spin orientation of the substrate, the interaction between the molecule and the substrate is not favored due to significant spin interactions. However, when the spin orientation is anti-parallel to the spin of the magnetic substrate, the interaction is favored due to minimal spin interaction.

Naaman's group demonstrated enantioselective absorption in a resin mixture based on a thiolated oligopetide attached to a gold-coated ferromagnetic substrate. This enantioselective interaction between chiral molecules and magnetic substrates forms the basis for a chromatographic method for enantiomeric separation. The group's goal is to create a reusable column based on this principle.

=== Spin-Dependent Electron Transport in Proteins ===
Naaman is studying the role of spin in charge transfer processes in protein molecules. This research has implications for understanding spin-dependent interactions and the effect of magnetic fields on electron conduction across biotic-abiotic interfaces in nature and biotechnological systems.

As part of this, his group is investigating multi-heme cytochromes located on bacterial cell surfaces. It is known that multi-heme cytochromes and other biomolecules, such as OmcA, function as long-range electron conductors (over distances greater than 10 nanometers) connecting intracellular reactions to external surfaces. Using the aforementioned technique, Naaman demonstrated that electron transport in these systems is spin-selective.

=== Guidance and Public Roles ===
Over the years, Naaman has co-authored over 350 papers published in leading journals and has edited two books. He has supervised about 30 graduate and PhD students and numerous postdoctoral fellows. He has been a member of several public committees and has chaired some of them, including the National Chemistry Committee for High Schools, the Higher Education Reform Committee in Israel, the Executive Committee of the Bichura Program, and the Scientific Committee of the Azrieli Foundation.

In the 2000s, he co-founded the "Hetz" movement, which advocated for unilateral separation from the Palestinians, along with his colleague Yehiam Prior and others.

== Professional service ==
Naaman has served on numerous scientific and advisory committees, including:

- Chairman, Israel Science Foundation panel on Nanomaterials (2024)
- Chairman, United States – Israel Binational Science Foundation panel on Materials (2024)
- Head, Nancy and Stephen Grand Research Center for Sensors and Security (2010–2015)
- Chairman, Scientific Council of the Weizmann Institute (2008–2010)
- Chairman, FIRST Foundation for interdisciplinary research (2005–2007)
- Chairman, National Committee for Chemistry Education in High Schools (2007–2009)

He also served on the editorial boards of:

- Journal of Physical Chemistry (Advisory Board, 2008–2011)
- Beilstein Journal of Nanotechnology (2011–2015)
- Physical Chemistry Chemical Physics (Advisory Board, 2011–2018; Associate Editor, 2018–2023)
- Chemical Physics Reviews (Editorial Advisory Board, 2020– )

== Awards ==
- Fellow of the Royal Society of Chemistry
- Fellow of the American Physical Society (2003)
- Lectureship Award, Colloid and Surface Chemistry Division, Chemical Society of Japan (2007)
- Taiwan Chemical Society Lectureship (2010)
- Outstanding Research Award, Israel Vacuum Society (2013)
- Kolthoff Prize, Technion – Israel Institute of Technology (2014)
- Outstanding Scientist Award, Israel Chemical Society (2018)
- Humboldt–Meitner Award (2019)
- Member of the Academia Europaea (2021)
- Van ’t Hoff Lectureship, Royal Netherlands Academy of Arts and Sciences (2022)
- Horizon Prize, Royal Society of Chemistry (2022)
- Gold Medal, Israel Chemical Society (2022)
- Chirality Medal (2023)

== Personal life ==
He is married to Dr. Rachel Mamlok-Naaman and is the father of four. He resides in Yarkona.

His cousin is Prof. Maya Shculdiner from the Weizmann Institute, who served as the chair of the institute's scientific council as well.

== Selected Publications ==
=== Articles ===
- C. Kulkarni, A. K. Mondal, T. Das, G. Grinbom, F. Tassinari, M. Mabesoone, E.W. Meijer, R. Naaman, Adv. Mater. 2020, 32, 1904965.
- S. Mishra, A. K. Mondal, E. Smolinsky, R. Naaman, K. Maeda,T. Nishimura, T. Taniguchi, T. Yoshida, K. Takayama, E. Yashima, Angew. Chem. 2020, 132, 14779 – 14784.
- A. K. Mondal, N. Brown, S. Mishra, P. Makam, D. Wing, S. Gilead, Y. Wiesenfeld, G. Leitus, L. J. W. Shimon, R. Carmieli, D. Ehre, G. Kamieniarz, J. Fransson, O. Hod, L. Kronik, E. Gazit, R. Naaman, ACS Nano. 2020, 14, 16624−16633.
- S. Mishra, A. K. Mondal, E. Smolinsky, R. Naaman, K. Maeda,T. Nishimura, T. Taniguchi, T. Yoshida, K. Takayama, E. Yashima, Angew. Chem. 2020, 132, 14779 – 14784.
- C. Kulkarni, A. Mondal, T. Das, G. Grinbom, F. Tassinari, M. Mabesoone, E.W. Meijer, R. Naaman, Adv. Mater. 2020, 32, 1904965.
- S. Mishra, A. K. Mondal, S. Pal, T. K. Das, E. Z. B. Smolinsky, G. Siligardi, R. Naaman, J. Phys. Chem. C. 2020, 124, 10776−10782.
- Das T. K., Tassinari F., Naaman R. & Fransson J. Journal of physical chemistry. C. 2022, 126, 6, 3257–3264.
- K. Banerjee-Ghosh, O. Ben Dor, F. Tassinari, E. Capua, S. Yochelis, A. Capua, S.-H. Yang, S. S. P. Parkin, S. Sarkar, L. Kronik, L. T. Baczewski, R. Naaman, Y. Paltiel, Science. 2018, 360, 1331–1334.
- F. Tassinari, J. Steidel, S. Paltiel, C. Fontanesi, M. Lahav, Y. Paltiel, R. Naaman, Chem. Sci., 2019, 10, 5246.
- K. Santra, Q. Zhang, F. Tassinari, R. Naaman, J. Phys. Chem. B. 2019, 123, 9443–9448.
- D. Bhowmick, Y. Sang, K. Santra, M. Halbauer, E. Capua, Y. Paltiel, R. Naaman & F. Tassinari. Crystal Growth & Design. 2021, 21, 5, 2925–2931.
- K. Santra, D. Bhowmick, Q. Zhu, T. Bendikov & R. Naaman. Journal of physical chemistry C. 2021, 125, 31, 17530–17536.
- K. Banerjee-Ghosh, S. Ghosh, H. Mazal, I. Riven, G. Haran, R. Naaman, J. Am. Chem. Soc. 2020, 142, 48, 20456-20462.

=== Books ===
- Ron Naaman, David N. Beratan, David Waldeck (Eds.), Electronic and Magnetic Properties of Chiral Molecules and Supramolecular Architectures, Springer, 2011.
- Ron Naaman, Zeev Vager (Eds.), The Structure of Small Molecules and Ions, Springer, 2012.
