= Nina Berova =

Professor of Chemistry

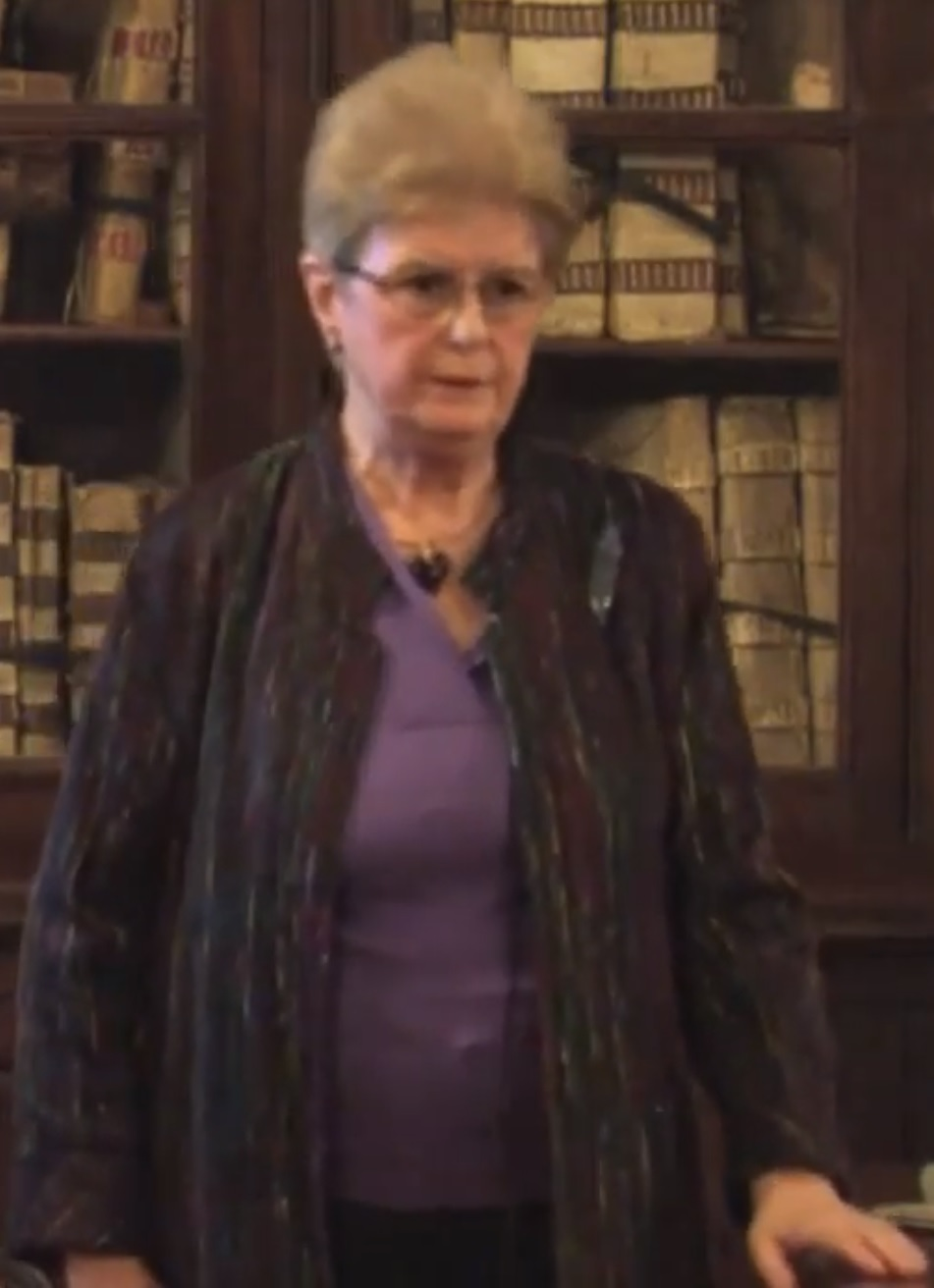
- Nina Berova speaks at the Scuola Normale Superiore in 2012
- Education: University of Sofia; Bulgarian Academy of Sciences; Ruhr University Bochum
- Awards: Chirality Medal
- Scientific career
- Workplaces: Columbia University; University of Sofia

Nina D. Berova is a Professor of Chemistry at Columbia University. She is recognised as a world leader in stereochemistry and chiroptical spectroscopy. Her contributions include the development of porphyrin tweezers. She was the 2007 winner of the Società Chimica Italiana Chirality Medal.

== Early life and education ==
Berova earned her PhD at the University of Sofia in 1972. She stayed working for the Bulgarian Academy of Sciences for her early career. During this time she worked on chiroptical spectroscopy at Ruhr University Bochum, where she worked under the supervision of Günther Snatzke.

== Research and career ==
She was made an Associate Professor in Organic Chemistry at Sofia University in 1982, and made a visiting professor at Columbia University in 1988. Soon after she became a Research Professor at Columbia University, working with Koji Nakanishi on chiroptical spectroscopy of natural products. Their work started with the examination of biopolymers using exciton chirality, including pectin classification and the determination of glycosidic bonds.

Berova was the first and only woman to win the Chirality Medal. Berova's citation reads "in recognition of her outstanding achievements in the field of chiroptical spectroscopy and the elucidation of a wide range of important chemical and biological problems related to molecular and supramolecular chirality". She has delivered short courses on chrioptical spectroscopies included Optical Rotatory Dispersion, Circular Dichroism and Raman Optical Activity. She was elected an honorary member of the Italian Chemical Society at the Scuola Normale Superiore di Pisa in 2012.

=== Selected publications ===
Her publications include;

- Berova, Nina (2000). Circular Dichroism: Principles and Applications. Wiley. ISBN 9780471330035.
- Berova, Nina (2012). Comprehensive Chiroptical Spectroscopy. Wiley. ISBN 9780470641354.
- Berova, Nina (2007). "Application of electronic circular dichroism in configurational and conformational analysis of organic compounds". Chemical Society Reviews. 36 (6): 914–31. doi:10.1039/b515476f. PMID 17534478.
- Berova, Nina (1993). "Physicochemical characterization of a ouabain isomer isolated from bovine hypothalamus". PNAS. 90 (17): 8189–8193. Bibcode:1993PNAS...90.8189T. doi:10.1073/pnas.90.17.8189. PMC 47314. PMID 8396262.

Berova has been Editor of the journal Chirality since 1998.

=== Awards and honours ===
Her awards and honours include;

- 2003 Italian Chemical Society Piero Pino Gold Medal
- 2005 American Chemical Society Editor Award
- 2007 Chirality Medal
- 2008 Honoured with Special Issue in Chirality
- 2009 University of Vigo Lifetime Recognition Award
- 2011 Honorary member of the Italian Chemical Society
