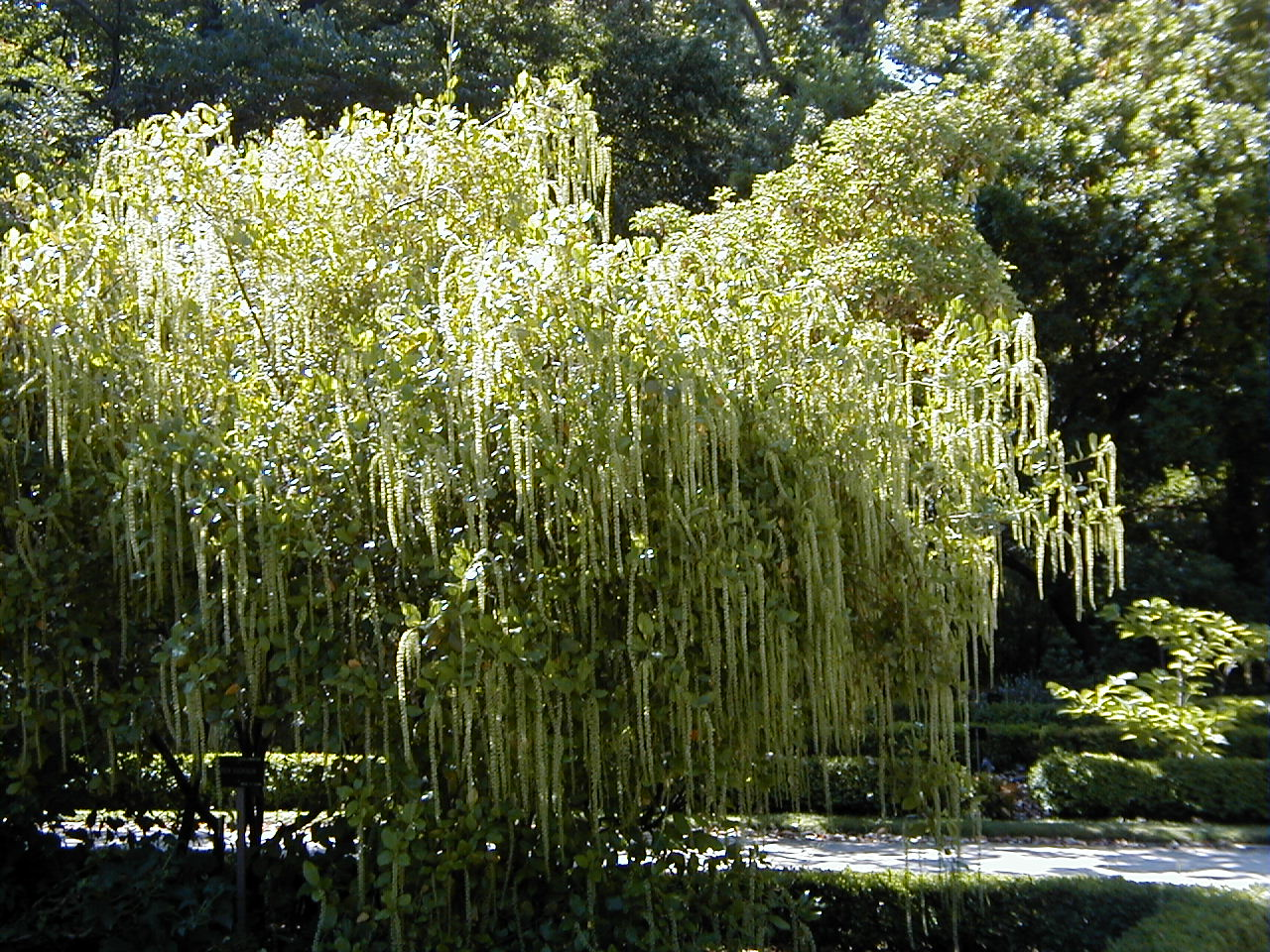
- I. ilicifolia, Real Jardín Botánico de Madrid

Scientific classification
- Kingdom: Plantae
- Clade: Tracheophytes
- Clade: Angiosperms
- Clade: Eudicots
- Order: Saxifragales
- Family: Iteaceae
- Genus: Itea
- Species: I. ilicifolia

Binomial name
- Itea ilicifolia Oliv.

= Itea ilicifolia =

Species of flowering plant

Itea ilicifolia, the holly-leaved sweet spire, is a species of flowering plant in the family Iteaceae, native to western China. It is an evergreen shrub growing to 3–5 m (10–16 ft) tall by 3 m (10 ft) broad, with glossy holly-like leaves and fragrant drooping racemes of greenish-white flowers, 30 cm (12 in) long, in summer and autumn. It is hardy, though young plants require protection from dry winds.

This plant has gained the Royal Horticultural Society's Award of Garden Merit.
