= Knidi =

Village in Western Macedonia, Greece

Knidi Κνίδη
- Community
- Location within Greece
- Coordinates: 40°5.8′N 21°35.5′E
- Country: Greece
- Administrative region: Western Macedonia
- Regional unit: Grevena
- Municipality: Grevena
- Municipal unit: Ventzio

Area
  - Community: 81.901 km^{2} (31.622 sq mi)
- Elevation: 647 m (2,123 ft)

Population (2021)
  - Community: 411
  - Density: 5.02/km^{2} (13.0/sq mi)
- Time zone: UTC+2 (EET)
  - Summer (DST): UTC+3 (EEST)
- Postal code: 511 00
- Area code: +30-2462
- Vehicle registration: PN

Knidi (Greek: Κνίδη, before 1927: Κόπριβα – Kopriva) is a village and a community of the Grevena municipality. Before the 2011 local government reform it was a part of the municipality of Ventzio, of which it was a municipal district and the seat. The 2021 census recorded 411 residents in the community. The community of Knidi covers an area of 81.901 km^{2}.

== Administrative division ==
The community of Knidi consists of five separate settlements:

- Itea (population 99 as of 2021)
- Knidi (population 180)
- Mikrokleisoura (population 24)
- Pistiko (population 29)
- Poros (population 79)

Former villages:

- Lagkadakia
- Palaioknidi
- Pefkaki

== See also ==
- List of settlements in the Grevena regional unit
