= Laurence D. Barron =

British chemist

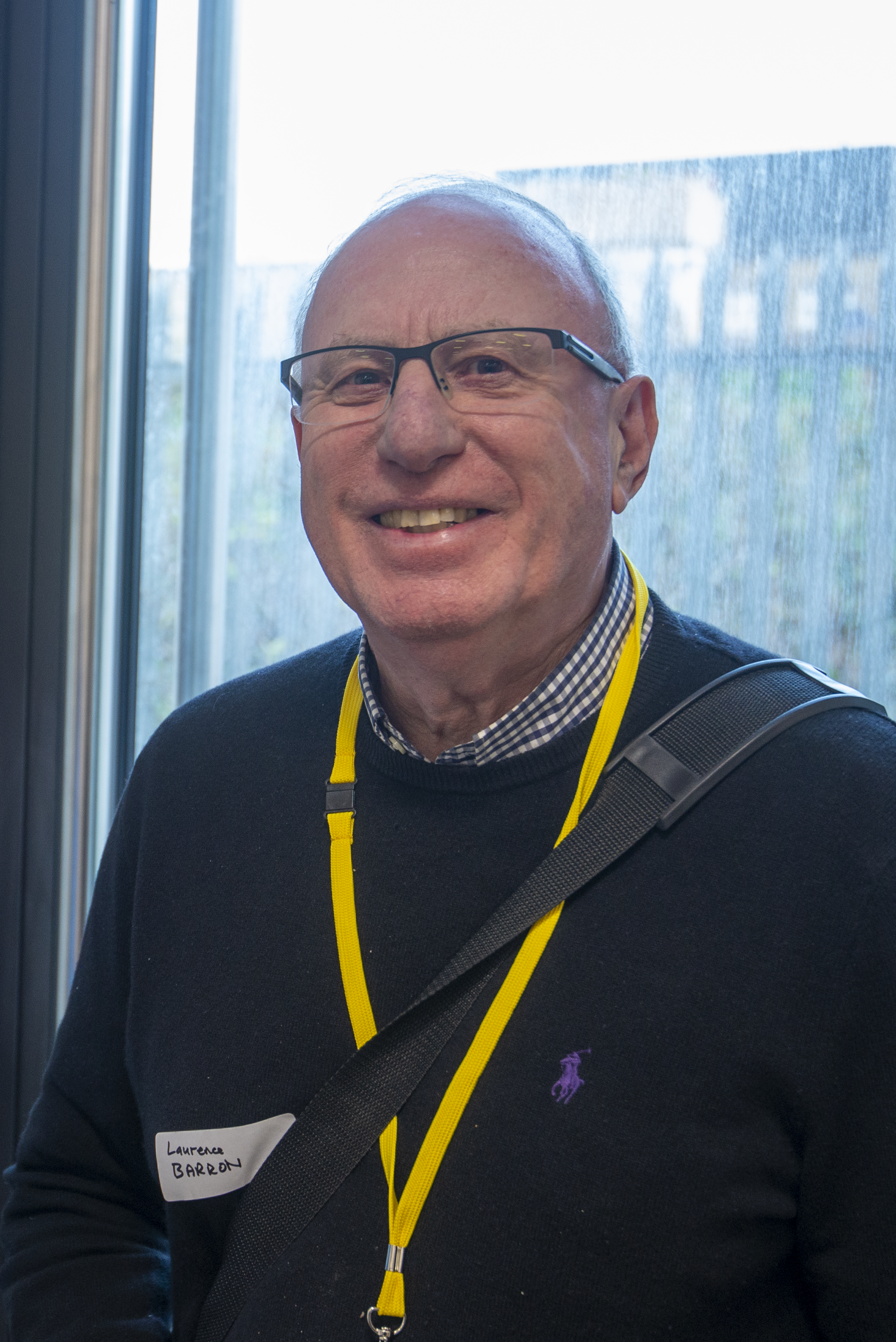
- Barron in 2019
- Born: 12 February 1944 (age 82); Southampton, England
- Citizenship: British
- Education: University of Oxford
- Known for: Raman optical activity
- Awards: Chirality Medal (2011)
- Scientific career
- Fields: Physical chemistry
- Workplaces: University of Glasgow
- Thesis: The Theory of Optical Birefringence (1969)
- Doctoral advisor: Peter Atkins
- Other academic advisors: A. David Buckingham

Laurence David Barron FRS, FRSE (born 12 February 1944 in Southampton, England) has been Gardiner Professor of Chemistry at the University of Glasgow since 1998 (now Emeritus). He is a chemist who has conducted research into the properties of chiral (right- or left-handed) molecules.

== Education ==
Laurence Barron attended King Edward VI School, Southampton and then studied chemistry at the Northern Polytechnic, where he earned a First Class Honours Degree of London University in 1965. He studied at Lincoln College, Oxford, with Peter Atkins earning a D.Phil. in 1969, on the theory of nonlinear optical activity and birefringence, and polarized light scattering generally.

== Research ==
Barron carried out post-doctoral research with A. David Buckingham, at Cambridge University, from 1969 to 1975, holding a Ramsay Memorial Fellowship in 1974–75. In 1975, he joined the Chemistry Department of the University of Glasgow, as a lecturer. He was promoted to reader in 1980 and became titular professor in 1984. From 1995 to 2000 he held an EPSRC Senior Fellowship. He has held the Gardiner Chair of Chemistry from 1998 to 2008. He is now an emeritus professor and honorary senior research fellow in chemistry. Barron is best known for his pioneering work on Raman optical activity, and was made a Fellow of the Royal Society on 26 May 2005.

The idea that would eventually lead to Raman optical activity appeared for the first time during Barron's D.Phil. research, when he discovered a new fundamental scattering process involving interference between light waves scattered via the molecular polarizability and optical activity tensors and which generates a small ellipticity/circularity in the scattered light. This was published with Peter Atkins in 1969. with the final definitive theory published with David Buckingham in 1971. The first observations, made in Buckingham's laboratory, were published in 1973, and constituted the first observations of the long-sought optical activity in vibrational transitions of chiral molecules. Barron developed his extension of Lord Kelvin's definition of chirality to include motion, first published in 1986, in order to critically assess external physical influences able to induce an enantiomeric excess in reactions that would otherwise produce a racemic product, something that had been controversial ever since the time of Louis Pasteur and had resulted in many futile experiments.

== Awards and recognition ==
- 2012, Zhang Dayu Memorial Lecture, CAS Dalian Institute of Chemical Physics, China
- 2012, Joshua Schechter Memorial Lecture, Bar Ilan University, Israel
- 2011, Chirality Medal, 2011
- 2008, Tetelman Visiting Fellow, Jonathan Edwards College, Yale University, USA
- 2005, Elected Fellow of the Royal Society of Chemistry, FRSC
- 2005, Elected Fellow of the Institute of Physics, FInstP
- 2005, Elected Fellow of the Royal Society., FRS
- 2003, visiting professor, Universite Paul Sabatier, Toulouse, France
- 1998, Chemical Society of Zürich Lecture
- 1997, Guest Review Lecture, Association of Physicians of Great Britain and Ireland
- 1995, EPSRC Senior Fellow (1995–2000)
- 1995, Visiting Miller Research Professor, University of California, Berkeley, USA
- 1993, Sir Harold Thompson Award for Molecular Spectroscopy
- 1992, Elected Fellow of the Royal Society of Edinburgh, FRSE
- 1987, F.L. Conover Memorial Lecture, Vanderbilt University, USA
- 1984, G.M.J. Schmidt Memorial Lecture, Weizmann Institute of Science, Israel.
- 1977, Corday–Morgan Medal and Prize.
