= Buckingham (unit) =

Unit of electric quadrupole moment

The buckingham (symbol: B) is a CGS unit of electric quadrupole, named in honour of the chemical physicist A. David Buckingham who was the first to measure a molecular quadrupole moment. It is defined as 10^{−26} statcoulomb-square centimetre. This is equivalent to 1 debye-angstrom, where 1 debye = 10^{−18} statcoulomb-centimetre is the CGS unit of molecular dipole moment and 1 angstrom = 10^{−8} cm.

One buckingham corresponds to the quadrupole moment resulting from two opposing dipole moments of equal magnitude of 1 debye that are separated by a distance of 1 angstrom, a typical bond length. This is analogous to the debye for the dipole moment of two opposing charges of 10^{−10} statcoulomb separated by 1 angstrom, and the name Buckingham for the unit was suggested by Peter Debye in 1963 in honour of Buckingham.
