= Debye =

CGS unit of electric dipole moment

The debye (/dɪˈbaɪ/ dib-EYE, Dutch: [dəˈbɛiə]; symbol: D) is a CGS unit (a non-SI metric unit) of electric dipole moment (Note: Two equal and opposite charges separated by some distance constitute an electric dipole. This dipole possesses an electric dipole moment whose value is given as charge times length of separation. The dipole itself is a vector whose direction coincides with the position vector of the positive charge with respect to the negative charge: p = qr.) named in honour of the physicist Peter J. W. Debye. Likely the earliest recommendation for the Debye as a unit was in the Physikalisch-chemisches Taschenbuch (physical chemistry handbook) written by Carl Drucker and Erich Proskauer in early 1932. It is defined as 10^{−18} statcoulomb-centimetres. (Note: The statcoulomb is also known as the franklin or electrostatic unit of charge. 1 statC = 1 Fr = 1 esu = 1 cm^{3/2}⋅g^{1/2}⋅s^{−1}.) Historically the debye was defined as the dipole moment resulting from two charges of opposite sign but an equal magnitude of 10^{−10} statcoulomb (Note: 10^{−10} statcoulomb corresponds to approximately 0.2083 units of elementary charge.) (generally called e.s.u. (electrostatic unit) in older scientific literature), which were separated by 1 ångström. (Note: The ångström is within an order of magnitude of the nuclear separation for a typical covalent bond. 1 Å = 100 pm = 10^{−8} cm = 10^{−10} m.) This gave a convenient unit for molecular dipole moments.

1 D	= 10^{−18} statC·cm
	= 10^{−18} cm^{5/2}⋅g^{1/2}⋅s^{−1} (Note: In any of the CGS systems, electromagnetic units are expressed in terms of the three base units, cm, g and s, albeit the systems are mutually inconsistent in this regard.)
	= 10^{−10} statC·Å
	≘ 1/299792458×10^{−21} C·m (Note: One debye corresponds to 10^{−21} C·m^{2}/s divided by the speed of light. Conversely, 1 C·m ≘ 2.9979×10^{29} D.)
	≈ 3.33564×10^{−30} C·m (Note: Also expressible as 3.33564 qC·m.)
	≈ 0.3934303 e·a_{0} (Note: The product e·a_{0} is also called the atomic unit of electric dipole moment (see Atomic unit of electric dipole moment, NIST.))
	≈ 0.2081943 e⋅Å
	≈ 0.02081943 e·nm

Typical dipole moments for simple diatomic molecules are in the range of 0 to 11 D. Molecules with symmetry point groups or containing inversion symmetry do not have a permanent dipole moment, while highly ionic molecular species have a very large dipole moment, e.g. gas-phase potassium bromide, KBr, with a dipole moment of 10.41 D. A proton and an electron 1 Å apart have a dipole moment of 4.8 D.

The debye is still used in atomic physics and chemistry because SI units have until recently been inconveniently large. The smallest SI unit of electric dipole moment is the quectocoulomb-metre, (Note: With a value of 10^{−30}, quecto- is the smallest SI prefix, accepted as an SI prefix by the CGPM on 18 November 2022.) which corresponds closely to 0.3 D.

== See also ==
- Buckingham (unit) (CGS unit of electric quadrupole)
