= Phil McCrea =

McCrea teaching photosynthesis in one of his Biology classes at New Trier.

Phil McCrea (1948–2016) was president of the National Association of Biology Teachers. He was a biology instructor who also published scholarly works, won the Illinois Outstanding Biology Teacher Award, and appeared on Oprah as an expert on household sanitation.

== Employment ==
McCrea was a biology teacher at New Trier High School in Northfield, Illinois and taught at The College of Lake County in Grayslake, Illinois and at McHenry County College in Crystal Lake, Illinois. He taught at New Trier starting in 1971, at College of Lake County since 1995, and at Mchenry Community College starting the summer of 2008. He won the outstanding part-time faculty award from the College of Lake County in 2006. At New Trier, he was a sponsor of the Biology Club as well as the Biology Coach for Science Olympiad.

== Educational background ==
McCrea received his bachelor's degree in Science in 1970 and his master's degree in Behavioral Genetics in 1974, both from University of Illinois Chicago.

== Awards and honors ==
McCrea was the President of the National Association of Biology Teachers in 2000. He was also the Executive secretary and Treasurer of the Illinois Association of Biology Teachers since 1981 In 1980 he won the Outstanding Biology Teacher Award for Illinois. Furthermore, he was a member of the Council of Scientific Society Presidents from 1999 to 2001.

== Oprah ==
McCrea appeared on The Oprah Winfrey Show in 1997. He was invited as a biologist to comment about household sanitation issues. The theme of the episode was "Things to Get Rid Of." He commented on items such as mascara brushes and makeup sponges that were a breeding ground for bacteria.

== Other interests ==
McCrea was also an accomplished folk-style guitar player, and had a deep soothing voice with which he sang songs about evolution and DNA to his classes. He had a talent for making art as well and designed a spa-like window for his home and tile designs on his kitchen floor. He also enjoyed working in wood, cutting and painting yard ornaments, and highlighting displays of furniture and appliances.
