= Daniel W. Armstrong =

American chemist and academic

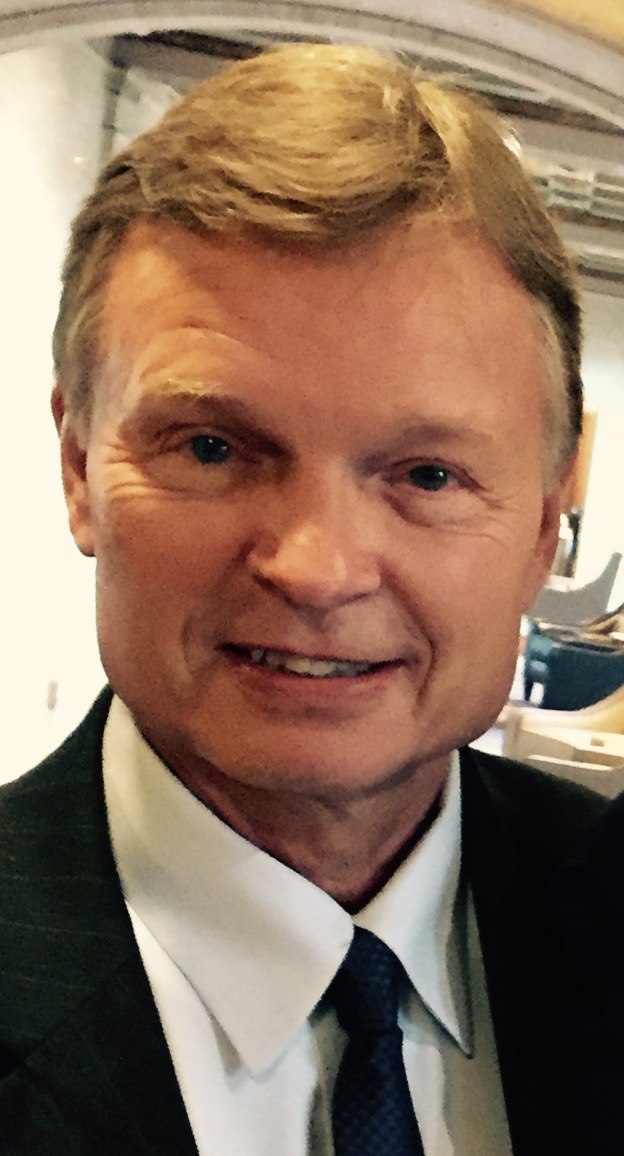
- Daniel Armstrong in 2015
- Education: Texas A&M University
- Awards: Chirality Medal
- Scientific career
- Fields: Analytical Chemistry

Daniel Wayne Armstrong is an American chemist who specializes in separation science, chiral molecular recognition, bioanalytic analysis, mass spectrometry and colloid chemistry. He is the Robert A. Welch Distinguished Professor at the University of Texas at Arlington. He has authored ~ 750 publications including 35 book chapters, a book, and holds over 35 patents on separation technologies. He was an associate editor for the prestigious American Chemical Society journal Analytical Chemistry. He is a fellow of the American Chemical Society, Royal Chemical Society (UK), and the National Academy of Inventors. Armstrong has given over 560 invited seminars worldwide at international conferences, universities and corporations. His research and patents formed the basis for two companies: Advanced Separation Technologies, Inc; which was acquires by Sigma-Aldrich Corporation in 2006 and AZYP, LLC in Arlington, TX. His published work has been cited over 50,000 times and his h-index is 115. He is believed to have mentored more graduate level analytical chemists than any living scientist.

== Biography ==
Daniel W. Armstrong was born in 1949 to Robert E. Armstrong, an educator and mayor of Fort Wayne, IN and Nila L. Armstrong. He was the oldest of their three sons. As an undergraduate student, he played collegiate football and track & field. He is married to Linda M. Armstrong and they have three children.

== Early career ==
Armstrong received his B.S. from Washington and Lee University. He received M.S. in oceanography and Ph.D. in bio-organic chemistry from Texas A&M University. Armstrong began his career at Bowdoin College as an assistant professor in 1978 and moved to Georgetown University in 1980, followed by Texas Tech University and then the University of Missouri Rolla as a curator's distinguished professor. Later he joined Iowa State University in 2000 as the first Caldwell Distinguished Professor. He joined University of Texas at Arlington in 2006 as the Robert A. Welch Distinguished Professor, where he currently leads a research group in diverse areas of chiral molecular recognitions, ionic liquids, separation mechanism and theory, ultra-fast analysis, D-amino acid and peptide analysis and gas and liquid chromatography instrumentation and detectors.

== Awards and recognition ==
- Elected as a member of the Chemistry Honor Society, Phi Lambda Upsilon (PLU), 1975, Texas A&M University
- Who's Who, Who's Who in the South and Southwest
- Personalities of America
- Personalities of the South
- American Men and Women of Science
- Directory of World Researchers
- Who's Who in the Midwest
- 1985 - Teaching Excellence Award from the "Arts and Sciences Council" of Texas Tech University
- 1988 - Faculty Excellence Award, University of Missouri-Rolla, 1988.
- 1988-1994 Teaching Excellence Award, University of Missouri-Rolla
- 1989 - Curators' Distinguished Professorship
- 1990 - EAS Award for Outstanding Achievements in the Fields of Chromatography
- 1991 - Great Britain’s Martin Medal in recognition of outstanding contributions to Chromatography.
- 1992 - ISCO Lectureship Award for Significant Contributions to Instrumentation for Biochemical Separations.
- 1993 - 49th American Chemical Society Midwest Regional Award.
- 1993 - Presidential Award for Research and Creativity.
- 1994 - Publication entitled "Evaluation of the Macrocyclic Antibiotic Vancomycin as a Chiral Selector for Capillary Electrophoresis" received a 1994 Perkin-Elmer Award for Excellence in Capillary Electrophoresis.
- 1995 - R&D 100 Award.
- 1995 - American Association of Pharmaceutical Scientists Fellow Award.
- 1996 - The American Microchemical Societies’ A. A. Benedette-Pichler Award.
- 1997 - Karen Morehouse Best Paper Award” presented by the 12th Annual Conference on Hazardous Waste Research.
- 1998 - American Chemical Society - Helen M. Free Award for Public Outreach.
- 1999 - American Chemical Society Award in Chromatography.
- 1999 - Distinguish Scholar, Hope College/Park Davis.
- 2000 - Caldwell Chair, Iowa State University.
- 2001 - Chicagoland Chromatography Discussion Group (CCDG) Merit Award
- 2001 - Weber Medal for Contributions to Pharmaceutical Science
- 2001 - Honorary Member of the Societatis Pharmaceuticae Slovacae
- 2002 - Welch Lectureship speaker, Texas A&M University
- 2002 - Kenneth A. Spencer Award for Meritorious Contributions to Agricultural and Food Chemistry.
- 2003- Dow Lectureship in Chemistry, University of British Columbia
- 2003- IAP Lectureship, Columbia University, NY
- 2003- Chirality Medal, Shizuoka, Japan
- 2004 - Vladimir J. Zuffa Medal for Pharmaceutical Chemistry
- 2005 - Dal Nogare Award for Separation Science
- 2006 - R. A. Welch Chair, University of Texas at Arlington
- 2007 - Medal of the Slovak Medical Society
- 2009 - Admitted as a Fellow of The Royal Society of Chemistry
- 2012 - UTA Distinguished Record of Research or Creative Activity
- 2013 - Named American Chemical Society Fellow, 2013.
- 2014 - ACS Award for Separation Science & Technology
- 2014 - M.J.E. Golay Award.
- 2014 - Elected a Fellow of National Academy of Inventors
- 2014 - UT Arlington Distinguished Scholars Award
- 2014 - Inducted to the UTA Academy of Distinguished Scholars
- 2015 - Named to the Analytical Scientist’s 2015 Power List Top 10
- 2015 - Wilfred T. Doherty Research & Service Award – DFW Section of American Chemical Society
- 2017 - Named to the Analytical Scientist's 2017 Power List Top 10
- 2018 - Received Dow Chemical WesTEC Award for "Distinguished Leader in Science and Technology"
- 2018 - Granted a Doctor Honoris Causa Degree from Slovak University of Technology
- 2018 - UT Arlington Excellence in Teaching Award
- 2019 - Named to the Analytical Scientist's 2019 Power List Top 20
- 2020 - LCGC Lifetime Achievement Award
