= A. David Buckingham =

Australian chemist and cricketer (1930–2021)

A. David Buckingham CBE, FRS
- Born: 28 January 1930; Sydney, Australia
- Died: 4 February 2021 (aged 91); Cambridge, England
- Education: Cambridge University
- Known for: Theory of electric, magnetic and optical properties of molecules Theory of intermolecular forces
- Spouse: Jillian Bowles
- Children: 3
- Awards: Ahmed Zewail Prize in Molecular Sciences (2006)
- Scientific career
- Fields: Theoretical chemistry Chemical physics
- Workplaces: Oxford University; University of Bristol; Cambridge University
- Doctoral advisor: John Pople
- Notable students: Laurence D. Barron; Brian Orr

Amyand David Buckingham CBE FRS FAA (28 January 1930 in Pymble, New South Wales – 4 February 2021) was an Australian chemist, with primary expertise in chemical physics.

== Life and career ==
David Buckingham attended Barker College in Sydney. He then obtained a Bachelor of Science and Master of Science, under Professor Raymond Le Fevre, from the University of Sydney and a PhD from the University of Cambridge supervised by John Pople. He was an 1851 Exhibition Senior Student in the Physical Chemistry Laboratory at the University of Oxford from 1955 to 1957, Lecturer and then Student (Fellow) at Christ Church, Oxford from 1955 to 1965 and University Lecturer in the Inorganic Chemistry Laboratory from 1958 to 1965. He was Professor of Theoretical Chemistry at the University of Bristol from 1965 to 1969. He was appointed Professor of Chemistry at the University of Cambridge in 1969.

He was elected a Fellow of the Royal Society in 1975, a Fellow of the American Physical Society in 1986 and a Foreign Associate of the United States National Academy of Sciences in 1992. He was a member of the International Academy of Quantum Molecular Science. Buckingham was elected to the Australian Academy of Science in 2008 as a Corresponding Fellow.

He was awarded the first Ahmed Zewail Prize in Molecular Sciences for pioneering contributions to the molecular sciences in 2006.

He won the Harrie Massey Medal and Prize in 1995.

He also played 10 first class cricket matches for Cambridge University and Free Foresters between 1955 and 1960, scoring 349 runs including two half-centuries at an average of 18.36. He was President of Cambridge University Cricket Club between 1990 and 2009.

Professor Buckingham finished his career as Emeritus Professor of Chemistry at the University of Cambridge, United Kingdom and Emeritus Fellow at Pembroke College, Cambridge.

== Scientific contributions ==
Professor Buckingham's research has focussed on the measurement and understanding of the electric, magnetic and optical properties of molecules; as well as on the theory of intermolecular forces.

Initially he worked on dielectric properties of liquids, such as dipole moments of molecules in both solution and gas phases. He developed the theory of the interaction of molecules in liquids and gases with external electric and magnetic fields. In 1959, he proposed a direct method of measurement of molecular quadrupole moments of molecules (measured in buckinghams), which he demonstrated experimentally in 1963 on the carbon dioxide molecule. In 1960, he developed theories of solvent effects on nuclear magnetic resonance (NMR) spectra and vibrational spectra of molecules. In 1962 he considered the effect on NMR spectra of molecular orientation in a strong electric field, and developed a method to determine the absolute sign of the spin-spin coupling constant. In 1968, he determined the first accurate values of hyperpolarizability using the Kerr effect. In 1971 Buckingham and Laurence Barron pioneered the study of Raman optical activity, due to differences in the Raman scattering of left and right-polarized light by chiral molecules.

In the 1980s, he showed the importance of long-range intermolecular forces in determining the structure and properties of small molecule clusters, with particular applications in biological macromolecules. In 1990 he predicted the linear effect of an electric field on the reflection of light at interfaces. In 1995, he proved that the sum of the rotational strengths of all vibrational transitions from the ground state of a chiral molecule is zero.

== Personal life ==
In July 1964, David Buckingham sailed from Southampton to Montréal, to take up a research post in Ottawa. On the voyage he met Jillian Bowles, a physiotherapist who was heading to a post in British Columbia. They were engaged in January 1965 and married at Christ Church Cathedral, Oxford six months later. They were married for over 55 years, and had three children: Lucy Elliot and Mark Vincent, born in Bristol, and Alice Susan born in Cambridge. Between them they had eight grandchildren: Carola, Peter, Oliver, William, Patrick, Anna, Samuel and Maeve.

David Buckingham died in Cambridge on 4 February 2021, seven days after his 91st birthday; he was survived by Jill, their children and grandchildren.

== See also ==
- Buckingham (unit)
