= Exarchos, Grevena =

Exarchos Έξαρχος
- Community
- Location within Greece
- Coordinates: 40°9.6′N 21°37.9′E
- Country: Greece
- Administrative region: Western Macedonia
- Regional unit: Grevena
- Municipality: Grevena
- Municipal unit: Ventzio

Area
  - Community: 55.552 km^{2} (21.449 sq mi)
- Elevation: 733 m (2,405 ft)

Population (2021)
  - Community: 74
  - Density: 1.3/km^{2} (3.5/sq mi)
- Time zone: UTC+2 (EET)
  - Summer (DST): UTC+3 (EEST)
- Postal code: 511 00
- Area code: +30-2462
- Vehicle registration: PN

Exarchos (Greek: Έξαρχος) is a village and a community of the Grevena municipality. Before the 2011 local government reform it was a part of the municipality of Ventzio, of which it was a municipal district. The 2021 census recorded 74 residents in the community. The community of Exarchos covers an area of 55.552 km^{2}.

== Administrative division ==
The community of Exarchos consists of two separate settlements:

- Exarchos (population 37 as of 2021)
- Varis (population 37)

== See also ==
- List of settlements in the Grevena regional unit
