= Chemistry Teacher International =

Peer-reviewed academic journal

- Discipline: Chemistry education
- Language: English
- Edited by: Mustafa Sözbilir

Publication details
- History: 2019–present
- Publisher: De Gruyter
- Frequency: Quarterly
- Open access: Yes
- License: CC BY-NC-ND 4.0
- Impact factor: 1.5 (2022)

Standard abbreviations
- ISO 4: Chem. Teach. Int.

Indexing
- ISSN: 2569-3263
- LCCN: 2020207548
- OCLC no.: 1076708322

Links
- Journal homepage; Online access; Online archive

Chemistry Teacher International is a quarterly open-access peer-reviewed chemistry journal published by De Gruyter. The editor-in-chief is Mustafa Sözbilir (Atatürk University). It was established in 2019 by the International Union of Pure and Applied Chemistry's Committee on Chemistry Education, following the identification of a distinct lack of published papers on good practices in chemistry education by Marcy Towns and Adam Craft in 2012 and Keith Taber in 2016. The founding editor-in-chief was Jan Apotheker (University of Groningen).

The journal covers good practices in secondary education, especially those that would normally be published in national teacher journals and not international publications.

== Abstracting and indexing ==
The journal is abstracted and indexed in:

- Directory of Open Access Journals
- EBSCO databases
- Emerging Sources Citation Index
- Scopus

According to the Journal Citation Reports, the journal has a 2022 impact factor of 1.5.
