= Emanuel Gil-Av =

Russian-Israeli chemist

Emanuel Gil-Av (Zimkin)
- עמנואל גיל-אב
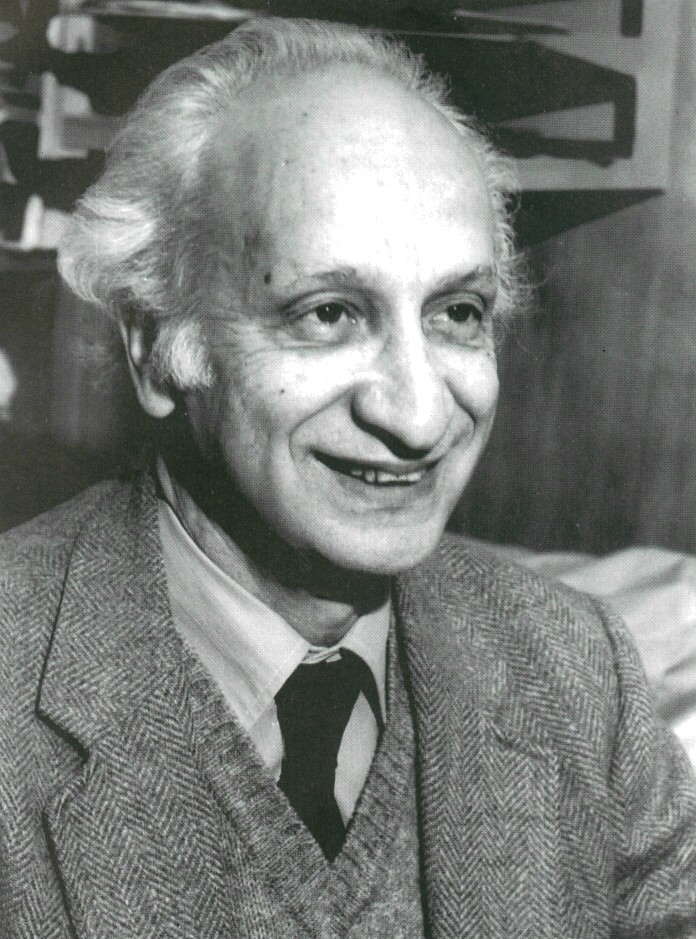
- Born: 7 August 1916; Pensa, Russia
- Died: 24 March 1996 (aged 79); Rehovot, Israel
- Citizenship: Israeli
- Education: University of Strasbourg
- Known for: Chromatographic separation of enantiomers
- Awards: Chirality Medal
- Scientific career
- Fields: Analytical chemistry
- Workplaces: Weizmann Institute of Science
- Doctoral advisor: Ernst David Bergmann

Emanuel Gil-Av (Zimkin) (Hebrew: עמנואל גיל-אב; 7 August 1916 – 24 March 1996) was an Israeli chemist. The main emphasis of his work constituted chiral chromatography for the analytical separation of enantiomers.

== Life and work ==
Emanuel Gil-Av was born 1916 in Pensa of Tzarist Russia. After the death of his father, a physician, the family moved first to Central Europe and in 1928 to Tel-Aviv, Israel, where Gil-Av attended High School. Gil-Av studied petroleum chemistry at the University of Strasbourg. In 1940 he escaped the German occupation to England where he worked at first in the chemical laboratory of Chaim Weizmann, followed by the Petrochemical Ltd. in Manchester. After World War II, he moved to Palestine and he joined the Daniel Sieff Institute in Rehovot which was later on to become the Weizmann Institute of Science. In 1951 he earned his PhD under the supervision of Ernst David Bergmann.

In his study of oil shale deposits, Gil-Av developed complex-forming stationary phases employing silver(I) ions for selective olefin separations by gas chromatography (GC). In co-operation with the centre of peptide chemistry at the Weizmann Institute of Science, he developed methods of the gas-chromatographic resolution of racemic α-amino acids. By coating a glass capillary column with the chiral stationary phase (CSP) N-trifluoroacetyl-L-isoleucine lauryl ester, Gil-Av et al. carried out in 1966 the first gas-chromatographic enantioseparation of racemic amino acids as N-trifluoroacetyl-O-alkyl derivatives. Many racemic compounds, amenable for enantioselective interaction via hydrogen bonding with the CSP, could be analytically enantioseparated by GC.

Further contributions of Gil-Av and associates are concerned with the use of chiral mobile phase additives (CMPAs) in liquid chromatography (LC), enantiomeric separation of helicenes by supramolecular LC, the temperature-dependent reversal of enantioselectivity by enthalpy-entropy compensation and non-linear effects leading to enantiomeric enrichment during chromatography on achiral stationary phases.

== Literature ==
- Emanuel Gil-Av, Present status of enantiomeric analysis by gas chromatography, J. Mol. Evol. 6 (1975) 131–144.
- Nelu Grinberg: Emanuel Gil-Av (1916–1996): A man with a legacy, In: Chirality, 1998;10(5):372.
- Volker Schurig: In Memoriam – Emanuel Gil-Av. In: Journal of High Resolution Chromatography 19 (1996) 462.
- Volker Schurig: On the Centenary of Emanuel Gil-Av, Former Professor of the Weizmann Institute of Science and Pioneer of Enantioselective Chromatography, Isr. J. Chem. 56 (2016) 890–906.
