= Jeanne Crassous =

French chemist

- Born: Jeanne Costante
- Education: Ecole Normale Supérieure de Lyon
- Scientific career
- Workplaces: ETH Zürich; Ecole Normale Supérieure de Lyon; Institut des Sciences Chimiques de Rennes
- Thesis: Synthèse des énantiomères du bromochlorofluorométhane et détermination de leur configuration absolue par modélisation moléculaire et activité optique Raman (1996)

Jeanne Crassous is a French chemist who is a Professor and Director of Research at the French National Centre for Scientific Research (CNRS). She leads the Marie Skłodowska-Curie Actions International Training Network HEL4CHIROLED.

== Early life and education ==
Crassous completed her undergraduate studies at the Ecole Normale Supérieure de Lyon. She remained there for her doctoral research, where she worked with André Collet. Her doctoral research involved investigations into the absolute configuration of bromochlorofluoromethane, which she investigated using Raman optical activity. After earning her doctorate, Crassous moved to ETH Zurich, where she joined the research group of François Diederich investigating the chirality of fullerenes.

== Research and career ==
Crassous investigates π-conjugated chiral systems. She returned to École normale supérieure de Lyon in 1998, where she worked with Laure Guy and Jean-Pierre Dutasta optical properties of chiral molecules. In 2005, she moved to the Institut des Sciences Chimiques de Rennes, where she joined the research group of Régis Réau. Crassous was made Director of Research at the French National Centre for Scientific Research (CNRS) in 2010.

At the CNRS, Crassous leads the research programme CHIRAFUN, in which research teams investigate the molecular and supramolecular chirality of chiral materials. She has investigated the stereochemistry of a range of small molecules, including fullerenes, helicenes and organometallic complexes. In 2020 Crassous became the coordinator of HEL4CHIROLED, a collaborative international programme that looks to develop efficient organic light-emitting diodes from chiral materials.

Crassous serves on the editorial board of the Wiley journal Chirality.

== Awards and honours ==
- 2013 Distinguished member of the Société chimique de France
- 2020 Société chimique de France Prix de la Division de Chimie Organique

== Selected publications ==
- Jeanne Crassous (14 January 2009). "Chiral transfer in coordination complexes: towards molecular materials". Chemical Society Reviews. 38 (3): 830–845. doi:10.1039/b806203j. ISSN 0306-0012. PMID 19322474. Wikidata Q37423903.
- Nidal Saleh; Chengshuo Shen; Jeanne Crassous (24 June 2014). "Helicene-based transition metal complexes: synthesis, properties and applications". Chemical Science. 5 (10): 3680. doi:10.1039/c4sc01404a. ISSN 2041-6520. Wikidata Q60245882.
- Roland Kessinger; Jeanne Crassous; Andreas Herrmann; Markus Rüttimann; Luis Echegoyen; François Diederich (3 August 1998). "Preparation of Enantiomerically Pure C76 with a General Electrochemical Method for the Removal of Di(alkoxycarbonyl)methano Bridges from Methanofullerenes: The Retro-Bingel Reaction". Angewandte Chemie. 37 (13–14): 1919–1922. doi:10.1002/(sici)1521-3773(19980803)37:13/14<1919::aid-anie1919>3.0.co;2-x. ISSN 0044-8249. Wikidata Q29013621.
