= William E. Warner =

American industrial arts professor (1897–1971)

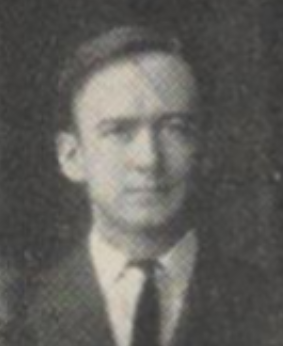
- William E. Warner, 1924
- Born: William Everett Warner; August 22, 1897; Roanoke, Illinois, US
- Died: July 12, 1971 (aged 73); Columbus, Ohio, US
- Occupation: Professor of industrial arts
- Known for: Founder of Epsilon Pi Tau and International Technology and Engineering Educators Association

Academic background
- Education: Platteville Normal School, 1917 University of Wisconsin, B.A. 1923 and MS 1924 Teachers College, Columbia University, Ph.D. 1928
- Thesis: The Control of the Continuation School

Academic work
- Discipline: Industrial arts education
- Institutions: Ohio State University

William Everett Warner (August 22, 1897 – July 12, 1971) was an American academic, organization founder, and one of the "great leaders" and pioneers of the industrial arts education profession, now known as technology education. He was the founder of Epsilon Pi Tau honorary society and the American Industrial Arts Association (now the International Technology and Engineering Educators Association).

== Early life and education ==
Warner was born in Roanoke, Illinois on August 22, 1897. His parents were Eva (née Redmon) and Isaac Newton Warner, a teacher, and principal. He was the oldest of three children, who later became teachers. His family moved to Elign, Illinois, followed by Normal, Illinois. In the spring of 1908, the family moved to Chicago where his father was enrolled in the University of Chicago. Waner attended the Woodlawn School in Chicago.

After Isaac Warner completed his bachelor's degree in 1910, he became the professor of teacher education at the Platteville Normal School in Platteville, Wisconsin. Warner, who was thirteen years old, was educated at the Normal High School. He was most interested in manual training and woodworking, and his goal was to be able to teach manual training. During the summer, he worked as a farmhand, mowed grass, and ran a crusher at a local quarry. While in school he worked as a bookkeeper for a local mine. His earnings helped support his family who was still paying off his father's college loan. However, he was also able to purchase clothes and alto horn. When John Philip Sousa played in Plattville, he hired Warner to play with the Sousa Band.

Warner graduated from Platteville Normal School in 1917. His first teaching position was at a high school in Lodi, Wisconsin. Unhappy in Lodi, he moved to Stevens Point, Wisonin the next year. He was drafted for service in World War I, attending officers training in Waco, Texas. After the war, he returned to teaching and was eventually the assistant principal at a vocational school in Wausau, Wisconsin. However, he resigned when the Smith–Hughes Act for vocational education passed, saying that "he could not work under the narrow accommodations of the act".

Warner enrolled in the University of Wisconsin, earning a B.A. in 1923 and a MS in 1924. His thesis was The Control of the Continuation School. While at Wisconsin, he was a member of the Arts and Crafts Club and Square and Compass, an organization for Master Masons. He paid for his tuition by playing his alto horn.

Warner then attended the Teachers College, Columbia University where he received his Ph.D. in 1928. At the time, Columbia was the top graduate school in education in the United States. Warnet studied under Frederick Gordon Bonser, along with John Dewey, Ira S. Griffth, Lois Mossman, Charles R. Richards, V. M. Russel, James E. Russell, David Snedden, and William H. Varnum. Warner incorporated industrial arts with his studies; he claimed to be the first person to receive an advanced degree in industrial arts in the United States.

== Career ==
Warner became an assistant professor of industrial arts education at Ohio State University in 1925. That same year, he established the graduate program in industrial arts at Ohio State. Students came to the program from across the county. In 1929, he established the American Security Research Foundation. He served as its first chairman. He also developed a "laboratory of industries" that was installed in county schools in Ohio before World War II, first as an experiment and later as a standard in the field of industrial arts. Many schools added new buildings to accommodate a new industrial arts laboratory.

Warner founded Epsilon Pi Tau honorary society at Ohio State University in 1929. The organization spread to include more than 125 chapters in North America and the Philippines. He served as its executive secretary for over forty years.

He directed The Terminologial Investigation of Professional and Scientific Terms in Vocational and Practical Arts Education from 1929 to 1933. This was a project of the Western Arts Association and defined terminology used by educators and in the field of industrial arts. He was also president of the Western Arts Association from 1932 and 1937.

He published the influential work, Terminological Investigation, in 1933. In this book and other work, Warner is credited with developing a new curriculum and adding the word "technology" to the industrial arts profession. In 1934, he was chairman of the committee that published A Prospectus for Industrial Arts in Ohio. He was promoted to full professor in 1939. Warner established the American Industrial Arts Association (now the International Technology and Engineering Educators Association) during the 10th anniversary celebration of Epsilon Pi Tau in 1939. He was the association's first president.

During World War II, he rose to the rank of lieutenant colonel, was a member of General Eisenhower's staff in Versailles and London, and received a Purple Heart. After the war, he returned to Ohio State where he spent the rest of his career, However, from 1950 to 1953, he took a leave of absence to be the executive director of The Civil Defense in Ohio.

Warner was influential in the formation of the National Council on Industrial Arts Teacher Education. He was the first editor of Industrial Arts Teacher. He lectured at more than 100 colleges across the United States and abroad and helped develop industrial arts programs in elementary, secondary, and post-secondary schools. He became a professor emeritus of Ohio State in 1967. For his many accomplishments in the field, Warner is considered one of the "great leaders" of the industrial arts profession.

== Honors ==
Epsilon Pi Tau named The William E. Warners Awards Program in his honor. Warner's papers are archived at Kent State University.

== Personal life ==
On August 14, 1920, Warner married Ellen E. Tood of Stevens Point in Chicago. She taught elementary school and supported their household while he was in graduate school. After they moved to Columbus, Ellen Warner was recognized as an expert in special education for children and served on the University Bureau of Educational Research. The couple celebrated their 50th wedding anniversary in August 1970.

Warner was a member of the American Legion, the Army and Navy Club of New York, the Newcomen Society of England, and the Rotary.

Warner died in Columbus, Ohio on July 12, 1971. His funeral services were held in Columbus and he was buried in the Forest Home Cemetery in Stevens Point.

== Selected publications ==
- Reconstruction of Industrial Arts Courses, with David Snedden. New York City: Bureau of Publications, Teachers College, Columbia University, 1927.
- Policies in Industrial Arts Education: Their Application to a Program for Preparing Teachers. Columbus: The Ohio State University Press, 1928
- A Directory of Industrial Arts Teacher Education Programs And Personnel in the United States. Newark, N.J.: American Industrial Arts Association, 1941.
- International Impact of Technology On Education: Some Impressions of Progress In Eighteen Nations. Columbus: Epsilon Pi Tau, inc., 1963.
