= Chirality-induced spin selectivity =

Aspect of electron emission of a compound

Chirality-induced spin selectivity (CISS) refers to multiple phenomena where the chirality of a chemical compound influences the spin of transmitted or emitted electrons. This effect was discovered by Ron Naaman and co-workers.

Experiments were able to demonstrate the effect in the form of polarization of electrons scattered from chiral molecules, spin-dependent transmission probabilities through layers of chiral molecules, spin-selectivity of electron-transport in a chiral medium and enantio-selectivity in chemical reactions induced by spin-polarized electrons.

Theoretical models were able to qualitatively explain the effect using spin-orbit coupling (SOC). But quantitatively, the predicted effect was always orders of magnitude smaller than what was measured in experiments. Whilst mechanism underlying CISS is not completely understood, a hybrid method comprising a film of pure gold with chiral molecules on it has produced results on par with the magnetic method.

In 2025, Huang et al. reported voltage-controlled interfacial chirality in an otherwise achiral molybdenum disulfide surface by using an electric double-layer transistor with enantiopure ionic liquids; the induced state was detected through CISS and the electrical magnetochiral effect.
