= John Penick =

American professor (born 1944)

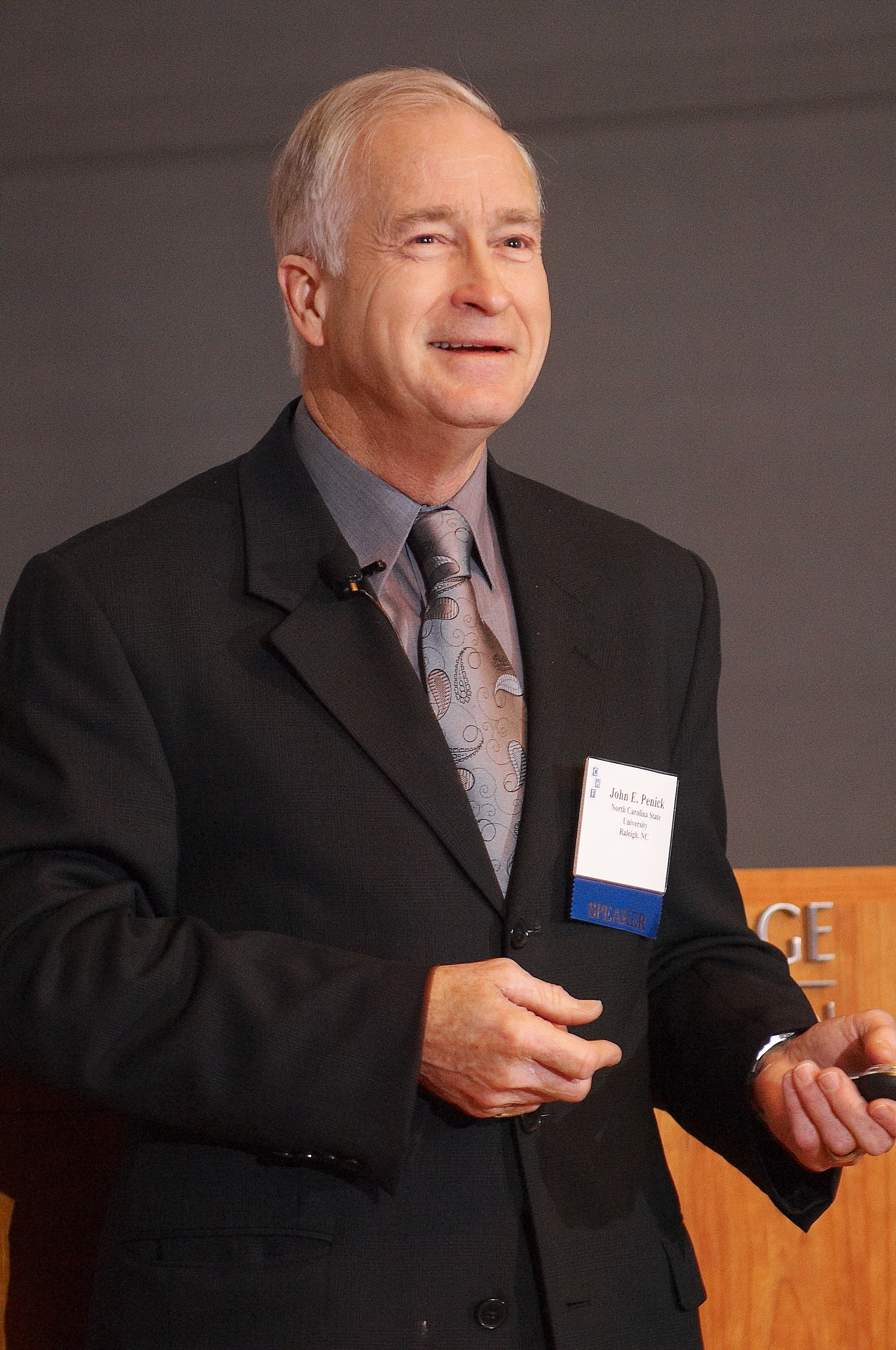
John Penick at Chemical Heritage Lecture, 2007

John E. Penick (born 1944) is an American professor of science education who has taught in high schools, community college, and at several universities in the United States and abroad. Author of more than 200 articles in professional journals and 40 books and monographs, Penick is best known for promoting innovative programs and processes for enhancing undergraduate teacher education. Many of his innovations were based on his studies of exemplary teachers in the United States, studies that focused on determining the roles of effective teachers.

In addition to his work with undergraduates, Penick has conducted workshops and presentations for teachers in almost every state of the U.S., speaking about and demonstrating how research can inform teacher practice and conditions. Widening his scope, Penick has worked extensively with a variety of international universities, ministries of education, and organizations in 35 countries.

== Education ==
Penick received his B.S. in zoology and chemistry (1966) and his M.A. in biology education (1969) from the University of Miami. He received his Ph.D. in Science Education from Florida State University in 1973. At Florida State he was mentored by Professor Dorothy M. Schlitt, known for her innovative ideas related to science teacher education. At Florida State, Penick was also significantly influenced by Professors Charles Matthews and Ron Good. While at Florida State Penick met fellow student James A. Shymansky, with whom he would continue to work for many years.

== Professional career ==
Following his graduation in 1973, Penick became assistant professor at Loyola University of Chicago, where he taught and was Director of Teacher Education in his second year. In 1975 Penick left Loyola for the University of Iowa, where his classmate, James A. Shymansky, had been for two years. At Iowa, Penick was promoted to Associate Professor (1977) and Professor (1982) and eventually was named Department Chair (1982). While at Iowa, Penick worked closely with Vincent Lunetta in developing and expanding a preservice science teacher education program, initially funded by the National Science Foundation, called Iowa UPSTEP. During Penick's years at the University of Iowa, the department of science education was noted as being large, dynamic, and highly productive of scholarly publications and outstanding students at every level. In 1985 he was a senior Fulbright Scholar at the University of Lisbon (Portugal) and The Technion (Haifa, Israel).

After more than 22 years at the University of Iowa, Penick was named Head of the Department of Science, Technology, Engineering, and Mathematics Education at North Carolina State University. As Department Head, Penick emphasized research productivity and hired a number of new faculty members. During his more than 10 years as Head, the value of grants obtained by his department grew significantly and his department grew in research productivity.

Following his retirement from NC State in 2009, Penick accepted a position as Director for Research and Development at Sangari do Brasil, in São Paulo Brazil. With the creation of Sangari USA, Penick became vice president for research and development of the American subsidiary. He retired from Sangari in 2011 and currently resides in Miami Florida.

== Honors and offices ==
Active academically, Penick has been or is on the editorial boards of a number of journals. Penick has received formal recognition from a number of groups, including the Association for Science Teacher Education (ASTE), which has presented him with its Outstanding Research award (1976, with James A. Shymansky), Outstanding Mentor award (1997), and named him Outstanding Science Educator in 1987. Penick was elected president of ASTE in 2002-2003. The National Science Teaching Association (NSTA), of which he was president in 2003-2004, awarded him with several awards before naming him to receive the Robert H. Carleton award, its highest honor, in 2013. President of the National Association of Biology Teachers in 1989, he has also received its highest award, Honorary Membership. Epsilon Pi Tau, the national honorary for technology education presented Penick with a Distinguished Service Citation in 2003 for his contributions to technology education. In 1987 and again in 2015, the Florida State University College of Education presented him with the Distinguished Educator award, its highest award, for his contributions to education.

== Early life ==
Born while his father, Edgar C. Penick Jr., was stationed at Langley Virginia during WW II, young John lived in Austin Texas prior to his family moving to Miami Florida in 1947, where, like many others, he dreamed of being the undersea explorer, Jacques Cousteau. After earning his B.S., Penick finished a year of graduate work there in Zoology before becoming a high school biology and chemistry teacher at Miami Jackson Senior High School. After his master's degree, Penick taught one summer at Miami-Dade Community College before being named department head at Miami Jackson. During the 1972-73 school year, he taught high school biology at the Florida State University lab school, with Professor Dorothy Schlitt, Sharyl Bender, and Judy Lewis . A 1978 article describes the innovations they implemented during that experience.

== Family ==
Penick married his high school sweetheart, Nell Inman in 1966 and, after she taught English at Jackson High School for three years, they had two children, Lucas (1969) and Megan (1973). Nell Inman Penick received her Ph.D. in Counseling and Human Development from the University of Iowa in 1990 and had a private practice for marriage and family therapy for 20 years in Iowa and North Carolina, Lucas is a private teacher and tutor, primarily in science and mathematics, in Miami and Megan is an attorney with Dorsey and Whitney in New York City, specializing in securities and corporate law. Megan, with her husband, Yong Jae Lee, has given her parents three grandchildren, Juliet Lee (2006), Renee Lee (2009), and Lia Lee (2010).
