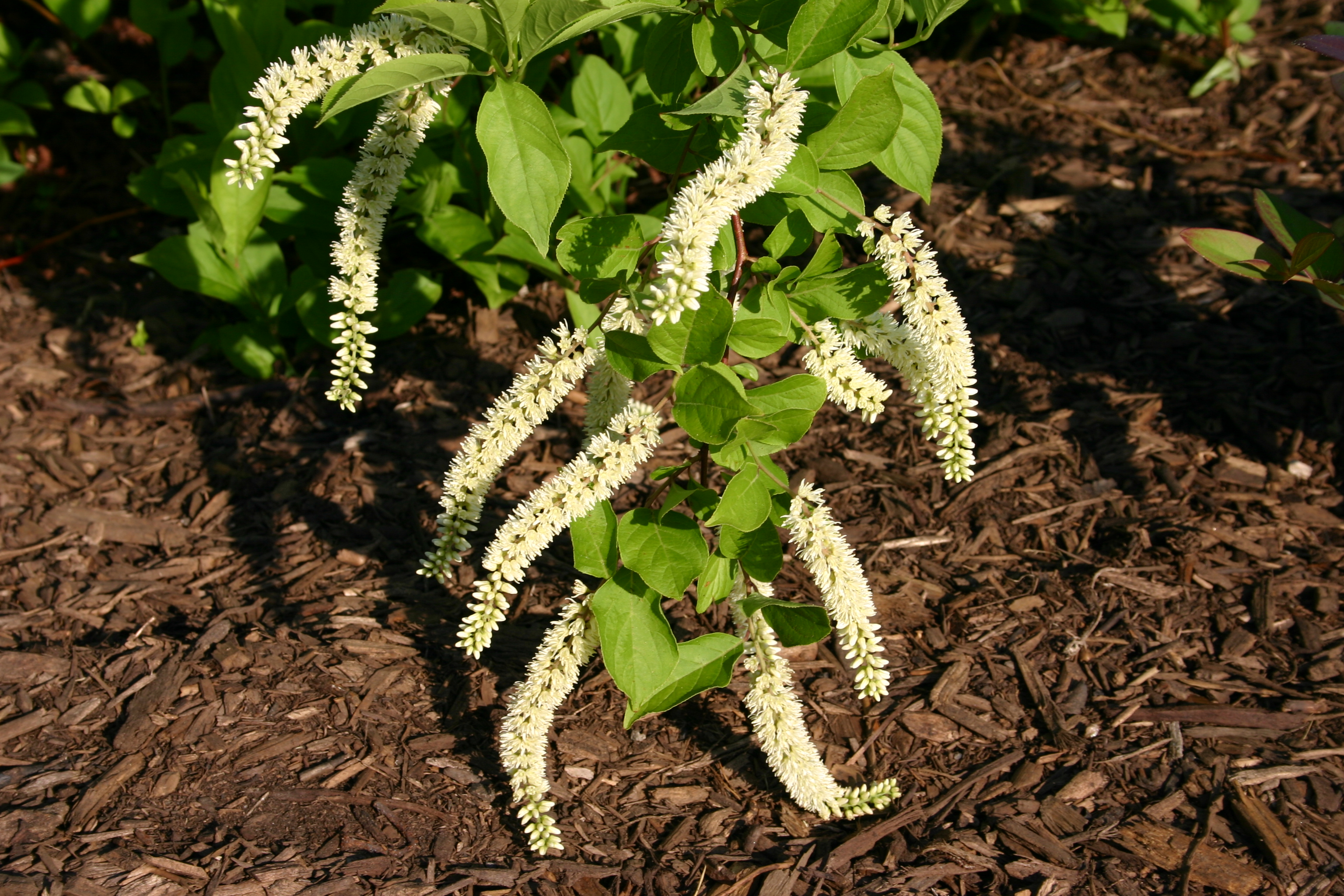
- Itea virginica flowers

Scientific classification
- Kingdom: Plantae
- Clade: Embryophytes
- Clade: Tracheophytes
- Clade: Angiosperms
- Clade: Eudicots
- Order: Saxifragales
- Family: Iteaceae; J.Agardh

Genera
- †Divisestylus; Itea; Pterostemon

= Iteaceae =

Iteaceae Temporal range: Turonian - Recent

Family of shrubs and small trees

Iteaceae is a flowering plant family of trees and shrubs native to the eastern US, southeastern Africa, and south and Southeastern Asia. Some older taxonomic systems place the genus Itea in the family Grossulariaceae. The APG III system of 2009 includes the former Pterostemonaceae in Iteaceae. Consequently, it now has two genera with a total of 18 known species.

== Fossil record ==
The family is known from fossil flowers dating to the Turonian age of the Late Cretaceous that have been found in the Raritan Formation, New Jersey and from leaves dating to the Eocene found in the Klondike Mountain Formation, Washington.

As stated by Martinetto (2001), "a few seeds and one fruit" of †Itea europea were found in "two samples of muddy sediment from the Fossil Forest of Dunarobba". In northwestern Italy, it has been recorded in sites of Early or Middle Pliocene age, suggesting I. europea constituted part of the assemblage of mid-Pliocene swamp forests. Fossil pollen of Itea made up 12% of the total in "a short section of the Sarzana Basin (north-western part of central Italy) tentatively assigned to the Miocene–Pliocene transition". The nearest living relative of †Itea europaea is the American species Itea virginica.
