= Takuzo Aida =

Japanese polymer chemist (born 1956)

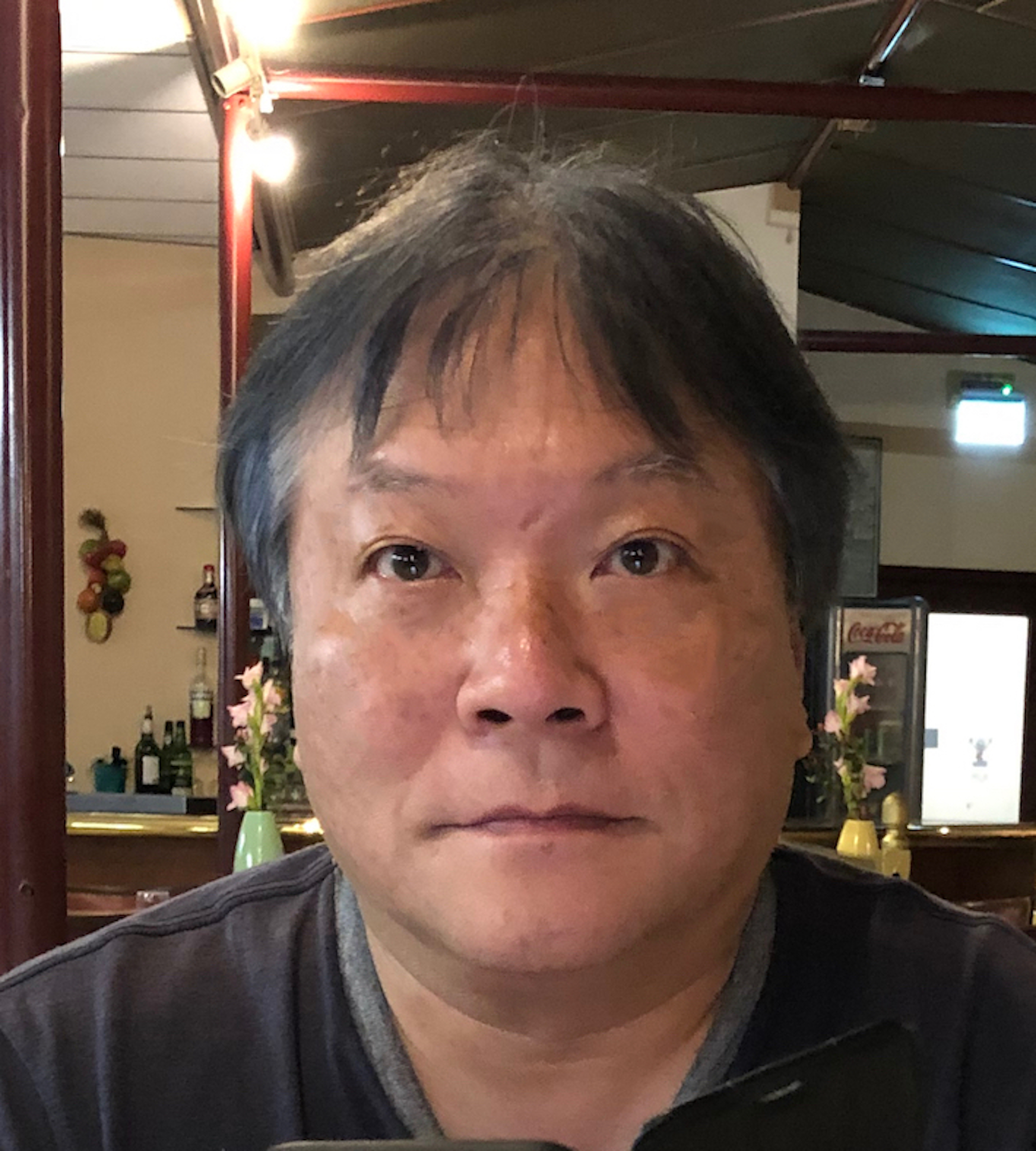
- Born: 3 May 1956 (age 70); Ōita Prefecture, Japan
- Education: Yokohama National University (BEng, 1979); University of Tokyo (MEng, 1981; DEng, 1984)
- Awards: Chemical Society of Japan Award (2008); ACS Award in Polymer Chemistry (2009); Humboldt Research Award (2011); Chirality Medal (2017); Japan Academy Prize (2018)
- Scientific career
- Fields: Polymer chemistry, Supramolecular chemistry, Materials chemistry
- Workplaces: University of Tokyo; RIKEN
- Doctoral advisor: Shohei Inoue
- Website: www.aidacreativehub.com/takuzo-aida

Takuzo Aida (相田 卓三, Aida Takuzō, born 3 May 1956) is a Japanese polymer chemist specializing in supramolecular chemistry and materials science. He is deputy director of the RIKEN Center for Emergent Matter Science and a distinguished professor in the Department of Chemistry and Biotechnology at the University of Tokyo.

== Early life and education ==
Aida was born in Ōita Prefecture, Japan. He earned a Bachelor of Engineering in physical chemistry from Yokohama National University in 1979. He then pursued graduate studies in polymer chemistry at the University of Tokyo under Shohei Inoue, receiving a Master of Engineering in 1981 and a Doctor of Engineering in 1984.

== Career ==
Following his doctorate, Aida joined the University of Tokyo as a research assistant in 1984, advancing to lecturer in 1989 and associate professor in 1991. He was appointed full professor in the Department of Chemistry and Biotechnology in 1996. In 2008, he began a concurrent appointment at RIKEN, where he served as director of the RIKEN Advanced Science Institute until 2012 and has been deputy director of the Center for Emergent Matter Science since 2013. In 2022, the University of Tokyo designated him a distinguished professor.

Aida has served on the Board of Reviewing Editors for Science since 2009 and on the advisory board of the Journal of the American Chemical Society from 2014 to 2021.

He was elected a foreign member of the Royal Netherlands Academy of Arts and Sciences in 2020, a member of the National Academy of Engineering in 2021, and an international honorary member of the American Academy of Arts and Sciences in 2023.

== Research ==
Aida's research focuses on supramolecular polymers, including self-assembly, controlled polymerization, and applications in functional materials such as conductive nanotubes and self-healing polymers. Key contributions include:

- Development of "immortal polymerization," a living polymerization technique tolerant to chain transfer (1988).
- Self-assembled graphitic nanotubes from hexabenzocoronene derivatives, enabling electronic conductivity and helical chirality (2004–2011).
- Chain-growth supramolecular polymerization, distinct from traditional step-growth mechanisms (2015).
- Thermally bisignate supramolecular polymerization, yielding distinct structures upon heating or cooling (2017).
- Mechanically robust, self-repairable poly(ether thiourea) via noncovalent cross-linking (2018).
- Solvent-free autocatalytic supramolecular polymerization of phthalocyanines (2021).

His work also encompasses photoenergy harvesting in dendrimers and redox-responsive nanostructures.

== Awards and honors ==
Aida's contributions have been recognized with numerous awards, including:

- 1993: Society of Polymer Science, Japan Award
- 2005: Inoue Prize for Science
- 2008: Chemical Society of Japan Award
- 2009: ACS Award in Polymer Chemistry
- 2010: Medal of Honor with Purple Ribbon
- 2011: Humboldt Research Award
- 2015: Leo Esaki Prize
- 2017: Chirality Medal
- 2018: Japan Academy Prize
- 2021: Ryoji Noyori ACES Award
- 2021: Netherlands Award for Supramolecular Chemistry
