= Chirality (journal) =

- Discipline: Chiral chemistry
- Language: English
- Edited by: Nina Berova

Publication details
- History: 1989–present
- Publisher: Wiley-Liss (United States)
- Frequency: Monthly
- Open access: Hybrid
- Impact factor: 2.183 (2021)

Standard abbreviations
- ISO 4: Chirality

Indexing
- CODEN: CHRLEP
- ISSN: 0899-0042 (print); 1520-636X (web)

Links
- Journal homepage; Online access

Chirality is a monthly peer-reviewed scientific journal publishing original contributions of scientific work on the role of chirality in chemistry and biochemistry in respect to biological, chemical, materials, pharmacological, spectroscopic and physical properties. The editor-in-chief is Nina Berova (Columbia University).

According to the Journal Citation Reports, the journal has a 2021 impact factor of 2.183.
