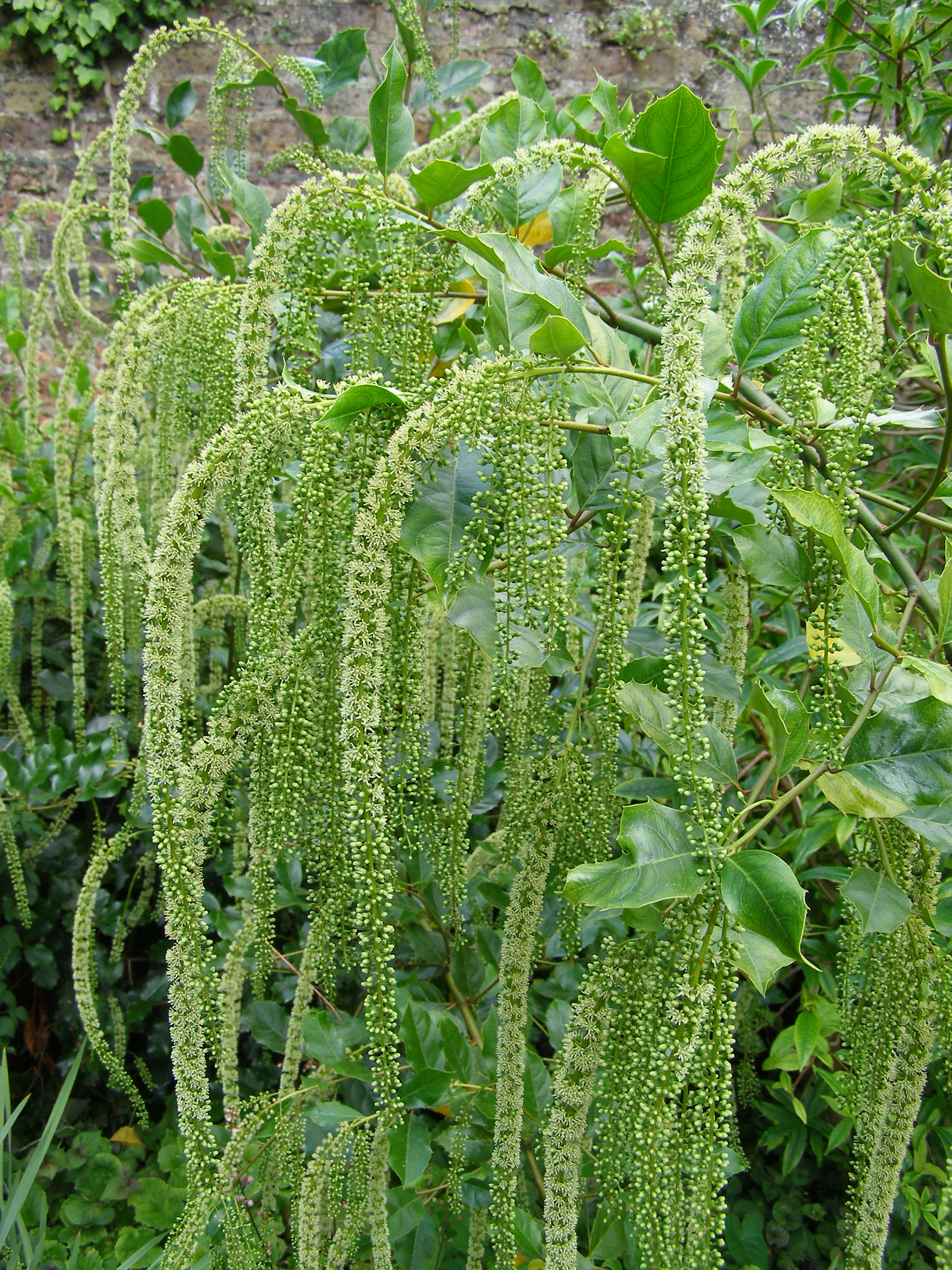
- Itea ilicifolia

Scientific classification
- Kingdom: Plantae
- Clade: Tracheophytes
- Clade: Angiosperms
- Clade: Eudicots
- Order: Saxifragales
- Family: Iteaceae
- Genus: Itea; L.

Type species
- Itea virginica L.

= Itea (plant) =

Genus of plants

Itea is a genus of about 10 species of shrubs and small trees, commonly called sweetspires. The leaves are alternate. Flowers are small, with 5 sepals and 5 petals, borne in racemes or spikes.

The genus is native to eastern Asia, with one deciduous species from eastern North America.

Some species are grown in ornamental gardens for their long pendant and fragrant flower heads. These include the evergreen I. ilicifolia and I. yunnanensis from central and western China. A different, more upright growing characteristic can be found in the deciduous I. virginica of eastern North America.

Species include:

- Itea chinensis Hook. & Arn. – Chinese sweetspire
- Itea ilicifolia Oliv. – holly-leaved sweet spire
- Itea japonica Oliv. – Japanese sweetspire
- Itea oldhamii C. K. Schneid.
- Itea parviflora Hemsl.
- Itea rhamnoides (Harv.) Kubitzki
- Itea virginica L. – Virginia sweetspire
- Itea yunnanensis Franch.
