= Marcy Towns =

American chemist

Marcy Hamby Towns
- Education: Purdue University; Linfield University
- Scientific career
- Workplaces: Purdue University; Ball State University

Marcy Hamby Towns is an American chemist who is Professor of Chemistry Education at Purdue University. Her research considers the development of innovative ways to teach undergraduate chemistry. She was awarded the IUPAC Distinguished Women in Chemistry Award in 2021.

== Early life and education ==
Towns is the daughter of a chemist. She was an undergraduate student at Linfield University and moved to Purdue University for graduate studies. After completing college, she started teaching chemistry at Valley Catholic School, where she became interested in chemistry education.

== Research and career ==
Towns joined the chemistry department at Ball State University in 1995. She taught chemistry in Indiana for twelve years, after which she returned to the faculty at Purdue University and developed a research program in chemistry education and evidence-based learning. She is particularly interested in undergraduate chemistry teaching and laboratory assessment.

== Awards and honors ==
- 2009 Fellow of the American Association for the Advancement of Science
- 2013 Murphy Award
- 2017 American Chemical Society James Flack Norris Award
- 2019 Royal Society of Chemistry Nyholm Prize for Education
- 2020 American Chemical Society Outstanding Service to the Division Award
- 2021 IUPAC Distinguished Women in Chemistry
- 2021 Morrill Award

== Selected publications ==
- Lisa Corwin Auchincloss; Sandra L. Laursen; Janet L Branchaw; et al. (January 1, 2014). "Assessment of course-based undergraduate research experiences: a meeting report". CBE: Life Sciences Education. 13 (1): 29–40. doi:10.1187/cbe.14-01-0004. ISSN 1931-7913. PMC 3940459. PMID 24591501. Wikidata Q42426115.
- Gauthier, Stephen (December 7, 2017). "Characterizing Chiral Molecules Deposited onto a Silicon Surface". Inquiry@Queen's Undergraduate Research Conference Proceedings. doi:10.24908/iqurcp.7950. ISSN 2563-8912.
- Harle, Marissa; Towns, Marcy (November 29, 2010). "A Review of Spatial Ability Literature, Its Connection to Chemistry, and Implications for Instruction". Journal of Chemical Education. 88 (3): 351–360. doi:10.1021/ed900003n. ISSN 0021-9584.
