= Stacey Kiser =

American biologist

- Education: Oregon State University; University of Oregon
- Occupation: Biologist

Stacey Kiser is an American biologist. She is a professor in the department of science at Lane Community College.

In 2020, Kiser was named a fellow of the American Association for the Advancement of Science.
