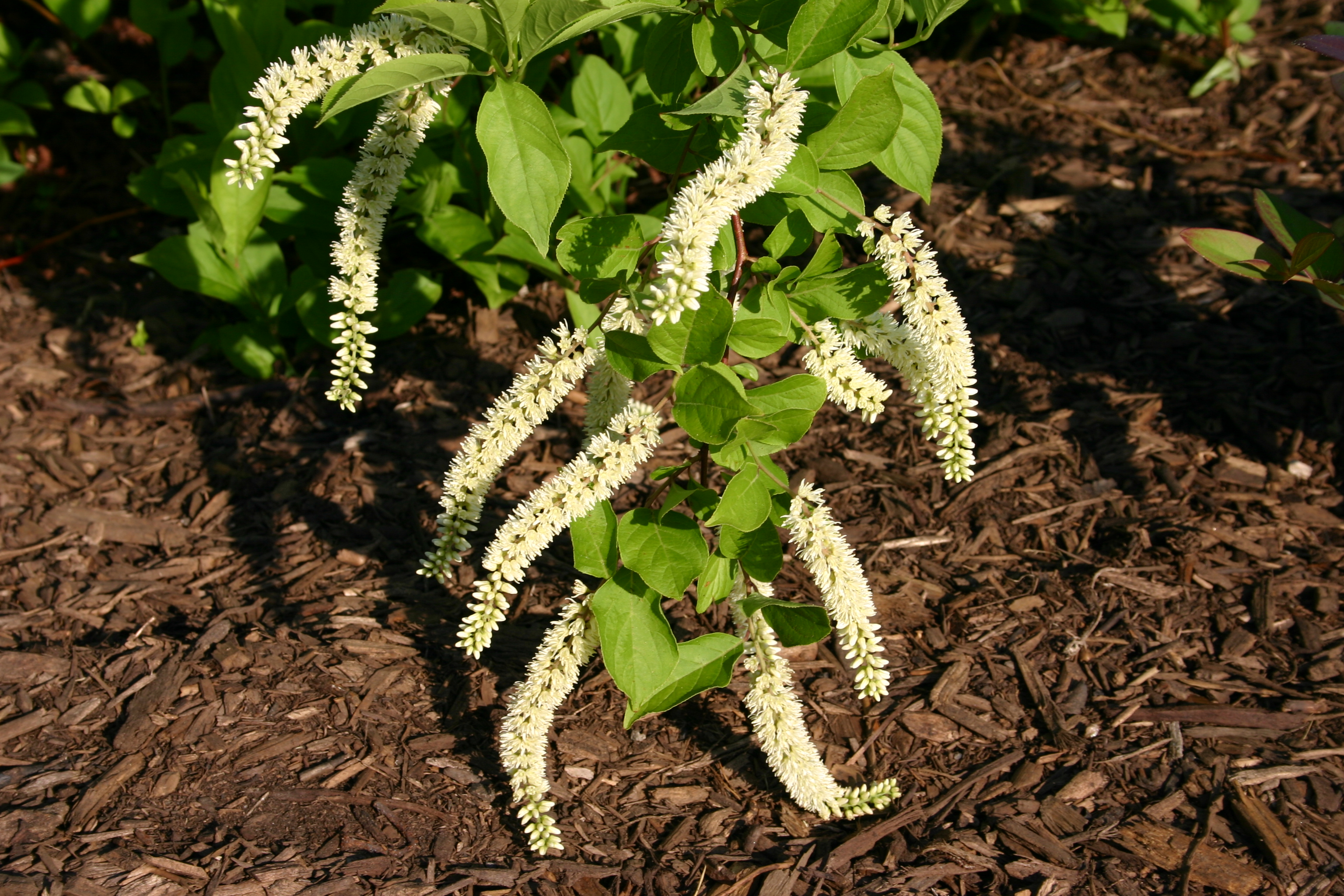
- Flowering branch

Conservation status
- Apparently Secure (NatureServe)

Scientific classification
- Kingdom: Plantae
- Clade: Tracheophytes
- Clade: Angiosperms
- Clade: Eudicots
- Order: Saxifragales
- Family: Iteaceae
- Genus: Itea
- Species: I. virginica

Binomial name
- Itea virginica L.

Synonyms
- Itea padifolia Salisb.; Diconangia heterophyla Raf.; Itea virginica f. abbreviata Fernald

= Itea virginica =

Species of tree

Itea virginica, commonly known as Virginia willow or Virginia sweetspire, is a small North American flowering shrub that grows in low-lying woods and wetland margins. Virginia willow is a member of the Iteaceae family, and native to the southeast United States. Itea virginica has small flowers on pendulous racemes.

Depending on location, the species will bloom in late spring to early summer. It prefers moist rich soil, but it can tolerate a wide range of soil types. When Virginia willow is used in horticulture it can form large colonies and may form dense root suckers, making the shrub hard to remove.

== Description ==
Itea virginica is a deciduous shrub that grows to 2.5 m (8.2 ft) tall and 1.5 m (4.9 ft) broad, with alternate, simple leaves on arching stems. The plant's white or cream flowers bloom in summer, borne in downward-pointing, slightly curved spikes. It is a multi-stemmed, suckering and colonizing plant, with the stems branching infrequently except at the tops. In favorable conditions it may become semi-evergreen. The leaves turn shades of red in fall (autumn). It is hardy down to at least −29 °C (−20 °F).

== Distribution and habitat ==
I. virginica's range extends from New Jersey south to Florida, and westward to Texas and Oklahoma.

This species' has been observed in shaded and wet areas, such as swamps, wooded floodplains, pine forests, and hydric hammocks.

== Conservation ==
Itea virginica is listed as "apparently secure" overall by NatureServe, and critically imperiled in Pennsylvania, Indiana and Oklahoma.

== Taxonomy ==
Itea virginica belongs to the Iteaceae, a family of deciduous and evergreen shrubs. It is the only species in its genus in North America; most Itea species are from east Asia. Some authors have historically placed Virginia sweetspire in the Grossulariaceae or Saxifragaceae families.

== Horticulture ==
In cultivation in the UK the cultivar 'Henry's Garnet' has gained the Royal Horticultural Society's Award of Garden Merit. Itea virginica is used as a native ornamental landscape plant in North America, and numerous cultivars have been named. The flowers attract pollinators, and the shrub can be used for erosion control.
