= James A. Shymansky =

James A. Shymansky is the holder of the E. Desmond Lee Family Professor of Science Education II endowed professorship. He has published over 70 articles in refereed journals and delivered more than 150 papers at conferences. One of his co-authored articles, "The effects of new science curricula on student performance," was selected in 2003 by a panel of science education researchers as one of thirteen "most influential articles published in the Journal of Research in Science Teaching's first 40 years."

Shymansky received his B.Sc. in Education from Bloomsburg State College (1965), M.Sc in Physics from Indiana State University (1969), and Ph.D. in Science Education from the Florida State University (1972). He became a member of the University of Missouri-St. Louis faculty in 1997. He previously taught for 5 years in elementary, middle and high schools in Pennsylvania, New Jersey, Indiana and Florida and for 25 years at the University of Iowa.

His research has focused on factors influencing student performance in inquiry science classrooms and has co-authored a major elementary science series, a multi-state set of science review books, and more than a dozen of monographs and book chapters.

Shymansky is a past editor of the Journal of Research in Science Teaching, and currently serves as senior editor of the International Journal of Science and Math Education, a new journal published by the National Science Council of Taiwan and Kluwer Publishing of the Netherlands. He also currently serves on advisory boards for the National Geographic Society and Harcourt Educational Measurement Company.

Shymansky is married and he and his wife, Teresa, have four children and fifteen grandchildren.
