= International Technology and Engineering Educators Association =

- Formation: 1939
- Formerly called: American Industrial Arts Association

The International Technology and Engineering Educators Association (ITEEA, formerly ITEA) is an organization devoted to improving technology education and engineering through the use of technology, innovation, design, and engineering experiences at the K-12 school levels. It represents over 35,000 technology educators throughout the world. It has members in over 45 countries, most of whom are in North America. The organization seeks to advance technological capabilities for all people and to promote professionalism of those engaged in these pursuits.

ITEEA publishes Technology and Engineering Teacher (K-12) and Children's Technology and Engineering (K-6), The Journal of Technology Education (a professional journal), STEM Connections, and a variety of other publications that lead the profession by providing teaching directions, instructional ideas, and networking opportunities.

ITEEA also holds an annual conference for educators, administrators, and other leaders in the field of technology and engineering education. The 2015 ITEEA conference was held in Milwaukee, WI.

It was established as the American Industrial Arts Association by William E. Warner in 1939. The name changed to ITEA (International Technology Education Association) and then to ITEEA in 2010, to enable ITEEA to better handle content related to engineering education in addition to technology education.
