= National Association of Biology Teachers =

American professional organization

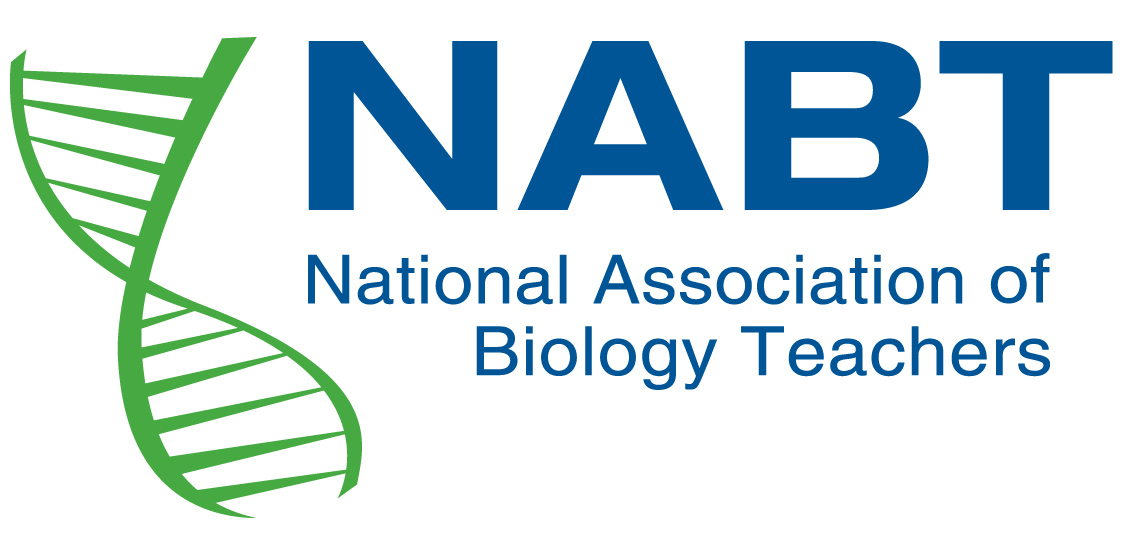
- Formation: 1938
- Founded at: New York
- Type: Education-related professional association
- Headquarters: Warrenton, Virginia
- President: Kirstin Milks
- President-Elect: Vedham Karpakakunjaram
- Past President: Amanda Townley
- Secretary/Treasurer: Jacqueline Washington
- Board of directors: Kristy Daniel (Directors at Large); Anneke Metz (Directors at Large); Andrew Bullard (Director/Coordinators); Lee Ferguson (Director/Coordinators)
- Employees: (2025)
- Website: nabt.org

The National Association of Biology Teachers (NABT) is an incorporated association of biology educators in the United States. It was initially founded in response to the poor understanding of biology and the decline in the teaching of the subject in the 1930s. It has grown to become a national representative organisation which promotes the teaching of biology, supports the learning of biology based on scientific principles and advocates for biology within American society. The National Conference and the journal, The American Biology Teacher, are two mechanisms used to achieve those goals. The NABT has also been an advocate for the teaching of evolution in the debate about creation and evolution in public education in the United States, playing a role in a number of court cases and hearings throughout the country.

== History ==
The NABT was formed in 1938 in New York City. The journal of the organisation (The American Biology Teacher) was created in the same year. In 1944, Helen Trowbridge, the first female president, was elected. The Outstanding Teacher Awards were first presented in 1960 and the first independent National Convention was held in 1968. The seventies marked an era of activism in the teaching of evolution with legal action against a state code amendment in Tennessee which required equal amounts of time to teach evolution and creationism.

In 1987 NABT helped develop the first National High School Biology test which established a list of nine core principles in the teaching of biology. In the year 2005, NABT was involved in the Kitzmiller v. Dover Area School District case which established the principle that Intelligent Design had no place in the Science Curriculum. 2017 was the Year of the March for Science, which the NABT endorsed, and in 2018, it held its annual four-day conference in San Diego, California.

On January 29, 2025, Lindsey Fields, then president-elect of the NABT, died in a plane crash over the Potomac River in Virginia.

== Purpose ==
The purpose of the NABT is to "empower educators to provide the best possible biology and life science education for all students". The organisation is focused on learner-centered pedagogy; relevant and scientifically validated content; support for biology educators; and is an advocate for teachers and students.

== Structure ==
The governance structure of the NABT consists of a central Board of Directors led by a President elected on a yearly basis. To actually run different aspects of the organisation, several committees focus on areas such as finance, memberships and professional development. The NABT has 10 regions within the United States and each region has its own coordinator. Finally, there are cross-sectional groups within the organisation to support groups such as AP Biology teachers, College Biology lecturers and the NABT Bioclubs.

== Policy positions ==
The NABT has a number of position papers on areas such as the principles of good science teaching, equity in science education and a number of statements on ethics and safety that pertain to the teaching of Biology. Such position papers have not been without controversy. For example, in 1995, the position paper on evolution stated that the process was an "unsupervised, impersonal" process. After complaints from some quarters, these two words were removed. A group of scientists objected to the move, but the changes remained. The most current statement on evolution by the NABT was due to be updated in 2018.

== Key activities and resources ==
=== Annual Professional Development Conference ===
The conference has included sessions by key speakers, workshops, field trips and special events such as First Timer's breakfasts.

=== Awards ===
Awards for teachers including Outstanding Biology Teacher Award, University Teaching Award and Distinguished Service Award which, in 2018, was given to science communicator, Vito Leyssens.

=== The American Biology Teacher ===
This journal is printed nine times a year. It includes "classroom application and content updates, ... [and] research on learning, thus giving [its] members an outlet to publish their scholarly work." It was in this journal in 1973 that Theodosius Dobzhansky wrote the phrase, "Nothing in Biology Makes Sense Except in the Light of Evolution", a paper which "shows how evolution is the cornerstone which supports and unifies the many fields within biology".

=== Other resources ===
The NABT also produces information such as a bi-monthly newsletter with current news and developments within the organisation, classroom resources and downloadable books for the biology teacher.

== See also ==
- List of National Association of Biology Teachers presidents
