= Ventzio =

Ventzio Βέντζιο
- Municipal unit
- Location within the regional unit

- Location within Greece
- Coordinates: 40°05′N 21°39′E
- Country: Greece
- Administrative region: Western Macedonia
- Regional unit: Grevena
- Municipality: Grevena

Area
  - Municipal unit: 323.277 km^{2} (124.818 sq mi)

Population (2021)
  - Municipal unit: 1,370
  - Municipal unit density: 4.24/km^{2} (11.0/sq mi)
- Time zone: UTC+2 (EET)
  - Summer (DST): UTC+3 (EEST)
- Postal code: 511 00
- Area code: +30-2462
- Vehicle registration: PN

Ventzio (Greek: Βέντζιο) is a municipal unit of the Grevena municipality. Before the 2011 local government reform it was an independent municipality. Ventzio covers an area of 323.277 km^{2}. The seat of the municipality was in Knidi.

== Population ==
Historical population
Year	Pop.	±%
2001	2,364	—
2011	1,969	−16.7%
2021	1,370	−30.4%
