= Barbital =

Chemical compound

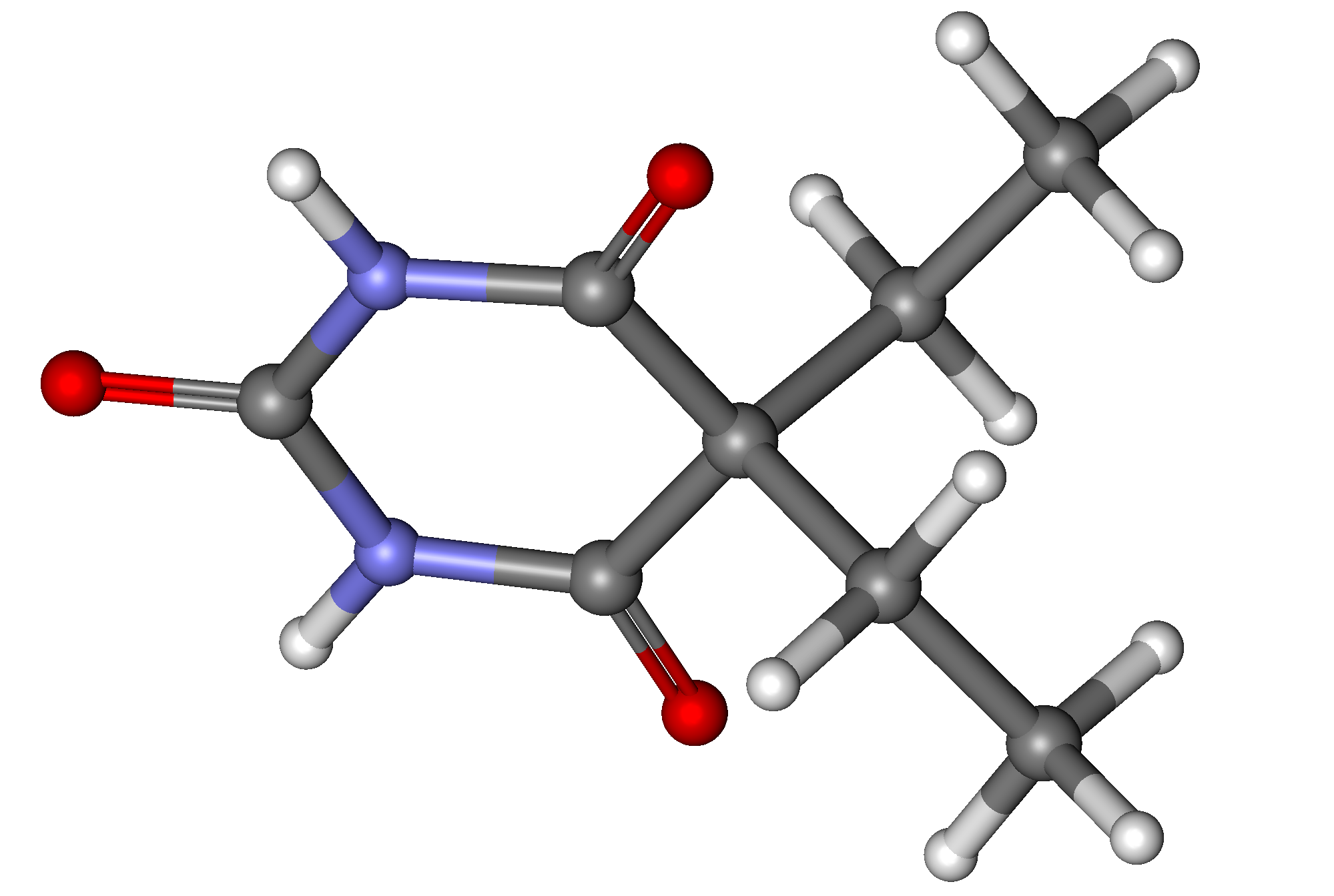

Clinical data
- Trade names: Veronal, Medinal
- AHFS/Drugs.com: International Drug Names
- MedlinePlus: a682221
- Routes of administration: By mouth
- Drug class: Barbiturate
- ATC code: N05CA04 (WHO)

Legal status
- Legal status: BR: Class B1 (Psychoactive drugs); CA: Schedule IV; DE: Anlage III (Special prescription form required); US: Schedule IV

Pharmacokinetic data
- Elimination half-life: 30.3 (± 3.2) hours

Identifiers
- IUPAC name: 5,5-diethylpyrimidine-2,4,6(1H,3H,5H)-trione
- CAS Number: 57-44-3
- PubChem CID: 2294
- DrugBank: DB01483
- ChemSpider: 2206
- UNII: 5WZ53ENE2P
- KEGG: D01740
- ChEBI: CHEBI:31252
- ChEMBL: ChEMBL444
- CompTox Dashboard (EPA): DTXSID5022643
- ECHA InfoCard: 100.000.301

Chemical and physical data
- Formula: C_{8}H_{12}N_{2}O_{3}
- Molar mass: 184.195 g·mol^{−1}
- 3D model (JSmol): Interactive image
- SMILES: O=C1NC(=O)NC(=O)C1(CC)CC
- InChI: InChI=1S/C8H12N2O3/c1-3-8(4-2)5(11)9-7(13)10-6(8)12/h3-4H2,1-2H3,(H2,9,10,11,12,13); Key:FTOAOBMCPZCFFF-UHFFFAOYSA-N

Barbital (or barbitone), sold under the brand names Veronal for the pure acid and Medinal for the sodium salt, was the first commercially available barbiturate. It was used as a sleeping aid (hypnotic) from 1903 until the mid-1950s. The chemical names for barbital are diethylmalonyl urea or diethylbarbituric acid; hence, the sodium salt is known also as sodium diethylbarbiturate.

== Synthesis ==
Barbital, then called "Veronal", was first synthesized in 1902 by German chemists Emil Fischer and Joseph von Mering, who published their discovery in 1903. Barbital was prepared by condensing diethylmalonic ester with urea in the presence of sodium ethoxide, or by adding at least two molar equivalents of ethyl iodide to the silver salt of malonylurea (barbituric acid) or possibly to a basic solution of the acid. The result was an odorless, slightly bitter, white crystalline powder.

Its introduction followed the investigations of Fischer and von Mering on the pharmacological properties of certain open and closed acylureas (then called ureides). Led by the impression that hypnotic action appears to be largely dependent on the presence of ethyl groups, they prepared diethylacetyl urea, diethylmalonyl urea (i.e., Barbital itself), and dipropylmalonyl urea. All three were found to be hypnotics: the first was about equal in power to the already-known sulphonal (now sulfonmethane), whilst the third was four times as powerful, but its use was attended by prolonged after-effects. Veronal was found to be midway.

Barbital can also be synthesized in a condensation reaction from urea and diethyl-2,2-diethylmalonate, a diethyl malonate derivative:

== Marketing ==
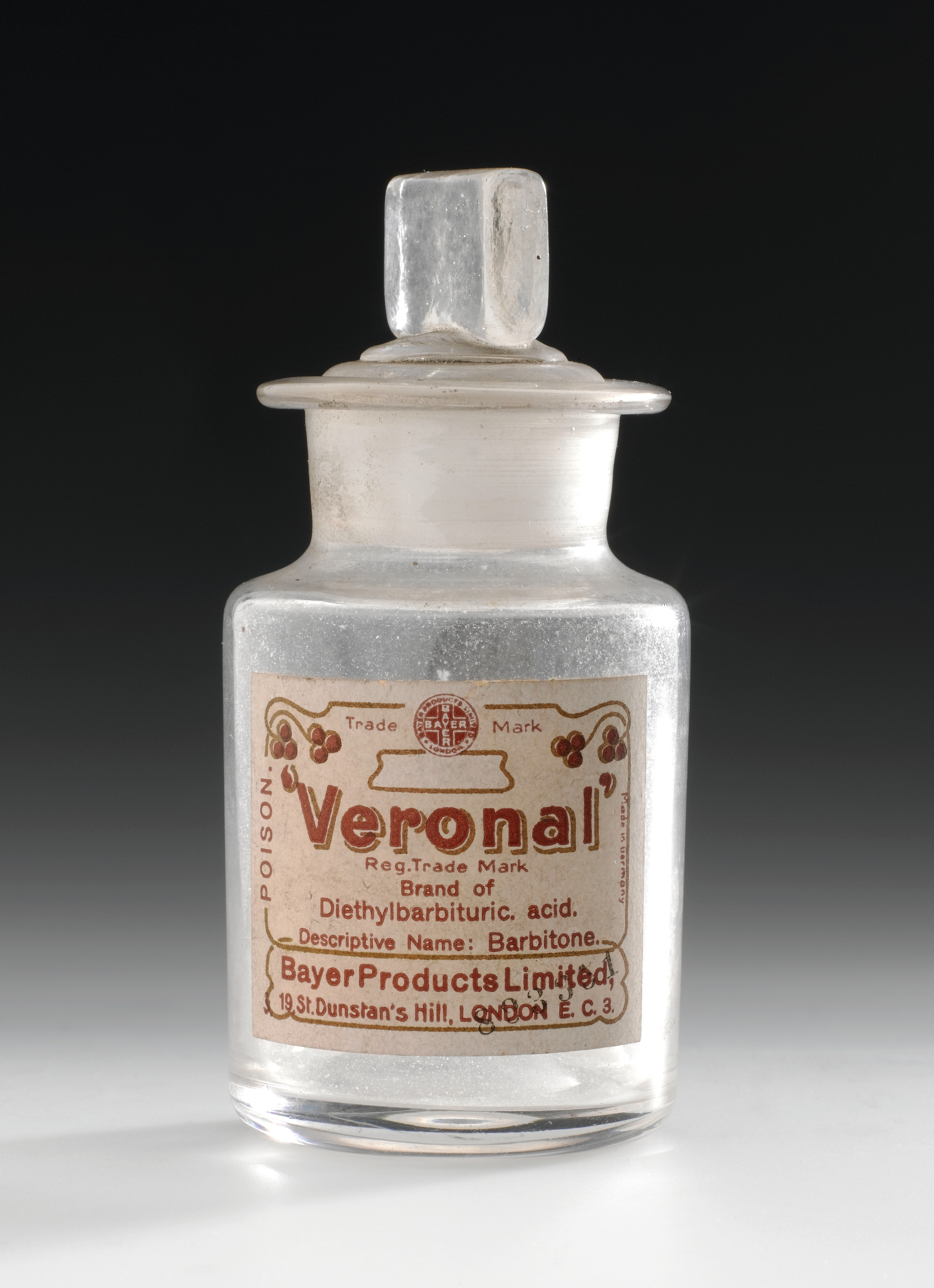
Bottle for "Veronal" crystals, named after the Italian city of Verona, was the first commercially available barbiturate, manufactured by Bayer.

Barbital was marketed in 1904 by Bayer as "Veronal," while the soluble salt of barbital was marketed by Schering as "Medinal." It was dispensed for "insomnia induced by nervous excitability." It was provided in either crystal form or in capsules. The therapeutic dose was ten to fifteen grains (0.6–1 grams). 3.5 to 4.4 grams (55 to 68 grains) is considered the lethal dose.

== Pharmacology ==
Barbital was considered to be a great improvement over the existing hypnotics. Its taste was slightly bitter, but better than the strong, unpleasant taste of the commonly used bromides. It had few side effects, and its therapeutic dose was far below the toxic dose. However, prolonged usage resulted in tolerance to the drug, requiring higher doses to reach the desired effect. "I'm literally saturated with it", the Russian tsarina Alexandra Feodorovna confessed to a friend. Fatal overdoses of this slow-acting hypnotic were common. Pioneering aviator Arthur Whitten Brown, one of two men who made the first non-stop transatlantic flight, died of an accidental overdose.

A photoswitchable derivative of barbital based on a donor-acceptor Stenhouse adduct (DASA) has been developed for research purposes (photopharmacology). DASA-barbital shows neuronal activity via GABA_{A} receptors and reversible photoisomerization in water using cyclodextrin.

== pH buffer ==
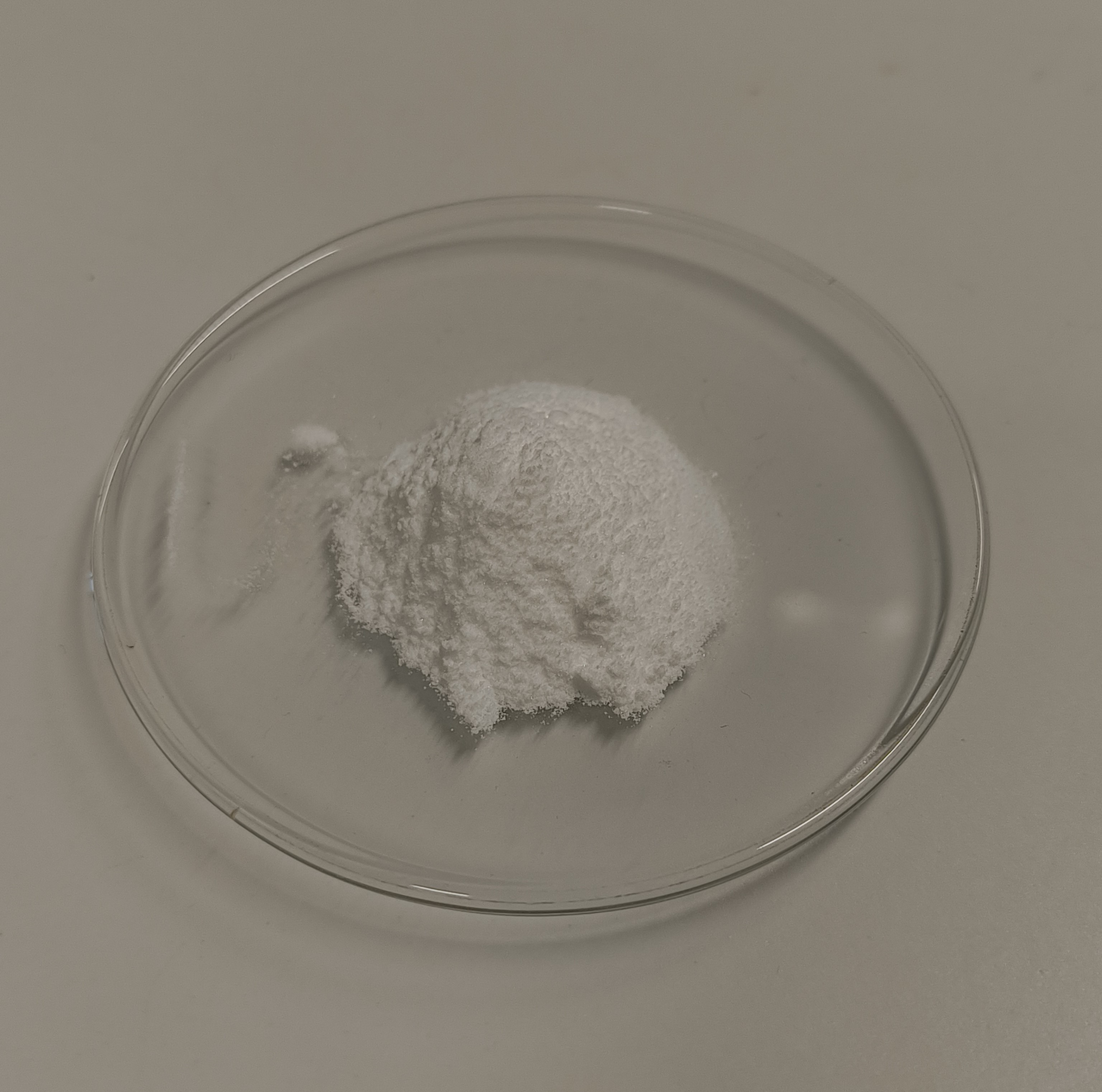
Sample of sodium barbital used as a pH buffer

Solutions of sodium barbital have also been used as pH buffers for biological research, e.g., in immunoelectrophoresis or in fixative solutions. As barbital is a controlled substance, barbital-based buffers have largely been replaced by other substances.

== Poisoning ==
Veronal from Bayer in glass tubes with cork caps - 10 tablets probably produced around 1940

Japanese writer Ryūnosuke Akutagawa deliberately overdosed on the drug in 1927, as did Un Chien Andalou actor Pierre Batcheff in 1932, Hungarian poet Gyula Juhász in 1937, German mathematician Felix Hausdorff in 1942, Austrian writer Stefan Zweig in 1942, French Anarchist Germaine Berton in 1942, and Greek musician Attik in 1944. During the Holocaust, many Jewish residents of Berlin, Dresden, Wiesbaden, and other German cities used Veronal to take their lives by suicide to avoid deportation to concentration camps by the Nazi Regime. Alfred Kerr, a German theatre critic and essayist, suffered a stroke on a trip to Germany after WWII and decided to end his own life via an overdose of Veronal, which was procured for him by his wife.

Eric Mareo, son of playwright Raimund Pechotsch, murdered his wife Thelma with Veronal. Thelma's lesbian lover Freda Stark was a key witness at the trial.

== In fiction ==
In the D. H. Lawrence story, The Lovely Lady, the titular character dies from a self-administered overdose.

In the Dorothy Parker story, Big Blonde, the main character "Hazel Morse" tries to kill herself by swallowing 20 tablets of Veronal.

In Somerset Maugham's short story, Virtue, the character, Charlie Bishop, commits suicide with Veronal
