= Photoactivated peptide =

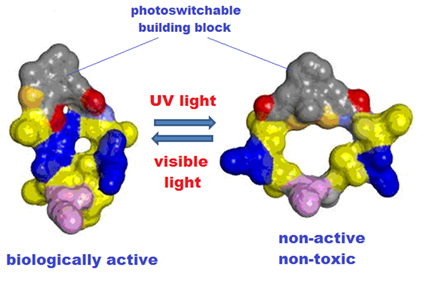
Schematic representation of activation/deactivation of a photoswitchable peptide

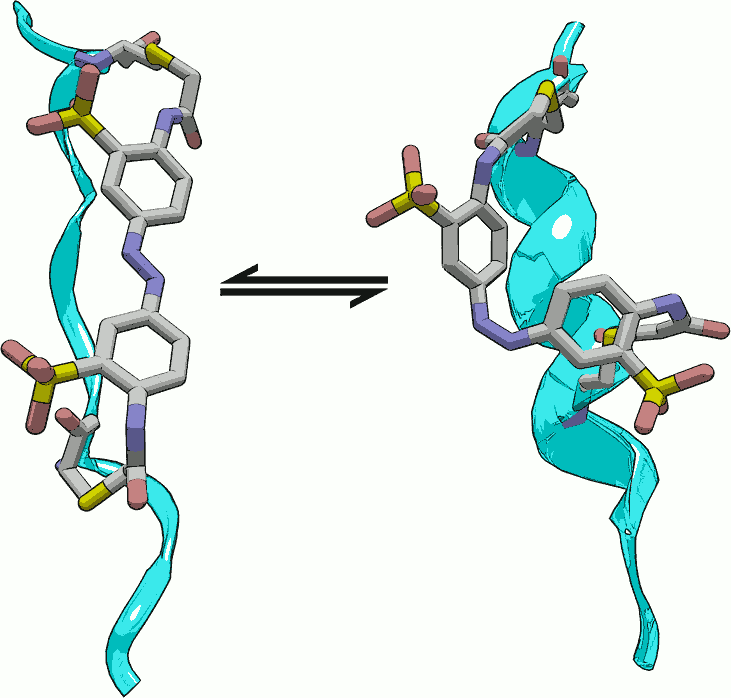
A cartoon of a peptide with an azobenzene dye attached to the sidechains of cysteine residues. Exposure to 360 nm light causes photoisomerization of the diazo dye from E to Z, shortening it and encouraging a more alpha-helical conformation

Photoactivated peptides are modified natural or synthetic peptides whose functions can be activated or controlled using light. These peptides incorporate light-sensitive elements that allow for precise regulation their biological activity in both space and time. The activation can be either irreversible, as in the case of caged peptides with photocleavable protecting groups, or reversible, utilizing molecular photoswitches like azobenzenes or diarylethenes, and diarylethenes By incorporating these light-responsive components into the peptide structure, peptide properties, functions, and biological activities can be manipulated with high precision. This approach enables targeted activation of peptides in specific areas, making photoactivated peptides valuable tools for applications in cancer therapy, drug delivery, and probing molecular interactions in living cells and in organisms.

== Applications ==
Photoactivated peptides have shown potential for various applications, including cancer therapy, other light-controlled drugs, and as tools to probe molecular interactions in intact cells and whole organisms.

Initial studies demonstrated that these peptides could effectively kill B-cell lymphoma cancer cells. Specifically, a synthetic short peptide was alkylated with azobenzene crosslinkers and used to photo-stimulate mitochondrial membrane depolarization and cytochrome c release in permeabilized cells, initiating the intrinsic apoptosis pathway. Analogs of Gramicidin S containing a diarylethene fragment have also been developed, exhibiting a clear, reversible change in antimicrobial activity. In their inactive, UV-inducible photoform, these analogs are harmless to bacteria cells; however, upon activation with visible (amber) light, they become bactericidal. Additionally, a photoswitchable analogue of the orexin-B peptide has been developed, enabling control of orexin receptors with light in vivo at nanomolar concentrations.

Photoswitchable peptides have been designed to inhibit protein-protein interactions in a light-controlled manner. They have been successfully applied to inhibit clathrin-mediated endocytosis in mammalian cells and in yeast. This same design principle has been applied to inhibit protein-protein interactions involved in cancer and can potentially be used for any interaction mediated by a helical motif.

== See also ==
- Azobenzene
- Bak (Bcl-2 homologous antagonist killer)
- Bcl-2
- Bid (BH3 interacting-domain death agonist)
- Diarylethene
- Luis Moroder, Rudolf K. Allemann
- Photochromism
- Photodynamic therapy
- Spiropyran
