= C10H16N2O3 =

The molecular formula C_{10}H_{16}N_{2}O_{3} (molar mass: 212.24 g/mol, exact mass: 212.1161 u) may refer to:

- Butabarbital
- Butobarbital, also called butobarbitone or butethal
- Propylbarbital
