= C11H20O4 =

The molecular formula C_{11}H_{20}O_{4} (molar mass: 216.27 g/mol) may refer to:

- Neopentyl glycol diglycidyl ether
- Diethyl diethylmalonate
