= FTPE =

FTPE is an acronym which can stand for:

- First TransPennine Express
- Fast-tint protective eyewear, a type of photochromic lens
- Facility Technical Proficiency Evaluations, a type of test (assessment)
- Fashion Technologist and Pattern Engineering, a job title in textile manufacturing
- Fédération des Très Petites Entreprises, a French trade organization
- Face Tracking & Pose Estimation, a technology used in facial recognition
