= Rudolf K. Allemann =

Swiss biologist

Rudolf Allemann
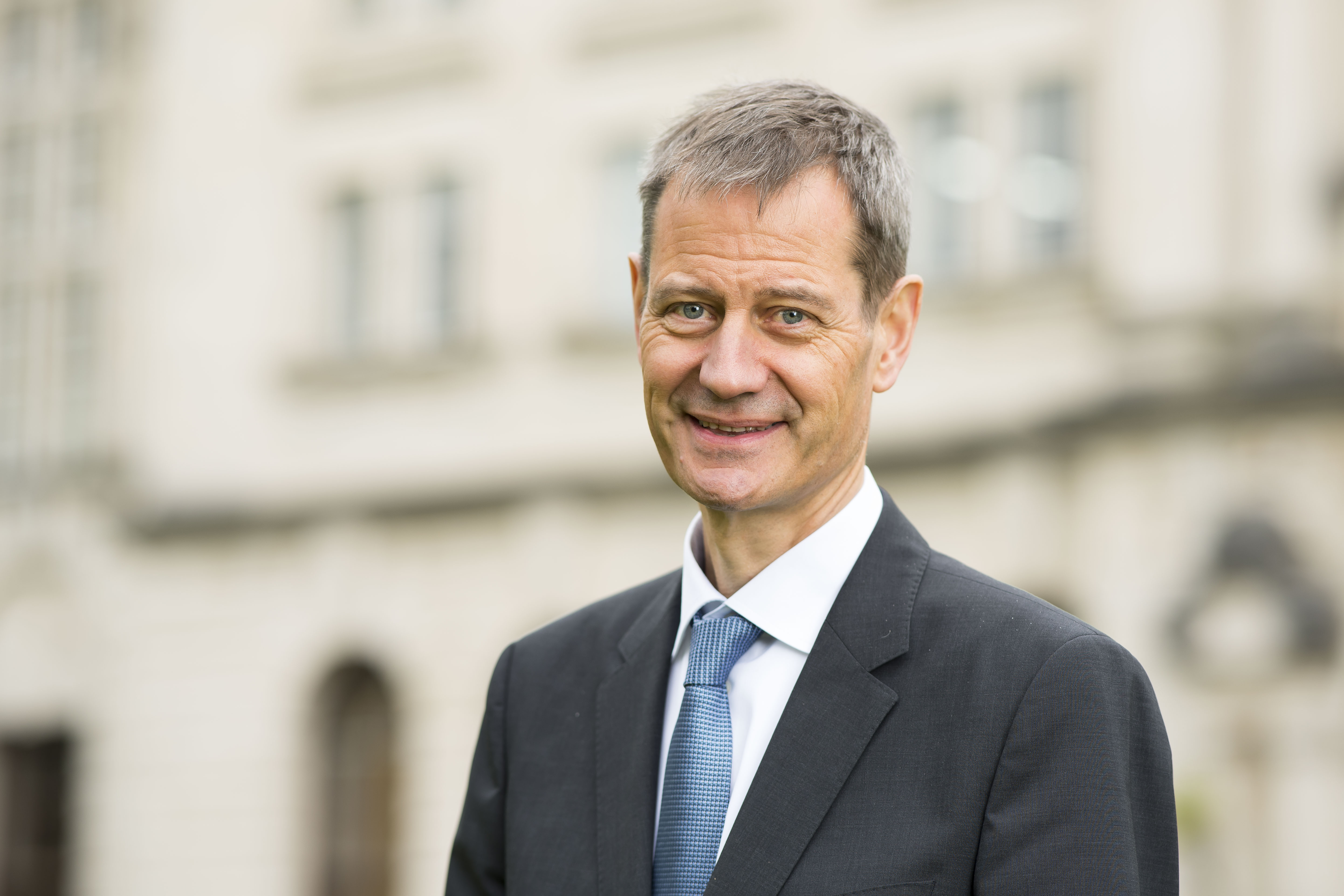
- Education: ETH Zurich
- Known for: Biological Chemistry
- Scientific career
- Fields: Chemical Biology; Synthetic Biology
- Workplaces: Cardiff University
- Doctoral advisor: Steven A. Benner

Professor Rudolf Konrad Allemann is a Distinguished Research Professor and Pro Vice-Chancellor International and Student Recruitment and Head of the College of Physical Sciences and Engineering at Cardiff University. Allemann joined Cardiff University in 2005, after working at the University of Birmingham, the Swiss Federal Institute of Technology ETH Zurich and the UK MRC National Institute for Medical Research at Mill Hill. He was previously Head of the School of Chemistry at Cardiff University until April 2017.

== Education and academic career ==
Allemann earned his Dipl. Chem. ETH (B.S./M.S.) from ETH Zurich in 1985. His PhD was carried out at Harvard University and ETH Zurich with Steven A. Benner and culminated in the award of a Dr. sc. nat ETH for his thesis 'Evolutionary Guidance as a Tool in Organic Chemistry'. He then moved to the UK to as a Royal Society and Swiss National Science Foundation postdoctoral fellow at the National Institute for Medical Research, before returning to the ETH Zurich in 1992 as a research group leader in Biological Chemistry. He completed his habilitation in 1998 ('DNA Recognition by Eukaryotic Transcriptional Regulators') and then joined the University of Birmingham, first as a Senior Lecturer and then Professor of Chemical Biology. Since 2005 he has been a Distinguished Research Professor at Cardiff University and in 2017 was appointed Pro Vice-Chancellor and Head of College of Physical Sciences and Engineering. In 2013 he was elected a Fellow of the Learned Society of Wales.

== Research ==
A leading protagonist of modern biological chemistry, Allemann's research bridges the gap between enzymology and organic chemistry. By exploiting chemical, biophysical, enzymological and molecular biology techniques, he has made contributions towards understanding enzymatic mechanisms. He has pioneered detailed mechanistic investigations of terpene synthases such as aristolochene synthase, germacrene-A synthase and delta-cadinene synthase, leading to insights into how the diversity of the terpenome (terpene and terpenoid natural products) is generated from a single precursor. Allemann's work on hydrogen transfer catalysing enzymes including dihydrofolate reductase has led to deep new insights into the contributions from quantum mechanical tunnelling and protein dynamics to the enormous rate accelerations typical of Nature's catalysts. Allemann's laboratory has been among the pioneers in synthetic biology and has developed innovative applications such as the first generation of designer enzymes, intracellular biophotonic nanoswitches (photoactivated peptides) and optogenetic tools for the control of biological processes in cell culture and in live organisms, as well as pioneering new methodology in synthetic biology for generating novel unnatural terpene-like non-natural natural products with applications in agriculture and healthcare.

== See also ==
- Dihydrofolate reductase
- Terpene
- Photoactivated peptide
