= Photoswitch =

Type of molecule

A photoswitch is a type of molecule that can change its structural geometry and chemical properties upon irradiation with electromagnetic radiation. Although often used interchangeably with the term molecular machine, a switch does not perform work upon a change in its shape whereas a machine does. However, photochromic compounds are the necessary building blocks for light-driven molecular motors and machines. Upon irradiation with light, photoisomerization about double bonds in the molecule can lead to changes in the cis- or trans- configuration. These photochromic molecules are being considered for a range of applications.

== Chemical structures and properties ==
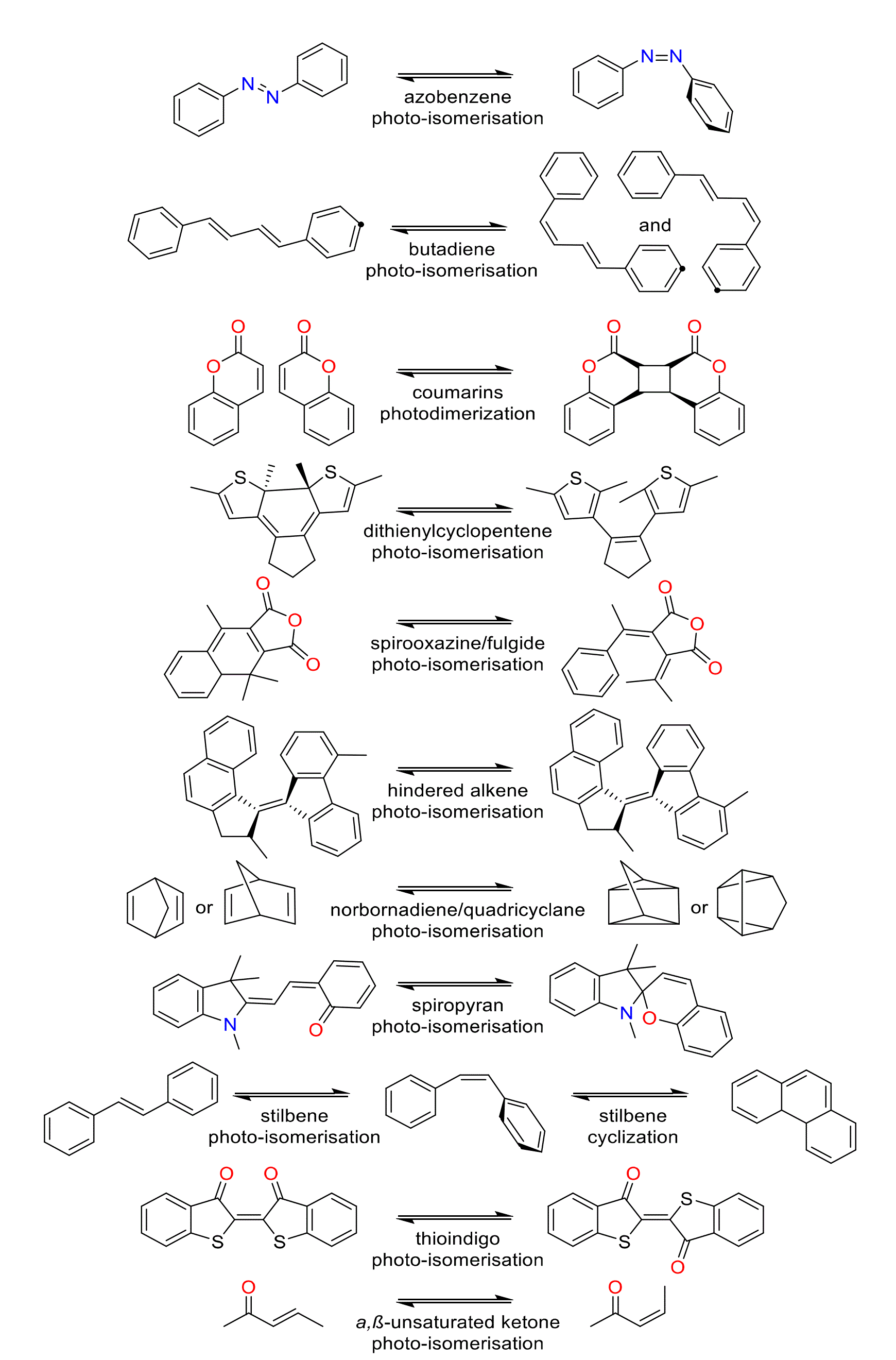
Photoswitchable Molecules: Upon irradiation with light, photoisomerization occurs, changing the spatial geometry and properties of the molecule.

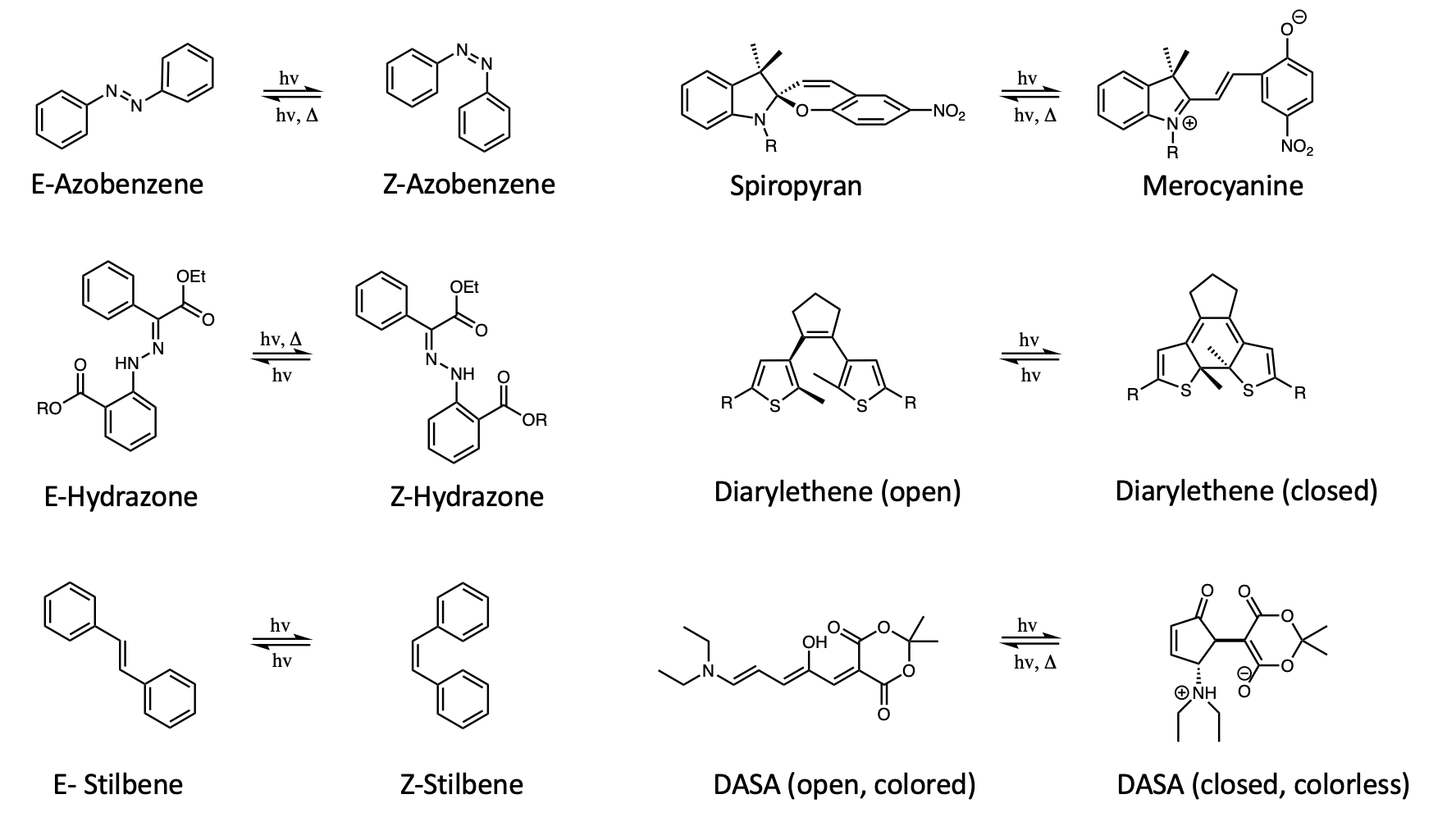
Photoswitchable molecules: Azobenzene undergoes a E to Z photoisomerization in which the Z isomer is more polar, has shorter bonds, and a bent and twisted geometry. Hydrazone undergoes photoisomerization with long thermal half lives of thousands of years. Spiropyran and Merocyanine undergo ring opening/closing mechanisms upon photo irradiation. Diarylethene and donor-acceptor Stenhouse adducts exhibit changes in color upon photoisomerization. Stilbene is a model photoswitch for studying photochemistry.

A photochromic compound can change its configuration or structure upon irradiation with light. Several examples of photochromic compounds include: azobenzene, spiropyran, merocyanine, diarylethene, spirooxazine, fulgide, hydrazone, nobormadiene, thioindigo, acrylamide-azobenzene-quaternary ammonia, donor-acceptor Stenhouse adducts, stilbene, etc.

=== Isomerization ===
Upon isomerization from the absorption of light, a π-to-π^{*} or n-to-π^{*} electronic transition can occur with the subsequent release of light (fluorescence or phosphorescence) or heat when electrons transit from an excited state to a ground state. A photostationary state can be achieved when the irradiation of light no longer converts one form of an isomer into another; however, a mixture of cis- and trans- isomers will always exist with a higher percentage of one versus the other depending on the photoconditions.

==== Mechanism ====
Although the mechanism for photoisomerization is still debated amongst most scientists, increasing evidence supports cis-/trans- isomerization of polyenes favoring the hula twist rather than the one-bond-flip. The one-bond-flip isomerizes at the reactive double bond while the hula twist undergoes a conformational isomerization at the adjacent single bond. However, the interconversion of stereoisomers of stilbene proceeds via one-bond-flip.

==== Quantum yield ====
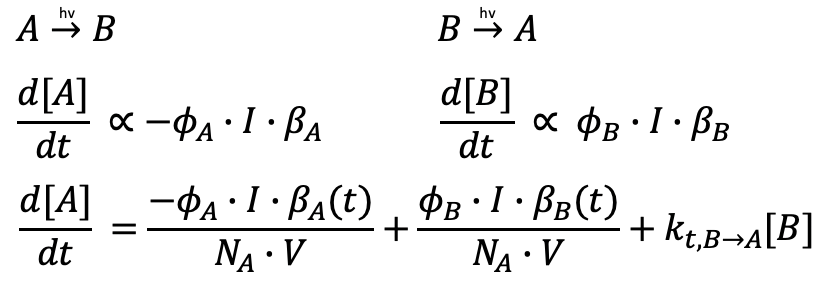
Photoisomerization from A to B: The three rates completely describe the isomerization from A to B where Φ_{A} is the quantum yield, I is the photon flux, β is the fraction of photons absorbed by A, N_{A} is the Avogadro constant, V is the volume of the sample.

One of the most important properties of a photoswitch is its quantum yield which measures the effectiveness of absorbed light to induce photoisomerization. Quantum yield is modeled and calculated using Arrhenius kinetics. Photoswitches can be in solution or in the solid state; however, switching in the solid state is more difficult to observe due to the lack of molecular freedom of motion, solid packing, and the fast thermal reversion to the ground state. Through chemical modification, red shifting the wavelengths of absorption needed to cause isomerization leads to low light induced switching which has applications in photopharmacology.

==== Catalysis ====
When a photochromic compound is incorporated into a suitable catalytic molecule, photoswitchable catalysis can result from the reversible changes in geometric conformation upon irradiation with light. As one of the most widely studied photoswitches, azobenzene has been shown to be an effective switch for regulating catalytic activity due to its isomerization from the E to Z conformation with light, and its ability to thermally relax back to the E isomer in dark conditions.

== Biological ==
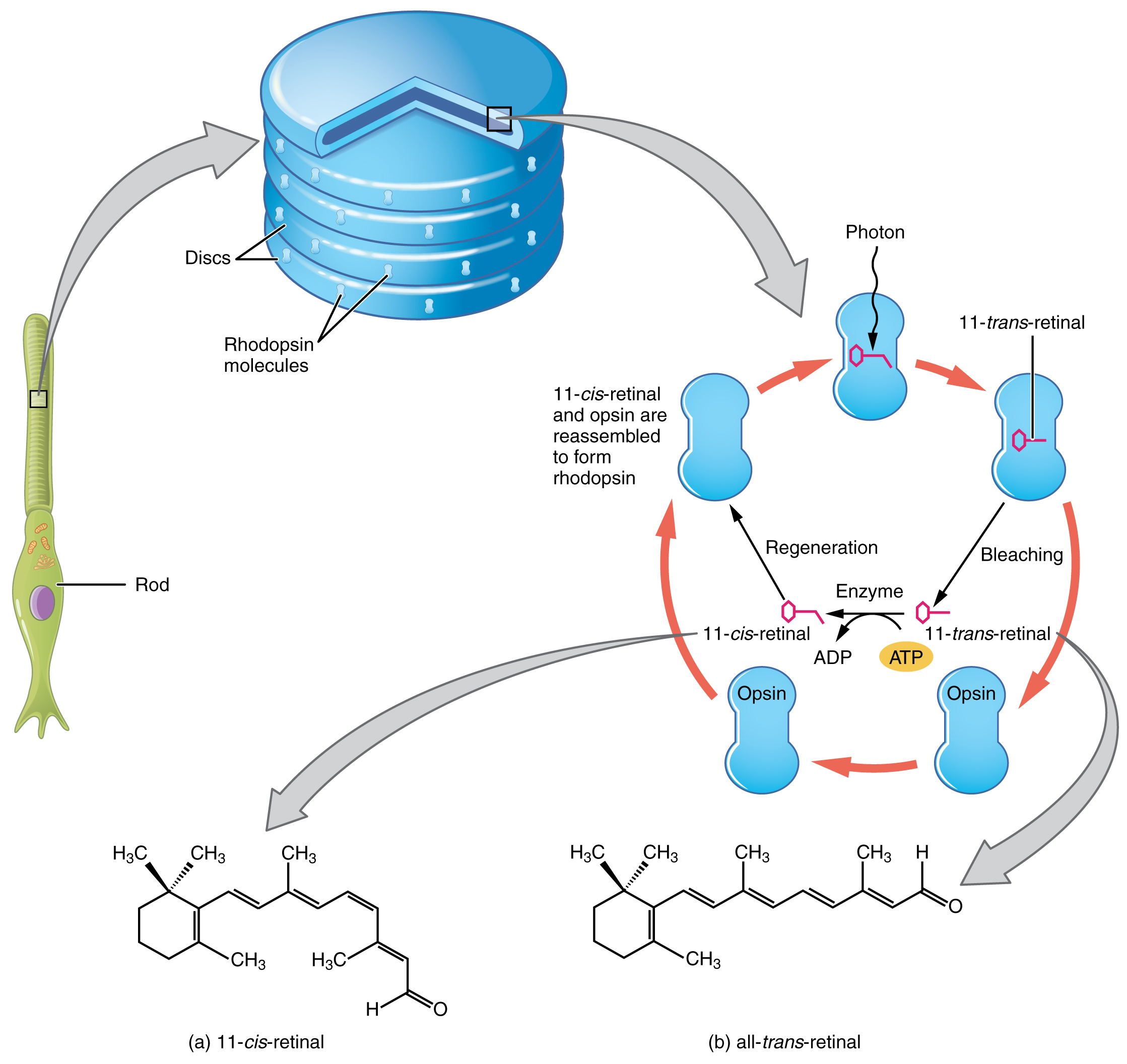
Retinal Photoswitch: The absorption of a photon converting cis-retinal to trans-retinal. Once converted, the trans-retinal can disassociate from Opsin. Once converted back to the cis- isomer, it can reform Rhodopsin.

=== Rhodopsins ===
One of the more prevalent biological examples in the human body that undergoes structural changes upon light irradiation includes the class of membrane-bound photoreceptors, Rhodopsins. These include the regulation of melanocytes, vision, the release of melatonin and the control of the circadian rhythm, etc. Rhodopsins are highly efficient photochromic compounds that can undergo fast photoisomerization and are associated with various retinal proteins along with light-gated channels and pumps in microbes.

=== Research ===
Advances in vision restoration with photochromic compounds has been investigated. Fast isomerization allows retinal cells to turn on when activated by light and advances in acrylamide-azobenzene-quaternary ammonia have shown restoration of visual responses in blind mice. Companies involved in this area include Novartis, Vedere, Allergan, and Nanoscope Therapeutics.

Through the incorporation of photoswitches into biological molecules, biological processes can be regulated through controlled irradiation with light. This includes photocontrol of peptide conformation and activity, transcription and translation of DNA and RNA, regulation of enzymatic activity, and photoregulated ion channels. For example, optical control of ligand binding in human serum albumin has been demonstrated to influence its allosteric binding properties. Also, red-shifted azobenzenes have been used to control ionotropic glutamate receptors.

== Potential applications ==
Photoswitches are studied in biology, materials chemistry, and physics and have a wide variety of potential applications, especially in the framework of nanotechnology.

=== Electronics ===
Depending on the isomeric state, photoswitches have the potential to replace transistors used in electronics. Through the attachment of photoswitches onto the surfaces of various substrates, the work function can be changed. For example, the incorporation of diarylethenes as a self-assembled monolayer on a gold surface shows promise in optoelectronic devices.

Diarylethenes form stable molecular conduction junctions when placed between graphene electrodes at low and room temperature and act as a photo-electrical switch. By combining a photoswitch, containing various highest and lowest unoccupied molecular orbital levels in its open and closed geometrical conformation, into a film composed of either p- or n-doped semiconductors, charge transport can be controlled with light. A photo-electric cell is connected to a circuit that measures how much electricity the cell generates. The circuit decides and gives the output, according to the setting of minimum and maximum lux level.

Photoswitches have been used in the generation of three-dimensional animations and images. The display utilizes a medium composed of a class of photoswitches (known as spirhodamines) and digital light processing technology to generate structured light in three dimensions. UV light and green light patterns are aimed at the dye solution, which initiates photoactivation and thus creates the 'on' voxel.

=== Energy storage ===
Due to one of the photoisomers being more stable than the other, isomerization from the stable to metastable isomer results in a conversion of light energy into free energy as a form of a chemical potential and has applications in storing solar energy.

Merocyanine has been shown to shuttle protons across a polymeric membrane upon irradiation with light. When UV and visible light were irradiated upon opposites sides of the membrane, a storage potential and pH gradient were generated.

=== Guest uptake and release ===
Incorporation of photoswitchable molecules into porous metal organic frameworks that can uptake of gaseous molecules like carbon dioxide as well as contribute to optoelectronics, nanomedicine, and better energy storage. By changing the chemical properties of the pores, adsorption and desorption of gases can be tuned for advancements in smart membrane materials.

=== Nanoreactors and cell mimics ===
Incorporation of photoswitching molecules such as donor-acceptor Stenhouse adducts into polymersomes has been used to form nanoparticles which can selectively expose enzymes in response to light, allowing them to mimic some functions of cells.

=== Liquid crystals ===
Chiral shape driven transformations in liquid crystal structures can be achieved through photoisomerization of bistable hydrazones to generate long term stable polymer shapes. Light-gated optical windows that can change the absorbance properties can be made by chirally doping liquid crystals with hydrazone photoswitches or by kinetically trapping various cholesteric states as a function of the photostationary state. Incorporation of photoswitches into nematic liquid crystals can change self-assembly, crystal packing, and the light reflecting properties of the supramolecular interactions.

=== Optical storage ===
Diarylethene photoswitches have been promising for use in rewritable optical storage. Through irradiation of light, writing, erasing, and reading can parallel CD/DVD storage with better performance. Novel azo-carrying photoswitches are introduced as molecular hinges, which can be used in the design of molecular machines and optical devices.

=== Photopharmacology ===
In the field of photopharmacology, photoswitches are being investigated as a means to control activity. By including a photoswitch in a drug, the drug assumes several biological active states. Light can be used to switch between these states, resulting in remote control of a drug's activity. Photoswitches have also been shown modulate surface energy properties which can control how the photoswitchable shell interacts with nanoparticles. Pharmaceutical encapsulation and distribution at targeted locations with light has been demonstrated due to the unique change in properties and size of microencapsulated nanostructures with photochromic components.

=== Self-healing materials ===
Photoswitches have been investigated for self-healable polymer materials. The first incorporates the phototunability of various functional groups so reactivity can be modulated in one of the isomeric forms, while the second strategy incorporates light-driven valence bond tautomerization.
