= Polymeric membrane =

Selective barrier made mainly from polymers

A polymeric membrane is a thin barrier made mainly from polymers that lets some substances pass through more easily than others. How well it separates depends on its structure, its chemical makeup and how it interacts with the substances being processed. Polymeric membranes are used in water purification, desalination, gas separation and industrial processing. They may have connected pores or a dense separating layer, and are usually made as flat sheets or hollow fibres.

== Materials and structure ==
Common membrane materials include cellulose acetate, polysulfone, polyethersulfone, polyvinylidene fluoride and polyamide. The choice depends on the separation required, the mechanical strength needed and resistance to chemicals and operating conditions. Symmetric membranes have a similar structure throughout their thickness. Asymmetric membranes vary through their thickness, usually with a thin separating layer on top of a more porous support. Thin-film composite membranes pair a separating layer with a separately made support, so the properties of each can be adjusted independently.

== Separation mechanisms ==
Porous membranes used in microfiltration and ultrafiltration separate suspended particles, microorganisms and large molecules mainly by size exclusion: whatever is too big to fit through the pores is held back. Nanofiltration and reverse osmosis membranes can hold back smaller dissolved substances, including salts, although how much is held back depends on the membrane and on what is being filtered. These processes are driven by a difference in pressure across the membrane; in reverse osmosis, that pressure must overcome the opposing osmotic pressure.

Performance is usually described by three measures:

- Flux – the amount passing through a unit area of membrane per unit time, measured under stated conditions such as the pressure across the membrane.
- Permeance – flux divided by the pressure driving it. For water in reverse osmosis, the osmotic pressure difference is taken into account.
- Rejection – how much the concentration of a dissolved substance is reduced on the far side of the membrane compared with the feed.

In dense polymer membranes used to separate gases, transport is usually described by the solution–diffusion model: gases dissolve in the polymer and then spread through it at different rates. Permeability reflects both how much gas dissolves and how fast it moves. Ideal selectivity is the ratio of the permeabilities of two gases. Many polymers show a trade-off: those that let more gas through tend to separate gases less well. This is shown empirically by the Robeson upper bound, which is used as a benchmark for comparing materials for gas separation.

== Manufacture and development ==
Polymeric membranes can be made by phase inversion, interfacial polymerization, stretching and electrospinning. In phase inversion, a polymer solution separates into two phases and solidifies into a membrane; the processing conditions affect the pore structure. Interfacial polymerization forms a thin polymer layer where two liquids meet, through reactions between the chemicals (monomers) dissolved in each. These methods allow control over membrane thickness, porosity and surface chemistry.

== Applications and limitations ==
Applications include drinking-water treatment, wastewater reclamation, seawater desalination, food and pharmaceutical processing, and industrial gas separations such as separating air and removing carbon dioxide from natural gas. Membranes are assembled into modules, such as bundles of hollow fibres or spiral-wound sheets, to provide a large membrane area in compact equipment.

A main limitation is fouling, where material blocks the pores or builds up on the membrane surface. Fouling reduces flux, increases energy use and means the membrane must be cleaned. Researchers are investigating surface modification, polymer blends and composite materials to resist fouling and keep separation performance over long periods. How well these approaches work depends on the feed mixture, the membrane chemistry and operating conditions.

== See also ==
- Synthetic membrane
- Inorganic membrane
- Zeolite membrane
