= MACBETH project =

European Commission project

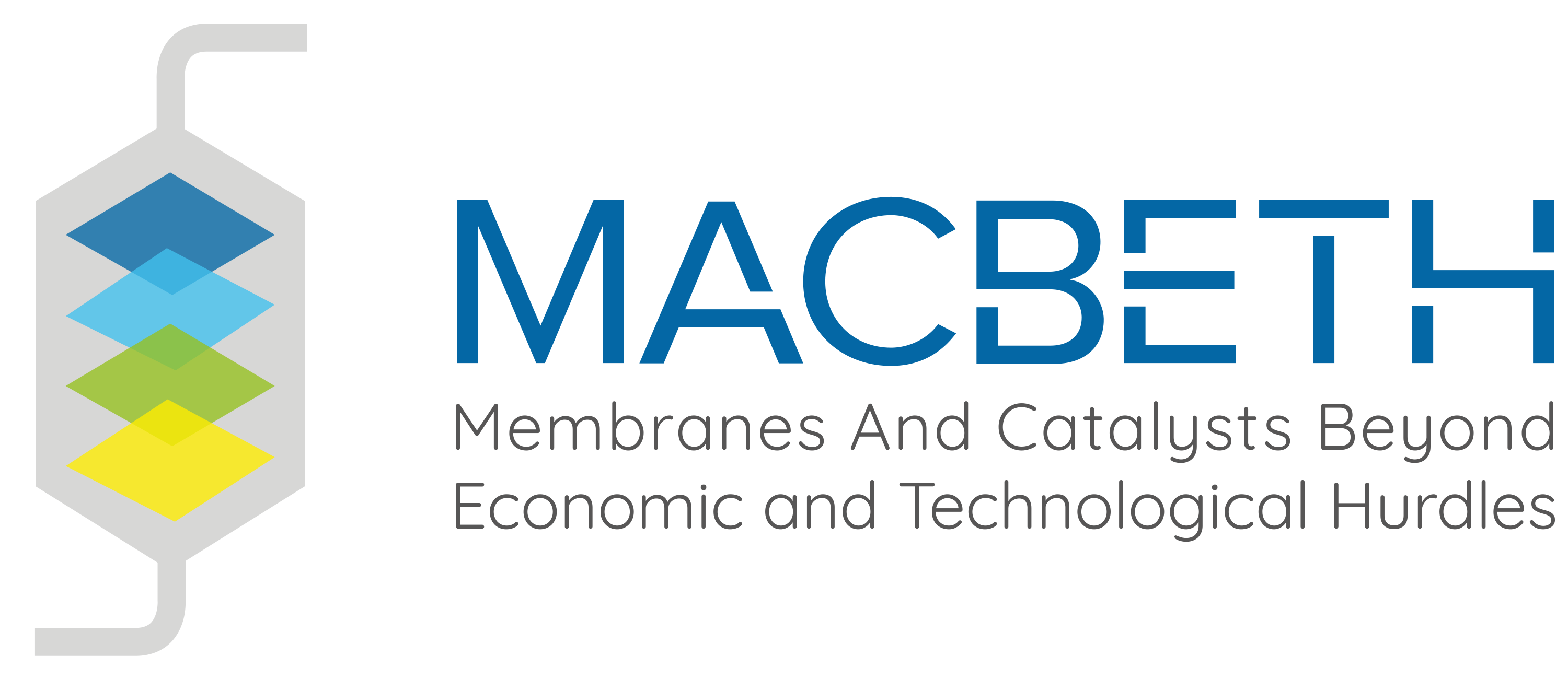
Logo of the MACBETH project

The MACBETH project is an innovation action project, funded by the European Commission in the Horizon 2020 initiative (Grant agreement ID: GA 869896). The goal of the project is to validate the industrial applicability of membrane reactor technology through the long-term operation of demo plants for the processes of hydroformylation, hydrogen production from steam reforming and propylene production via propane dehydrogenation at technology readiness level 7. In addition, the consortium aims to transfer this technology to biotechnology, in the selective enzymatic enrichment of omega-3 fatty acids.

== Project overview ==
The M.A.C.B.E.T.H. (acronym of Membranes And Catalysts Beyond Economic and Technological Hurdles) consortium includes 27 different partners among universities, companies and research institutes. The project started on November 1st, 2019 and it is expected to be concluded on October 31st, 2024. It has a total estimated cost of about 20.5 million euro, of which 80% have been provided by the European Commission.

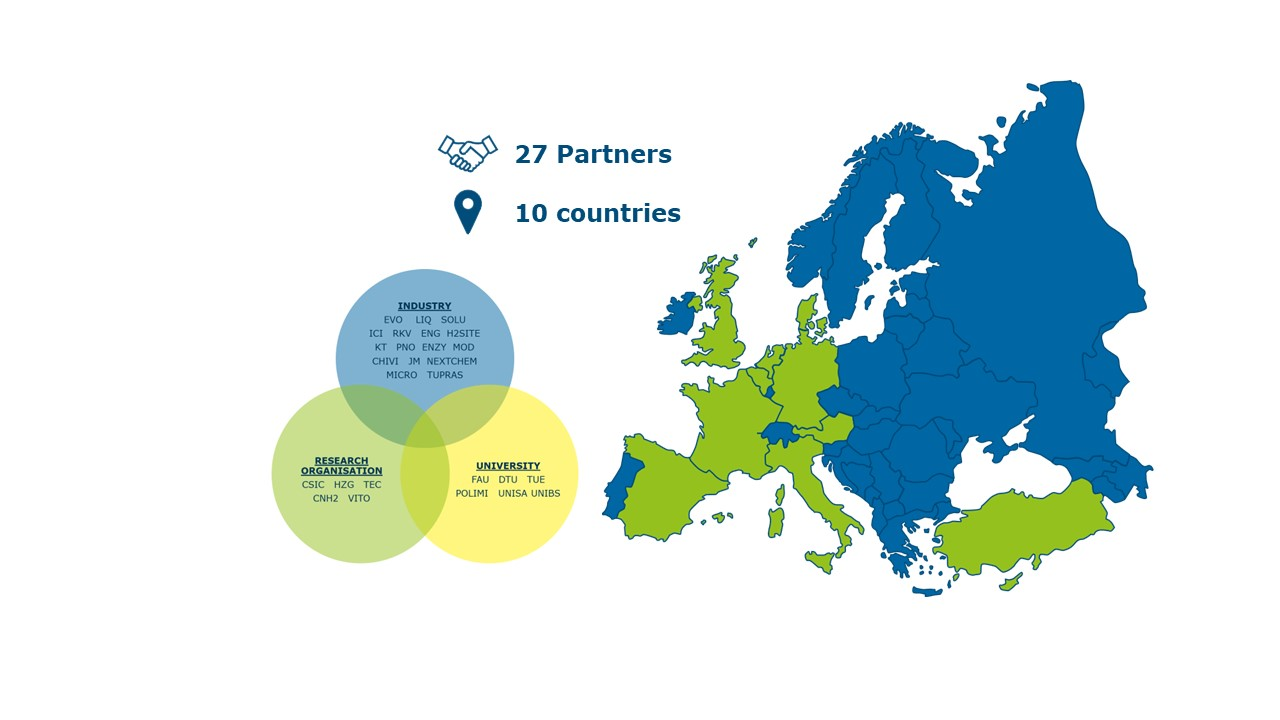
map of MACBETH project partners

The project has been proposed by the consortium to address the topic of downstream processes, which refers to the recovery and purification of products in process industry. Due to the high energy consumption typically associated with downstream processes, the idea of the project was to demonstrate the potentialities of a very broad applicable concept for an efficient integration of downstream operations in the overall process chain. In particular, combining the catalytic synthesis and the separation units in a single reactor, called membrane reactor.

The idea to substitute, in some application, a complex chain of downstream processes with a small, single, highly-efficient reactor lays under the concept of process intensification, which is any engineering development that allows to produce a certain product in a cleaner, safer and more efficient way.

To achieve this, the MACBETH consortium combines the catalytic synthesis step with the separation step via tailor-made catalysts and membranes, designing the membrane reactors and demonstrating their performance through long-term operations.

== Processes ==
=== Hydrogen production ===
Hydrogen production aims to generate a high-purity molecular-hydrogen gas for its use in hydrogenation reactions of hydrocarbons, in fuel cells for electricity production and in general as energy carrier to decarbonize several hard-to-abate sectors. In MACBETH, hydrogen will be produced through steam reforming of hydrocarbons. In particular, two different pathways will be developed:

- hydrogen produced from natural gas steam reforming, performed in a fluidized bed membrane reactor designed and built during the project. In this reactor, the heat duty for the endothermic reforming reactions is provided by external combustion of natural gas.
- hydrogen produced from biogas autothermal reforming, performed in an ad-hoc designed fluidized bed membrane reactor. In this process, together with biogas and steam, air is fed to the reactor, in order to provide the heat for the reforming reactions from the combustion of part of the methane in the biogas.

In both pathways, the presence of palladium-based membranes inside the dense region of the fluidized bed allows to strongly reduce the operating temperature of the reactor, and consequently the CAPEX and OPEX.

==== Scientific achievements ====
So far, some academic papers have been published regarding hydrogen production in membrane reactors, mainly regarding the development of metallic-supported dense membranes for hydrogen permeation. and regarding the modelling of fluidized bed membrane reactors

The two reactors are currently under construction and will be operative during 2024.

=== Propylene production via propane dehydrogenation ===
Propylene is a key building block for different chemicals, especially polymers as polypropylene. It is mainly produced by steam cracking and fluid catalytic cracking. However, its production route in which membrane reactors can have an important impact is propane dehydrogenation.

In this reaction, propane is decomposed into propylene and hydrogen. Palladium-based membranes remove the hydrogen molecules, thus allowing good propylene yields at reduced reactor temperature, mitigating the problem of coke formation.

==== Scientific achievements ====
The results of propane dehydrogenation investigations in MACBETH are mainly related to the development of a new platinum-based catalyst with high selectivity towards propylene production. and to the development of palladium-based membranes suitable for this process

Fixed bed reactor prototypes are currently under construction.

=== Hydroformylation ===
Hydroformylation is a key reaction in chemical industry to produce specialty chemicals as intermediate for detergents and plasticizers. In this reaction, syngas and olefins are converted to aldehydes.

In MACBETH, reaction is performed in an innovative catalytic membrane reactor, using polymeric membrane coated monoliths.

==== Scientific achievements ====
In hydroformylation process, some articles have been published about monolithic-supported liquid catalyst performance and about hydroformylation of 1-butene.

=== Bio catalytical oil cleavage ===
The bio-catalytical oil cleavage process consists in the enrichment, starting from a vegetable or fish oil, in the fraction of omega-3 fatty acids, particularly EPA and DHA. The conventional route for this enrichment process is through a total detachment of all fatty acids from the glycerol backbone. Acids, in form of ethyl esters, are then separated in different fractions using molecular distillation or other techniques.

In MACBETH, a selective lipase is used to selectively detach mainly short-chain acids, leaving EPA and DHA attached in glyceride form. The final enriched product can then be obtained by the separation of ethyl esters from glycerides, performed through a polymeric membrane.

==== Scientific achievements ====
Long term reactor trials have been performed so far, ensuring the feasibility of the process and determining the operating conditions to guarantee the longevity of the enzyme.

== MODELTA: MACBETH's spin-off on membrane reactors ==
Membrane technology and membrane reactors have the potential to be applied in several processes among different sectors, such as energy, chemistry and food industries. However, the evaluation of their applicability requires a background in different disciplines, such as material science, physics, engineering, math, together with sustainability and economic principles.

To try to fill the gap between university and industry, a spin-off named MODELTA B.V. has been established from the consortium in November 2022. Modelta is officially a spin-off of Politecnico di Milano and Eindhoven University of Technology, and provide consultancy and modelling services about membranes and membrane reactors.
