= Ceramic membrane =

Ceramic membranes are a type of artificial membranes made from inorganic materials (such as alumina, titania, zirconia oxides, silicon carbide or some glassy materials). They are used in membrane operations for liquid filtration.

By contrast with polymeric membranes, they can be used in separations where aggressive media (acids, strong solvents) are present. They also have excellent thermal stability which makes them usable in high-temperature membrane operations.

Like polymeric membranes, they are either dense or porous.

Researchers have studied ceramic membranes for potential applications in wastewater treatment, gas separation, and membrane reactors. Ceramic membranes typically last longer than polymeric membranes which are more commonly used for these applications. Currently ceramic membranes have not seen widespread usage mainly due to their high cost of production.

Configurations include tubular cross flow and dead-end membranes as well as flat sheet membranes.

== Dense membranes ==
Dense ceramic membranes are used for the purpose of gas separation. Examples are the separation of oxygen from air, or the separation of hydrogen gas from a mixture. Dense ceramic membranes have been studied for process intensification applications to reduce the energy consumption of many technologies used in the petroleum industry. One such application is membrane reactors, through the use of dense oxygen permeable membranes.

== Porous membranes ==
Porous ceramic membranes are chiefly used for gas separation and micro- or nanofiltration. They can be made from both crystalline as well as amorphous solids.

An example of an amorphous membrane is the silica membrane.

An example of a highly porous membrane is the type made of silicon carbide.

Porous ceramic membranes are typically manufactured through a slip coating-sintering process. In this process a support is initially made by sintering particles of a ceramic material into a mold with a binding agent. The surface of this support is then coated in a solution of finer ceramic particles and a polymeric binder. This coating is then sintered to form a porous layer of the membrane. This process can then be repeated to form new layers that are typically formed with smaller part ceramic particles. This repeated process with increasingly small particles creates an anisotropic membrane.

== History & manufacturers of ceramic membranes ==
The first ceramic membranes were produced in France in the 1980s for the purpose of uranium enrichment in the nuclear industry. After many of the nuclear plants were set up in France other industrial application areas for the ceramic membranes were sought out. At the same time academic research on ceramic membranes was conducted. The leading group was directed by Professor Louis Cot at the National Graduate School of Chemistry in Montpellier. The group growth gave rise to the creation of a laboratory fully dedicated to the membrane materials and processes from 1994 and to the European Membrane Institute of Montpellier in 2000.

While most of the ceramic membrane manufacturers produce the membranes of carriers and membrane layers of alumina oxide, titanium oxide and zirconia oxide only a few manufacturers work with silicon carbide. Silicon carbide requires higher sintering temperatures (>2000 °C) compared to oxide based membranes (1200-1600 °C).
