= Donor-acceptor Stenhouse adducts =

Class of photoswitching molecule

Donor-acceptor Stenhouse adducts (DASAs) are photoswitches which respond to light frequencies from the infrared through the ultraviolet. This means they are well suited for uses where visible light is preferable over other wavelengths, for example in biomedical settings where UV light can have cytotoxic effects. They were first reported as a class of photoswitching molecules by Helmy et al. in 2014.

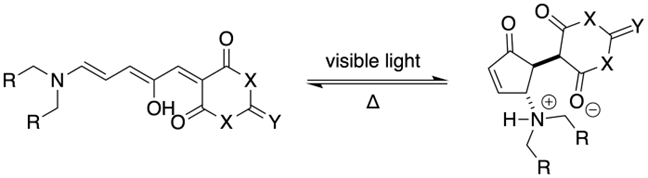
Photoswitching in first generation DASAs. The “open” form (left) is favored under dark equilibrium, whereas colorless “closed” form is favored upon irradiation with visible light.

Upon irradiation, a 4π-electrocyclisation reaction causes them to switch from their "open", linear triene-enol form to their "closed" cyclopentenone form. Thermal relaxation can cause reversion of this transition, returning the DASA to its original "open" conformation. These processes are in constant equilibrium, hence, the dark-equilibrium position of a DASA lies towards the “open” form, whereas the photostationary state lies towards the “closed” form.

DASAs are negative photochromes, meaning they become colorless upon photoswitching. Photoswitching also drives an increase in polarity and releases energy as heat.

While their translation into products is still in its early stages, DASAs are being researched for several applications. Research includes their use in chemical sensing, incorporation into hydrogels for drug delivery, cryptography, rewritable data storage, actuation of soft materials, and design of nanoreactors and cell mimics.
