= Photochromism =

Reversible chemical transformation by absorption of electromagnetic radiation

Photochromism is the reversible change of color upon exposure to light. It is a transformation of a chemical species (photoswitch) between two forms through the absorption of electromagnetic radiation (photoisomerization), where each form has a different absorption spectrum. This reversible structural or geometric change in photochromic molecules affects their electronic configuration, molecular strain energy, and other properties.

== History ==
In 1867, Carl Julius Fritzsche reported the concept of photochromism, indicating that orange tetracene solution lost its color in daylight but regained it in darkness. Later, similar behavior was observed by both Edmund ter Meer and Phipson. Ter Meer documented the color change of the potassium salt of dinitroethane, which appeared red in daylight and yellow in the dark. Phipson also recorded that a painted gatepost appeared black during the day and white at night due to a zinc pigment, likely lithopone. In 1899, Willy Markwald, who studied the reversible color change of 2,3,4,4-tetrachloronaphthalen-1(4H)-one in the solid state, named this phenomenon "phototropy". However, this term was later considered misleading due to its association with the biological process "phototropism". In 1950, Yehuda Hirshberg (from the Weizmann Institute of Science in Israel) proposed the term "photochromism", derived from the Greek words phos (light) and chroma (color), which remains widely used today. The synonym "tenebrescence" was coined by the RCA engineer Humboldt Leverenz in 1946, and continues to see occasional use in the field of minerology, where it was introduced by Philco scientist David Medved in 1954.

The phenomenon extends beyond colored compounds, encompassing systems that absorb light across a broad spectrum, from ultraviolet to infrared, and includes both rapid and slow reactions. Photochromism can take place in both organic and inorganic compounds, and also has its place in biological systems (for example retinal in the vision process). The use of photochromic materials has evolved beyond protective eyewear to applications including 3D optical data storage, photocatalysis, and radiation dosimetry.

== Principles ==
Photoisomerization of [Co(NH_{3})_{5}NO_{2}]^{2+}. Red-colored isomer (left) converts to the yellow isomer (right) upon UV irradiation.

Photochromism often is associated with pericyclic reactions, cis-trans isomerizations, intramolecular hydrogen transfer, intramolecular group transfers, dissociation processes and electron transfers (oxidation-reduction). Transition metal complexes can also display photochromic properties due to linkage isomerizations.

Important properties of photochromic compounds include quantum yield, fatigue resistance, and the lifetime of the photostationary state (PSS). The quantum yield of the photochemical reaction determines the efficiency of the photochromic change relative to the amount of light absorbed. In photochromic materials, the loss of photochromic component is referred to as fatigue, and it is observed by processes such as photodegradation, photobleaching, photooxidation, and other side reactions. All photochromic compounds suffer from fatigue to some extent, and its rate is strongly dependent on the activating light and the sample conditions. Photochromic materials have two states, and their interconversion can be controlled using different wavelengths of light. Excitation with any given wavelength of light will result in a mixture of the two states at a particular ratio, called the photostationary state. In a perfect system, there would exist wavelengths that can be used to provide 1:0 and 0:1 ratios of the isomers, but in real systems this is not possible, since the active absorbance bands always overlap to some extent.

Photochromic systems rely on irradiation to induce the isomerization. Some rely on irradiation for the reverse reaction, others use thermal activation for the reverse reaction.

== Classes of photochromic materials ==
=== Molecular photoswitches ===
Azobenzene	The photochromic trans-cis (E/Z) isomerization of azobenzenes has been used extensively in molecular switches. Upon isomerization, azobenzenes experience changes in physical properties, such as molecular geometry, absorption spectra, or dipole moment. Azobenzene groups incorporated into crown ethers give switchable receptors and azobenzenes.
Diarylethenes	Diarylethenes undergo a fully reversible transformation between "ring-open" and "ring-closed" isomeric forms when exposed to light of suitable wavelength. Diarylethene-based photoswitches exhibit high photofatigue resistance, enabling them to undergo many photoswitching cycles with minimal degradation. These compounds have been evaluate for long-lasting photochemical memory devices due to the thermal stability of both photoforms of diarylethenes.
Spiropyrans and spirooxazines	Spiropyrans, among the oldest photochromic compounds, are closely related to spirooxazines. Irradiation with UV light induce ring-opening, forming a colorful isomer. When the UV source is removed, the chromophore gradually relax to their colorless ground state, the carbon-oxygen bond reforms, and the molecule. This class of photochromes, in particular, is thermodynamically unstable in one form and revert to the stable form in the dark unless cooled to low temperatures.
Donor-acceptor Stenhouse adducts	DASAs are a class of organic photoswitches characterized by their responsiveness to visible light and negative photochromism (the loss of color upon irradiation). Unlike traditional switches like spiropyrans that typically require ultraviolet light for activation, DASAs can be toggled using visible light, making them more suitable for biological environments where UV exposure can cause cellular damage. Recent research has utilized DASA-functionalized polymers to create light-responsive nanocarriers, such as polymersomes, that allow for the "on-off" switchable release of encapsulated payloads when triggered by visible light.
Fulgides and Fulgimides	Similar to diarylethenes, the photochromic behavior of fulgides and fulgimides is based on 6π-electrocyclic ring-opening and ring-closing reactions. They are highly photochromic photoswitches and reversibly interconvert between two isomeric forms when exposed to light of different wavelengths. These compounds exhibit low photochemical fatigue, high thermal stability, as well as high conversion yields.
Hydrazones	Hydrazone photoswitches can be activated by light and undergo efficient and reversible E/Z isomerization around the C=N double bond.
Naphthopyrans	Certain naphthopyrans, such as 3,3-diphenyl-3H-naphthopyran, convert from their colorless form to a colored isomer via a ring-opening process. Such materials are used in self-darkening glasses.
Azoheteroarenes	Azoheteroarenes, structural analogues of azobenzene, are photoswitches capable of reversible E–Z photoisomerization. In these compounds, one or both phenyl rings of azobenzene are replaced by a heterocycle, while maintaining similar structural and mechanistic properties. Like azobenzenes, their thermal isomerization follows three main pathways: inversion, rotation, or tautomerization. Typically, the Z-isomer of azoheteroarenes exists as the metastable state. The incorporation of heteroatoms into the ring system enhances functionality as well as improves bioisosterism, polarity, lipophilicity, and solubility, making azoheteroarenes promising alternatives to azobenzenes.

=== Photochromic quinones ===
Some quinones, and phenoxynaphthacene quinone in particular, have photochromicity resulting from the ability of the phenyl group to migrate from one oxygen atom to another. Quinones with good thermal stability have been prepared, and they also have the additional feature of redox activity, leading to the construction of many-state molecular switches that operate by a mixture of photonic and electronic stimuli.

=== Inorganic photochromic materials ===
Many inorganic substances also exhibit photochromic properties, often with much better resistance to fatigue than organic photochromics. In particular, silver chloride is extensively used in the manufacture of photochromic lenses. Other silver and zinc halides are also photochromic. Yttrium oxyhydride is another inorganic material with photochromic properties.

Some inorganic photochromic materials include oxides such as BaMgSiO_{4}, Na_{8}[AlSiO_{4}]_{6}Cl_{2}, and KSr_{2}Nb_{5}O_{15}. Additionally, rare-earth (RE)-doped compounds like CaF_{2}:Ce, CaF_{2}:Gd, as well as transition metal oxides such as WO_{3}, TiO_{2}, V_{2}O_{5}, and Nb_{2}O_{5} have been explored. Photochromism in transition metal oxides is generally attributed to the redox reactions of the transition metal ion and the resulting electron transfer between its different valence states. When electrons are excited from the valence band to the conduction band, a hole is generated in the valence band. This photo-induced hole can decompose adsorbed water on the material's surface, producing protons. These protons can react with transition metal ions in different valence states, forming hydrogen-based compounds that exhibit color changes. Upon exposure to light of a different wavelength or an oxidizing atmosphere, the reduced transition metal ion can undergo re-oxidation.

Various forms of tungsten trioxide (WO_{3}), including bulk crystals, thin films, and quantum dots, have been studied for their photochromic properties. WO_{3} transitions between two optical states, shifting from transparent to blue when exposed to light, heat, or electricity. The reversible color change is associated with the tungsten center's ability to undergo oxidation-reduction reactions, alternating between different oxidation states (W^{6+} to W^{5+} or W^{5+} to W^{4+}).

Molybdenum trioxide (MoO_{3}) is widely used in UV sensing applications due to its selective absorption of UV light. Upon UV exposure, MoO_{3} undergoes a photochromic transformation, which can be reversed in the presence of an oxidizing agent. MoO_{3} nanosheets exhibit a stronger photochromic effect than the bulk materials due to enhanced carrier mobility and structural flexibility.

=== Photochromic coordination compounds ===
Photochromic coordination complexes are relatively rare compared to the organic compounds listed above. There are two major classes of photochromic coordination compounds: those based on sodium nitroprusside and the ruthenium sulfoxide compounds. The ruthenium sulfoxide complexes were created and developed by Rack and coworkers. The mode of action is an excited-state isomerization of a sulfoxide ligand on a ruthenium polypyridine fragment from S to O or O to S. The difference in bonding between Ru and S or O leads to the dramatic color change and change in Ru(III/II) reduction potential. The ground state is always S-bonded, and the metastable state is always O-bonded. Typically, absorption maxima changes of nearly 100 nm are observed. The metastable states (O-bonded isomers) of this class often revert thermally to their respective ground states (S-bonded isomers), although a number of examples exhibit two-color reversible photochromism. Ultrafast spectroscopy of these compounds has revealed exceptionally fast isomerization lifetimes ranging from 1.5 nanoseconds to 48 picoseconds.

== Applications: sunglasses and related materials ==
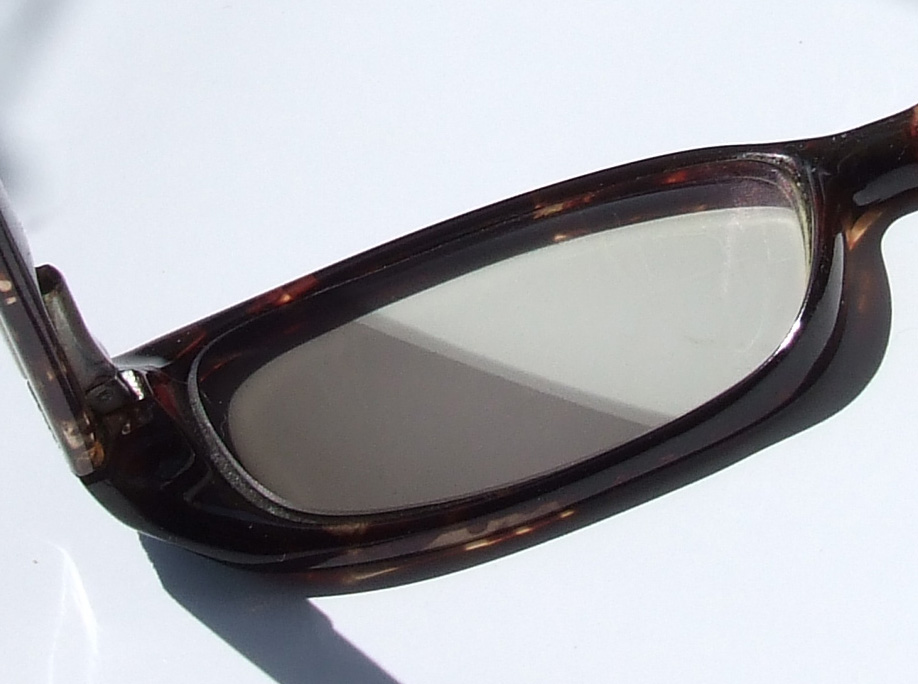
A photochromic eyeglass lens, after exposure to sunlight while part of the lens remained covered by paper.

Reversible photochromism is the basis of color changing lenses for sunglasses. The largest limitation in using photochromic technology is that the materials cannot be made stable enough to withstand thousands of hours of outdoor exposure so long-term outdoor applications are not appropriate at this time.

Reversible photochromic dyes are used commercially in applications such as inks, labels, and textiles, where the material is colorless indoors and develops color within seconds of UV exposure outdoors, reverting to colorless within minutes once removed from the light source. Photochromic dyes can also be compounded into plastics as a masterbatch, with color intensity increasing with material thickness.

The switching speed of photochromic dyes is highly sensitive to the rigidity of the environment around the dye. As a result, they switch most rapidly in solution and slowest in the rigid environment like a polymer lens. In 2005 it was reported that attaching flexible polymers with low glass transition temperature (for example siloxanes or polybutyl acrylate) to the dyes allows them to switch much more rapidly in a rigid lens. Some spirooxazines with siloxane polymers attached switch at near solution-like speeds even though they are in a rigid lens matrix.

== Aspirational applications ==
=== Data storage ===
Photochromic compounds for data storage has long been a topic of speculation. The area of 3D optical data storage promises discs that can hold a terabyte of data.

=== Solar energy storage ===
Photochromism is a potential mechanism to store solar energy. The photochromic dihydroazulene–vinylheptafulvene system is a proof-of-concept.

== See also ==
- Photosensitive glass
- Hexaarylbiimidazole
