= Hexaarylbiimidazole =

Class of chemical compounds

Chemical structure of a hexaarylbiimidazole

Hexaarylbiimidazoles (HABIs) are a class of organic compounds that are imidazole derivatives. In their natural state, HABIs are typically colorless, but when ultraviolet light breaks the bond connecting the two imidazole groups in the molecule, it produces a version that is dark blue. The transformation takes ten seconds or longer. By adding naphthalene to the compound, the color transition can be made in about 180 milliseconds. The cyclophane version of HABI reverts to colorless just as fast as the UV light is off.

== See also ==
- Photochromism
