= Zeolite membrane =

Synthetic membrane

A zeolite membrane is a synthetic membrane made of crystalline aluminosilicate materials, typically aluminum, silicon, and oxygen with positive counterions such as Na^{+} and Ca^{2+} within the structure. Zeolite membranes serve as a low energy separation method. They have recently drawn interest due to their high chemical and thermal stability, and their high selectivity. Currently zeolites have seen applications in gas separation, membrane reactors, water desalination, and solid state batteries. Currently zeolite membranes have yet to be widely implemented commercially due to key issues including low flux, high cost of production, and defects in the crystal structure.

== Production methods ==
There are several methods used for the formation of zeolite membranes.

The in situ method involves zeolite membranes being formed on microporous supports of various materials, typically aluminum oxide or stainless steel. These supports are then immersed in a solution of aluminum and silicon at a specific stoichiometric ratio. The conditions of this solution, including pH, ionic strength, temperature, and the addition of structure-determining reagents, can affect the formation of the zeolite membrane. Upon heating the solution, the crystals of the membrane begin to grow on the supports.

In 2012, a “seeding method” was developed to produce zeolite membranes. In this case, the support is seeded with preformed zeolite crystals, before immersing it in the solution. These crystals allow for the formation of thinner membranes that typically contain fewer defects by growing the membranes off of existing structures.

== Properties ==
Zeolite membranes drew initial interest as a separation method due to their high thermal and chemical stabilities. The crystal structure of zeolite membranes also creates a uniform pore size of approximately .3-1.3 nm in diameter. The crystal structure of zeolites also leads to the presence of several defects, which can often create gaps in the structure larger than these pores. The presence of defects can make these membranes far less effective, and it is difficult to produce defect free zeolite membranes.

There are several mechanisms of transport that govern the separation of molecules by zeolite membranes. The main mechanisms for separation by zeolite membranes are molecular sieving, diffusion, and adsorption. Molecular sieving involves the rejection of any molecules of a size greater than the pore size of the membrane. This is a relatively simple sieving process which can separate very large molecules. Adsorption involves molecules passing through the pores of the membrane being adsorbed onto the membrane surface. Adsorption properties of the membranes can be changed by adjusting various structural properties of the membrane.

Surface diffusion is a process in which molecules adsorb to the pore wall of the membrane, and are slowly transported through the pores. During surface diffusion, molecules that are adsorbed at a higher rate can begin to block the membrane pores from other, less adsorbed, molecules. Surface diffusion can account for the high selectivity of certain molecules such as hydrogen by zeolite membranes. Surface diffusion typically plays a larger role in the transport of molecules at lower temperatures.

Knudsen diffusion also contributes to the varying selectivity of zeolite membranes towards different molecules. Knudsen diffusion takes place when molecules are momentarily adsorbed to the pore wall and are then reflected off the surface in a random direction. This random motion allows for separation of molecules based on their velocities. Graham's law for diffusion dictates that lighter molecules will have a higher average velocity than heavier molecules, thus resulting in an increased flux with respect to lighter molecules. These differences in flux can be used to separate different molecules using zeolite membranes.

== Applications ==
=== Gas separation ===
Zeolite membranes have seen the most promise in regards to gas separation applications. The ability of zeolite membranes to adsorb certain molecules to its surface under varying conditions allows for researchers to perform highly selective separations. Adsorbed molecules block diffusion pores, and prevent the diffusion of other molecules through these pores. Zeolites typically adsorb carbon dioxide at the highest rate, lending themselves to use in carbon dioxide capture and separation. Diffusion selectivity governs the separation of molecules in zeolite membranes at higher temperatures. Diffusion selectivity allows for the quicker diffusion of smaller molecules through the membrane and slower diffusion of large molecules through the membrane's pores.

The natural gas industry has seen the introduction of zeolite membranes for the separation of methane, carbon dioxide, and hydrogen gasses. Zeolites provide the advantage of thermal stability and higher selectivity when compared to polymer membranes that have typically been used for these purposes. There still needs to be improvement in the production of zeolite membranes, particularly regarding the cost, before they see widespread use.

=== Membrane reactors ===
Zeolite membranes have also been used in membrane reactors, since their chemical and thermal stabilities allow them to withstand reaction conditions. Membrane reactors function by removing the product of a reaction as the reaction occurs. This removal shifts the equilibrium of the reaction to allow for the formation of more products, as outlined by Le Chatelier's principle creating a more efficient reaction process. The high selectivity of zeolite membranes allows for them to be used to remove products from a reactor at high rates.

=== Water desalination ===
Zeolite membranes have recently been studied as an alternative for energy efficient water desalination. Currently water desalination is primarily done by Reverse Osmosis filtration which uses a dense polymeric membrane to purify the water. Zeolite membranes have been tested as an alternative water purification method, and are able to separate water from impurities. Zeolites have not been implemented for industrial water desalination purposes primarily due to their high cost when compared to traditional reverse osmosis membranes.
