= Fulgide =

Class of photochromic organic compounds

General chemical structure of fulgides in the uncyclized form. In order to cyclize, at least one of the four R groups must be an aryl group.

In organic chemistry, a fulgide is any of a class of photochromic compounds consisting of a bismethylene-succinic anhydride core that has an aromatic group as a substituent. The highly conjugated system is a good chromophore. It can undergo reversible photoisomerization induced by ultraviolet light, converting between the E and Z isomers, both of which are typically colorless compounds. Unlike the more-stable Z isomer, the E isomer can also undergo a photochemically-induced electrocyclic reaction, forming a new ring and becoming a distinctly colored product called the C form. It is thus the two-step Z–C isomerization that is the photochromic change starting from the stable uncyclized form.

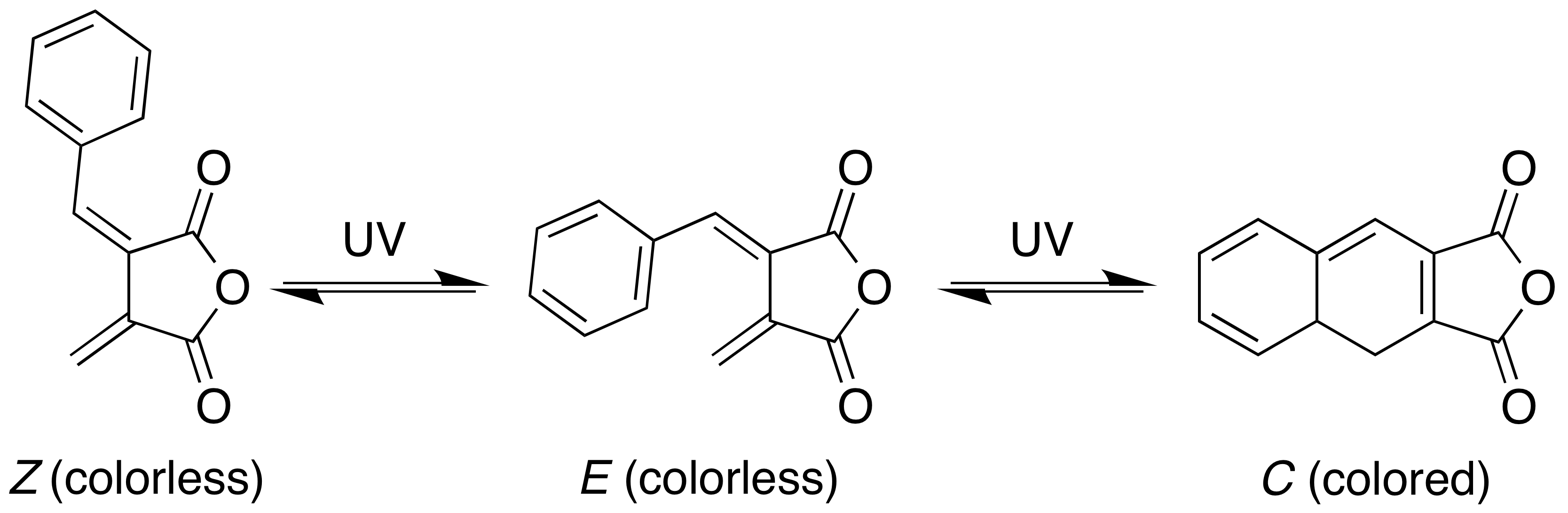

== History ==
The first compound of this class was synthesized in 1906 (by Hans Stobbe, using the Stobbe condensation), with the name based on the Latin word fulgere, meaning "to shine", for the shiny and large variety of colors of the crystal. The photochromic mechanism of fulgide was reported in 1968. It was not until 1981 that derivatives of fulgide, which made thermally stable photoisomerization, was reported. By editing both non-aromatic substituents and aromatic substituent, fulgide derivatives that are high in thermal stability and photostability were synthesized.

== Derivatives ==
Various other carbonyl structures have been studied, in addition to the original succinic anhydride. The goals include controlling various chemical properties, photochemical properties, and embedding of this structural motif in more complex molecules.

=== Fulgimide ===
General chemical structure of fulgiimdes

Fulgimide is an analog that has succinimide instead of succinic anhydride. It has nearly the same photochromic properties, but the imide is substantially more stable than the carboxylic acid anhydride towards hydrolysis. It also involves a less-complicated synthetic process for attaching substituents onto the structural core. The nitrogen atom provides a point of attachment for chains that can be cross-linked to form polymers.

=== Fulgenolide ===
Fulgenolide is a lactone analog: one of the two succinic anhydride carbonyl groups is replaced by an alkyl link. Fulgenolides have a larger quantum yield than other fulgide derivative and has a λ_{max} of the C form in near IR-region.

=== Fulgenate ===
Fulgenate is a diester analog. However, fulgenates do not have photochromic characteristics.
