= Photosensitive glass =

Clear glass with microscopic metal particles sensitive to UV light

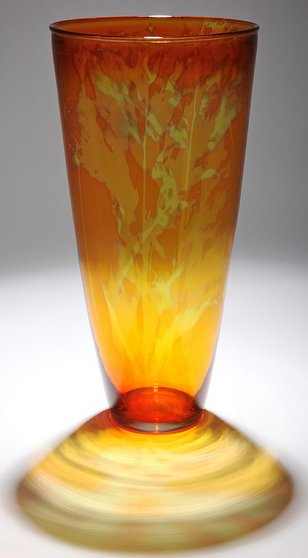
Photosensitive glass vase

Photosensitive glass, also called photostructurable glass (PSG) or photomachinable glass, is a glass in the lithium-silicate family of glasses onto which images can be etched using shortwave radiations, such as ultraviolet. Photosensitive glass was first discovered by S. Donald Stookey in 1937.

== Exposure process ==
When the glass is exposed to UV light with wavelengths between 280 and 320 nm, a latent image is formed. The glass remains transparent at this stage, but its ability to absorb UV light increases. This increased absorption is only detectable using UV transmission spectroscopy and is caused by an oxidation–reduction reaction that occurs inside the glass during exposure. This reaction causes cerium ions to oxidize to a more stable state, and silver ions are reduced to silver.

== Post-exposure heat treatment ==
The latent image captured in the glass is made visible by heating. This heat treatment is done by raising the temperature to about 500 °C to allow the oxidation–reduction reaction to form silver nanoclusters. Following this, the temperature is raised to 550–560 °C, and lithium metasilicate (Li_{2}SiO_{3}) forms on the silver nanoclusters. This material forms in the crystalline phase.

== HF chemical etching ==
The lithium metasilicate in the exposed regions of the glass can be etched by hydrofluoric acid (HF). This forms glass microstructures with a roughness in the range of 5 μm, resulting in a three-dimensional image of the mask to be produced. to 0.7 μm.

== See also ==
- Photochromic lens
