= Photochromic lens =

Optical lenses that darken on exposure to certain wavelengths of light

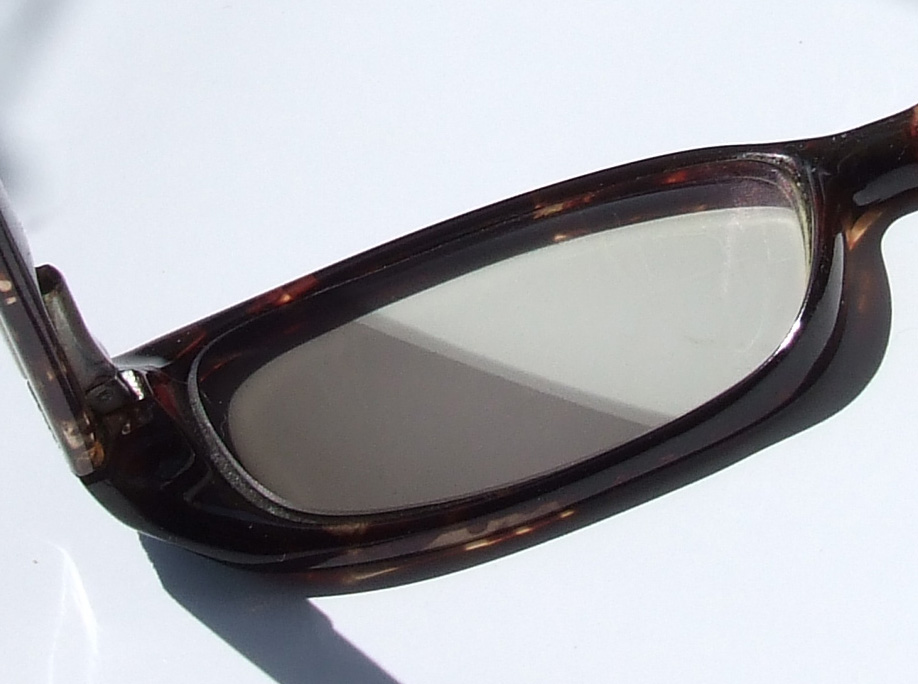
A photochromic eyeglass lens, part of the lens darkened after exposure to sunlight while the other part remained covered

A photochromic lens is an optical lens that darkens on exposure to light of sufficiently high frequency, most commonly ultraviolet (UV) radiation. In the absence of activating light, the lenses return to their clear state. Photochromic lenses may be made of polycarbonate, or another plastic. Glass lenses use visible light to darken. They are principally used in glasses that are dark in bright sunlight, but clear, or more rarely, lightly tinted in low ambient light conditions. They darken significantly within about a minute of exposure to bright light and take somewhat longer to clear. A range of clear and dark transmittances is available. Two kinds of photochromic lenses were popularized, the first being glass containing silver halides. These silver-based lenses became largely obsolete with the introduction of photochromic organic compounds. The other type are plastic, usually polycarbonate combined with photochromic organic compounds. These processes are reversible; once the lens is removed from strong sources of UV rays the photochromic compounds return to their transparent state.

== Photochromic glass ==
In the silver-based technology, silver chloride or other silver halides are embedded in the lenses. They are transparent to visible light without significant ultraviolet component, which is normal for artificial lighting. Photochromic lenses were developed by William H. Armistead and Stanley Donald Stookey at the Corning Glass Works Inc. in the 1960s. The glass version of these lenses achieves their photochromic properties through the embedding of microcrystalline silver halides (usually silver chloride) in a glass substrate. In glass lenses, when in the presence of UV-A light (wavelengths of 320–400 nm) electrons from the glass combine with the colourless silver cations to form elemental silver. Because elemental silver is visible, the lenses appear darker.

$$\ce{AgCl + e^- <=> Ag + Cl^-}$$

In the shade, this reaction is reversed. With the photochromic material dispersed in the glass substrate, the degree of darkening depends on the thickness of glass, which poses problems with variable-thickness lenses in prescription glasses.

== Photochromic plastic ==
Photochromic cycling lens clear under low-light	Photochromic cycling lens darkened in sunlight
Clear state under low-light conditions	Darkened state in sunlight

In another sort of technology, organic photochromic molecules, when exposed to ultraviolet (UV) rays as in direct sunlight, undergo a structural change that causes them to absorb a significant percentage of the visible light, i.e., they darken. Plastic photochromic lenses use oxazines and naphthopyrans to achieve the reversible darkening effect. These lenses darken when exposed to ultraviolet light of the intensity present in sunlight, but not in artificial light. With plastic lenses, the material is typically embedded into the surface layer of the plastic in a uniform thickness of up to 150 μm.

=== Variables ===
Typically, photochromic lenses darken substantially in response to UV light in less than one minute, and continue to darken a little more over the next fifteen minutes. The lenses begin to clear in the absence of UV light, and will be noticeably lighter within two minutes, mostly clear within five minutes, and fully back to their non-exposed state in about fifteen minutes. A report by the Institute of Ophthalmology at the University College London suggested that at their clearest photochromic lenses can absorb up to 20% of ambient light.

Because photochromic compounds fade back to their clear state by a thermal process, the higher the temperature, the less dark photochromic lenses will be. This thermal effect is called "temperature dependency" and prevents these devices from achieving true sunglass darkness in very hot weather. Conversely, photochromic lenses will get very dark in cold weather conditions. Once inside, away from the triggering UV light, the cold lenses take longer to regain their transparency than warm lenses.

A number of sunglass manufacturers and suppliers including INVU, BIkershades, Tifosi, Oakley, ZEISS, Serengeti Eyewear, and Persol provide tinted lenses that use photochromism to go from a dark to a darker state. They are typically used for outdoor sunglasses rather than as general-purpose lenses.

== See also ==
- Photosensitive glass
