= 3,3-Diphenyl-3H-naphthopyran =

Names
- Preferred IUPAC name 3,3-Diphenyl-3H-naphtho[2,1-b]pyran

Identifiers
CAS Number	4222-20-2
3D model (JSmol)	Interactive image
ChemSpider	2359442
ECHA InfoCard	100.111.746
EC Number	609-998-8
PubChem CID	3104870
CompTox Dashboard (EPA)	DTXSID0063365
- InChI: InChI=1S/C25H18O/c1-3-10-20(11-4-1)25(21-12-5-2-6-13-21)18-17-23-22-14-8-7-9-19(22)15-16-24(23)26-25/h1-18H Key: UBNNJVRNPJVYBU-UHFFFAOYSA-N
- SMILES: C1=CC=C(C=C1)C2(C=CC3=C(O2)C=CC4=CC=CC=C43)C5=CC=CC=C5

Properties
Chemical formula	C_{25}H_{18}O
Molar mass	334.418 g·mol^{−1}
Appearance	colorless solid
Melting point	158–160 °C (316–320 °F; 431–433 K)

Hazards
- GHS labelling
Pictograms	(GHS09: Environmental hazard)
Signal word	Warning
Hazard statements	H411
Precautionary statements	P273, P391, P501
- Except where otherwise noted, data are given for materials in their standard state (at 25 °C [77 °F], 100 kPa). Infobox references

3,3-Diphenyl-3H-naphthopyran is an organic compound that is the parent of several related naphthopyrans. This family of compounds are used as photochromic dyes in ophthalmic glasses. The compound is a colorless solid.

== Synthesis and reactions ==
The synthesis of naphthopyrans starts with 2-naphthol.

Upon exposure to UV-radiation, the pyran ring opens. The products, "photomerocyanines", are yellow to red dark colored.

Isomers of photomerocyanines derived from UV-radiation of 3,3-diphenyl-3H-naphthopyran.
