= Membrane reactor =

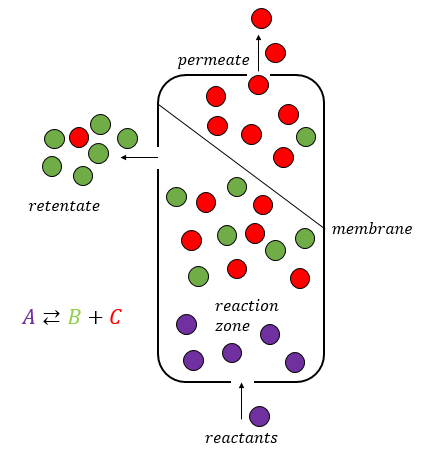
Sketch of a membrane reactor

A membrane reactor is a physical device that combines a chemical conversion process with a membrane separation process to add reactants or remove products of the reaction.

Chemical reactors making use of membranes are usually referred to as membrane reactors. The membrane can be used for different tasks:

- Separation
  - Selective extraction of products
  - Retention of the catalyst
- Distribution/dosing of a reactant
- Catalyst support (often combined with distribution of reactants)

Membrane reactors are an example for the combination of two unit operations in one step, e.g., membrane filtration with the chemical reaction. The integration of reaction section with selective extraction of a reactant allows an enhancement of the conversions compared to the equilibrium value. This characteristic makes membrane reactors suitable to perform equilibrium-limited endothermic reactions.

== Benefits and critical issues ==
Selective membranes inside the reactor lead to several benefits: reactor section substitutes several downstream processes. Moreover, removing a product allows to exceed thermodynamics limitations. In this way, it is possible to reach higher conversions of the reactants or to obtain the same conversion with a lower temperature.

Reversible reactions are usually limited by thermodynamics: when direct and reverse reactions, whose rate depends from reactants and product concentrations, are balanced, a chemical equilibrium state is achieved. If temperature and pressure are fixed, this equilibrium state is a constraint for the ratio of products versus reactants concentrations, obstructing the possibility to reach higher conversions.

This limit can be overcome by removing a product of the reaction: in this way, the system cannot reach equilibrium and the reaction continues, reaching higher conversions (or same conversion at lower temperature).

Nevertheless, there are several hurdles in an industrial commercialization due to technical difficulties in designing membranes with long stabilities and due to the high costs of membranes. Moreover, there is a lack of a process which lead the technology, even if in recent years this technology was successfully applied to hydrogen production and hydrocarbon dehydrogenation.

== Reactor configurations ==
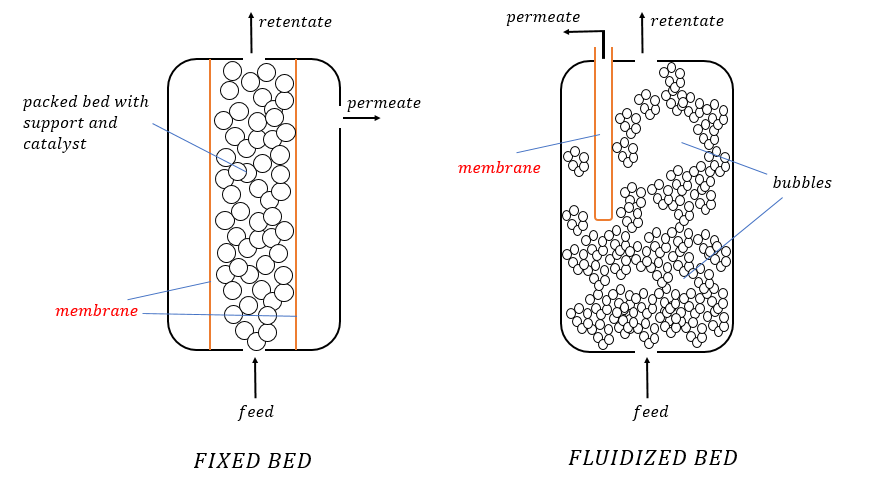
Packed bed and fluidized bed membrane reactors

Generally, membrane reactors can be classified based on the membrane position and reactor configuration. Usually there is a catalyst inside: if the catalyst is installed inside the membrane, the reactor is called catalytic membrane reactor (CMR); if the catalyst (and the support) are packed and fixed inside, the reactor is called packed bed membrane reactor; if the speed of the gas is high enough, and the particle size is small enough, fluidization of the bed occurs and the reactor is called fluidized bed membrane reactor. Other types of reactor take the name from the membrane material, e.g., zeolite membrane reactor.

Among these configurations, higher attention in recent years, particularly in hydrogen production, is given to fixed bed and fluidized bed: in these cases the standard reactor is simply integrated with membranes inside reaction space.

== Membrane reactors for hydrogen production ==
Today hydrogen is mainly used in chemical industry as a reactant in ammonia production and methanol synthesis, and in refinery processes for hydrocracking. Moreover, there is a growing interest in its use as energy carrier and as fuel in fuel cells.

More than 50% of hydrogen is currently produced from steam reforming of natural gas, due to low costs and the fact that it is a mature technology. Traditional processes are composed by a steam reforming section, to produce syngas from natural gas, two water gas shift reactors which enhance hydrogen in syngas and a pressure swing adsorption unit for hydrogen purification. Membrane reactors make a process intensification including all these sections in one single unit, with both economic and environmental benefits.

=== Membranes for hydrogen production ===
To be suitable for hydrogen production industry, membranes must have a high flux, high selectivity towards hydrogen, low cost and high stability. Among membranes, dense inorganic are the most suitable having a selectivity orders of magnitude bigger than porous ones. Among dense membranes, metallic ones are the most used due to higher fluxes compared to ceramic ones.

The most used material in hydrogen separation membranes is palladium, particularly its alloy with silver. This metal, even if is more expensive than other ones, shows very high solubility towards hydrogen.

The transport mechanism of hydrogen inside palladium membranes follows a solution/diffusion mechanism: hydrogen molecule is adsorbed onto t he surface of the membrane, then it is split into hydrogen atoms; these atoms go across the membrane through diffusion (see palladium hydride) and then recombine again into hydrogen molecule on the low-pressure side of the membrane; then, it is desorbed from the surface.

In recent years, several works were performed to study the integration of palladium membranes inside fluidized bed membrane reactors for hydrogen production.

== Other applications ==
=== Membrane bioreactors for wastewater treatment ===
Submerged and sidestream membrane bioreactors in wastewater treatment plants are the most developed filtration based membrane reactors.In the submerged arrangement, the membrane is positioned within the bioreactor, thus lowering the cost of operation as well as the area occupied. On the other hand, in the sidestream arrangement, the membrane is placed outside the bioreactor, hence easing cleaning. However, it increases the energy needed for pumping. The MBR technology is useful for replacing the traditional clarifiers since it retains all the biomass and generates high-quality effluent. Membrane fouling is, however, its greatest disadvantage.

=== Electrochemical membrane reactors ecMR ===
The production of chloride (Cl_{2}) and caustic soda NaOH from NaCl is carried out industrially by the chlor-alkali-process using a proton conducting polyelectrolyte membrane. It is used on large scale and has replaced diaphragm electrolysis. Nafion has been developed as a bilayer membrane to withstand the harsh conditions during the chemical conversion.

=== Biological systems ===
In biological systems, membranes fulfill a number of essential functions. The compartmentalization of biological cells is achieved by membranes. The semi-permeability allows to separate reactions and reaction environments. A number of enzymes are membrane bound and often mass transport through the membrane is active rather than passive as in artificial membranes, allowing the cell to keep up gradients for example by using active transport of protons or water.

The use of a natural membrane is the first example of the utilization for a chemical reaction. By using the selective permeability of a pig's bladder, water could be removed from a condensation reaction to shift the equilibrium position of the reaction towards the condensation products according to Le Chatelier's principle.

=== Size exclusion: Enzyme Membrane Reactor ===
As enzymes are macromolecules and often differ greatly in size from reactants, they can be separated by size exclusion membrane filtration with ultra- or nanofiltration artificial membranes. This is used on industrial scale for the production of enantiopure amino acids by kinetic racemic resolution of chemically derived racemic amino acids. The most prominent example is the production of L-methionine on a scale of 400t/a. The advantage of this method over other forms of immobilization of the catalyst is that the enzymes are not altered in activity or selectivity as it remains solubilized.

The principle can be applied to all macromolecular catalysts which can be separated from the other reactants by means of filtration. So far, only enzymes have been used to a significant extent.

=== Reaction combined with pervaporation ===
In pervaporation, dense membranes are used for separation. For dense membranes the separation is governed by the difference of the chemical potential of the components in the membrane. The selectivity of the transport through the membrane is dependent on the difference in solubility of the materials in the membrane and their diffusivity through the membrane. For example, for the selective removal of water by using lipophilic membranes. This can be used to overcome thermodynamic limitations of condensation, e.g., esterification reactions by removing water.

=== Dosing: Partial oxidation of methane to methanol ===
In the STAR process for the catalytic conversion of methane from natural gas with oxygen from air, to methanol by the partial oxidation
2CH_{4} + O_{2} $\rightarrow$ 2CH_{3}OH.

The partial pressure of oxygen has to be low to prevent the formation of explosive mixtures and to suppress the successive reaction to carbon monoxide, carbon dioxide and water. This is achieved by using a tubular reactor with an oxygen-selective membrane. The membrane allows the uniform distribution of oxygen as the driving force for the permeation of oxygen through the membrane is the difference in partial pressures on the air side and the methane side.

Outlook and future perspectives

Membrane reactors are a key process intensification strategy, enabling thermodynamic limitations to be overcome and downstream processing to be simplified. Despite their advantages—higher conversions, lower operating temperatures, and reduced process steps—industrial implementation remains limited due to challenges in membrane stability, selectivity, and cost, especially under harsh operating conditions. Current research focuses on palladium-based membranes for hydrogen production, fluidized bed membrane reactors, and biological or electrochemical applications. Advances in materials science and manufacturing are expected to facilitate their deployment in the hydrogen economy and renewable chemical production in the medium to long term.
