= Diethyl diethylmalonate =

Names
- IUPAC name diethyl 2,2-diethylpropanedioate
- Other names: Diethyl diethylmalonate; Diethyl 2,2-diethylmalonate.

Identifiers
| CAS Number | 77-25-8 |
| 3D model (JSmol) | Interactive image |
| ChemSpider | 21159400 |
| ECHA InfoCard | 100.000.925 |
| EC Number | 201-016-2 |
| PubChem CID | 66165 |
| UNII | CEH13944YQ |
| CompTox Dashboard (EPA) | DTXSID0058807 |
- InChI: InChI=1S/C11H20O4/c1-5-11(6-2,9(12)14-7-3)10(13)15-8-4/h5-8H2,1-4H3 Key: ZKBBUZRGPULIRN-UHFFFAOYSA-N; InChI=1S/C11H20O4/c1-5-11(6-2,9(12)14-7-3)10(13)15-8-4/h5-8H2,1-4H3
- SMILES: CCC(CC)(C(=O)OCC)C(=O)OCC

Properties
| Chemical formula | C_{11}H_{20}O_{4} |
| Molar mass | 216.277 g·mol^{−1} |
- Except where otherwise noted, data are given for materials in their standard state (at 25 °C [77 °F], 100 kPa). Infobox references

Diethyl diethylmalonate or diethyl 2,2-diethylmalonate is a derivative of diethyl malonate. It can be used in the synthesis of barbital.

== Uses ==
As being a diethyl malonate derivative, it can be combined with urea under the action of a strong base to form a barbiturate. In this case, diethyl diethylmalonate plus urea forms barbital under the action of sodium ethoxide.
