= Germacrene-A synthase =

Identifiers
- EC no.: 4.2.3.23

Databases
- IntEnz: IntEnz view
- BRENDA: BRENDA entry
- ExPASy: NiceZyme view
- KEGG: KEGG entry
- MetaCyc: metabolic pathway
- PRIAM: profile
- PDB structures: RCSB PDB PDBe PDBsum
Search
- PMC: articles
- PubMed: articles
- NCBI: proteins

The enzyme germacrene-A synthase (EC 4.2.3.23) catalyzes the chemical reaction

(2E,6E)-farnesyl diphosphate $\rightleftharpoons$ (+)-(R)-gemacrene A + diphosphate

This enzyme belongs to the family of lyases, specifically those carbon-oxygen lyases acting on phosphates. The systematic name of this enzyme class is (2E,6E)-farnesyl-diphosphate diphosphate-lyase [(+)-(R)-germacrene-A-forming]. Other names in common use include germacrene A synthase, (+)-germacrene A synthase, (+)-(10R)-germacrene A synthase, GAS, 2-trans,6-trans-farnesyl-diphosphate diphosphate-lyase, (germacrene-A-forming).
