= Photostationary state =

Equilibrium chemical composition under a specific kind of electromagnetic irradiation

The photostationary state of a reversible photochemical reaction is the equilibrium chemical composition under a specific kind of electromagnetic irradiation (usually a single wavelength of visible or UV radiation).

It is a property of particular importance in photochromic compounds, often used as a measure of their practical efficiency and usually quoted as a ratio or percentage.

The position of the photostationary state is primarily a function of the irradiation parameters, the absorbance spectra of the chemical species, and the quantum yields of the reactions. The photostationary state can be very different from the composition of a mixture at thermodynamic equilibrium. As a consequence, photochemistry can be used to produce compositions that are "contra-thermodynamic".

For instance, although cis-stilbene is "uphill" from trans-stilbene in a thermodynamic sense, irradiation of trans-stilbene results in a mixture that is predominantly the cis isomer. As an extreme example, irradiation of benzene at 237 to 254 nm results in formation of benzvalene, an isomer of benzene that is 71 kcal/mol higher in energy than benzene itself.

== Overview ==
Absorption of radiation by reactants of a reaction at equilibrium increases the rate of forward reaction without directly affecting the rate of the reverse reaction.

The rate of a photochemical reaction is proportional to the absorption cross section of the reactant with respect to the excitation source (σ), the quantum yield of reaction (Φ), and the intensity of the irradiation. In a reversible photochemical reaction between compounds A and B, there will therefore be a "forwards" reaction of $A \rightarrow B$ at a rate proportional to $\sigma_a \times \phi_{A\rightarrow B}$ and a "backwards" reaction of $B \rightarrow A$ at a rate proportional to $\sigma_b \times \phi_{B \rightarrow A}$. The ratio of the rates of the forward and backwards reactions determines where the equilibrium lies, and thus the photostationary state is found at:

$$\sigma_a \times \phi_{A\rightarrow B} / \sigma_b \times \phi_{B \rightarrow A}$$

If (as is always the case to some extent) the compounds A and B have different absorption spectra, then there may exist wavelengths of light where σ_{a} is high and σ_{b} is low. Irradiation at these wavelengths will provide photostationary states that contain mostly B. Likewise, wavelengths that give photostationary states of predominantly A may exist. This is particularly likely in compounds such as some photochromics, where A and B have entirely different absorption bands. Compounds that may be readily switched in this way find utility in devices such as molecular switches and optical data storage.

== Practical considerations ==
- Quantum yields of reaction (and to a lesser extent, absorption cross sections) are usually temperature and environment-dependent to some extent, and the photostationary state may therefore depend slightly on temperature and solvent as well as on the excitation.
- If thermodynamic interconversion of A and B can take place on a similar timescale to the photochemical reaction, it can complicate experimental measurements. This phenomenon can be important, for example in photochromatic eyeglasses.
