= Propylbarbital =

Chemical compound

Clinical data
- ATC code: None

Identifiers
- IUPAC name: 5,5-dipropyl-2,4,6(1H,3H,5H)-pyrimidinetrione
- CAS Number: 2217-08-5
- PubChem CID: 75192
- ChemSpider: 67738
- UNII: 9DCP1473WY
- CompTox Dashboard (EPA): DTXSID10176700
- ECHA InfoCard: 100.017.007

Chemical and physical data
- Formula: C_{10}H_{16}N_{2}O_{3}
- Molar mass: 212.249 g·mol^{−1}
- 3D model (JSmol): Interactive image
- SMILES: O=C1NC(=O)NC(=O)C1(CCC)CCC
- InChI: InChI=1S/C10H16N2O3/c1-3-5-10(6-4-2)7(13)11-9(15)12-8(10)14/h3-6H2,1-2H3,(H2,11,12,13,14,15); Key:RCOUWKSZRXJXLA-UHFFFAOYSA-N

Propylbarbital (Propal, Propanal, Proponal), also known as 5,5-dipropylbarbituric acid, is a barbiturate derivative used as a hypnotic drug.
