= Photoisomerization =

Chemical change induced by light

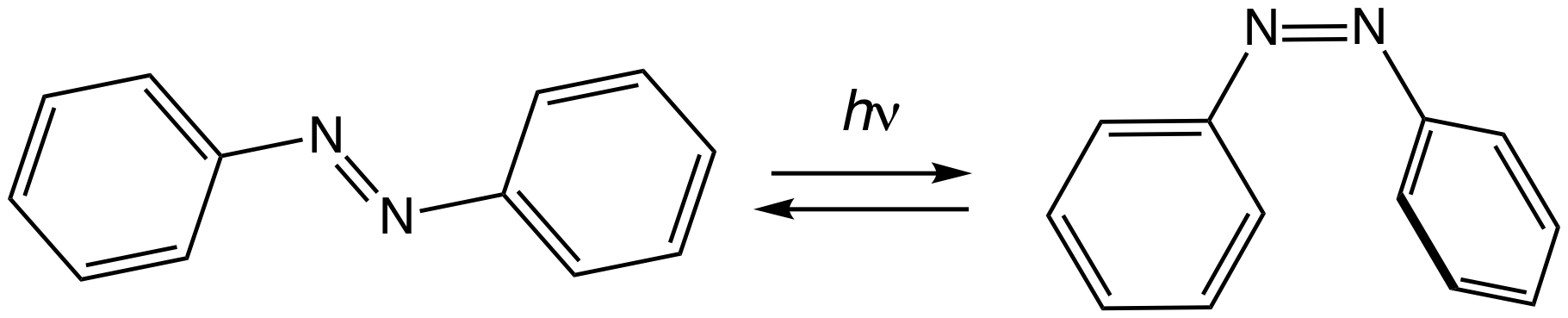
Photoisomerization of azobenzene

In chemistry, photoisomerization is a form of isomerization induced by photoexcitation. Both reversible and irreversible photoisomerizations are known for photoswitchable compounds. The term "photoisomerization" usually, however, refers to a reversible process.

== Applications ==
Photoisomerization of the compound retinal in the eye allows for vision.

Photoisomerizable substrates have been put to practical use, for instance, in pigments for rewritable CDs, DVDs, and 3D optical data storage solutions. In addition, interest in photoisomerizable molecules has been aimed at molecular devices, such as molecular switches, molecular motors, and molecular electronics.

Another class of device that uses the photoisomerization process is as an additive in liquid crystals to change their linear and nonlinear properties. Due to the photoisomerization is possible to induce a molecular reorientation in the liquid crystal bulk, which is used in holography, as spatial filter or optical switching.

Methyl red molecule, a common azo dye used in liquid crystal doping

== Examples ==
Azobenzenes, stilbenes, spiropyrans, are prominent classes of compounds subject to photoisomerism.

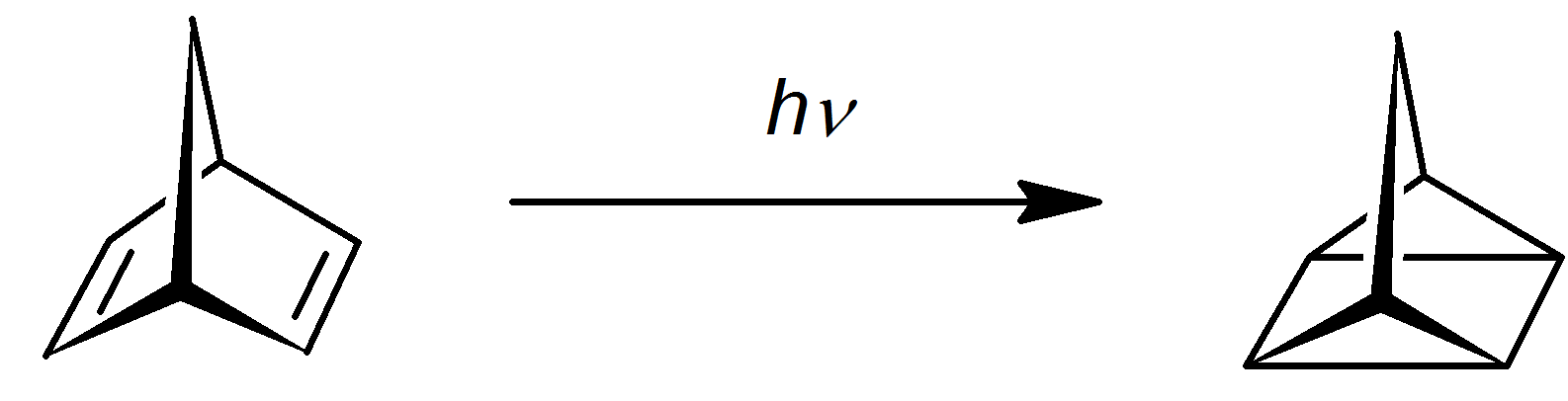
Photoisomerization of norbornadiene to quadricyclane.

In the presence of a catalyst, norbornadiene converts to quadricyclane via ~300nm UV radiation. When converted back to norbornadiene, quadryicyclane’s ring strain energy is liberated in the form of heat (ΔH = −89 kJ/mol). This reaction has been proposed to store solar energy (photoswitchs).

Photoisomerization behavior can be roughly categorized into several classes. Two major classes are trans–cis (or E–Z) conversion, and open-closed ring transition. Examples of the former include stilbene and azobenzene. This type of compounds has a double bond, and rotation or inversion around the double bond affords isomerization between the two states. Examples of the latter include fulgide and diarylethene. This type of compounds undergoes bond cleavage and bond creation upon irradiation with particular wavelengths of light. Still another class is the di-π-methane rearrangement.

== Coordination chemistry ==
Many complexes are often photosensitive and many of these complexes undergo photoisomerization. One case is the conversion of the colorless cis-bis(triphenylphosphine)platinum chloride to the yellow trans isomer.

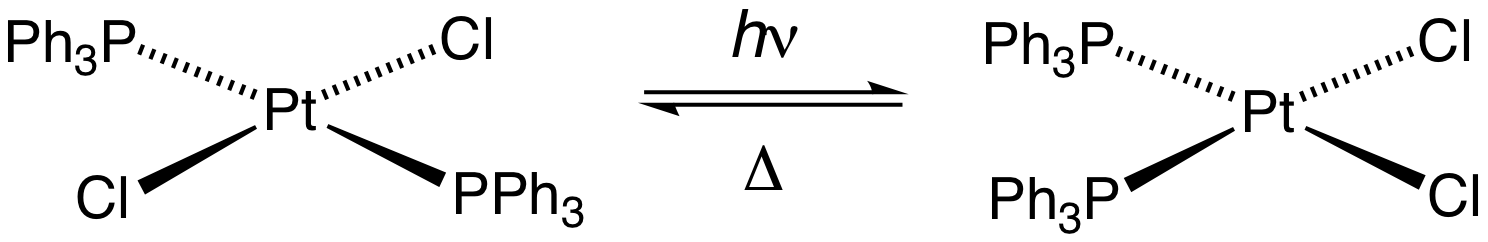
Photoisomerization of PtCl_{2}(PPh_{3})_{2}

Some coordination complexes undergo change in their spin state upon illumination, i.e. these are photosensitive spin crossover complexes.

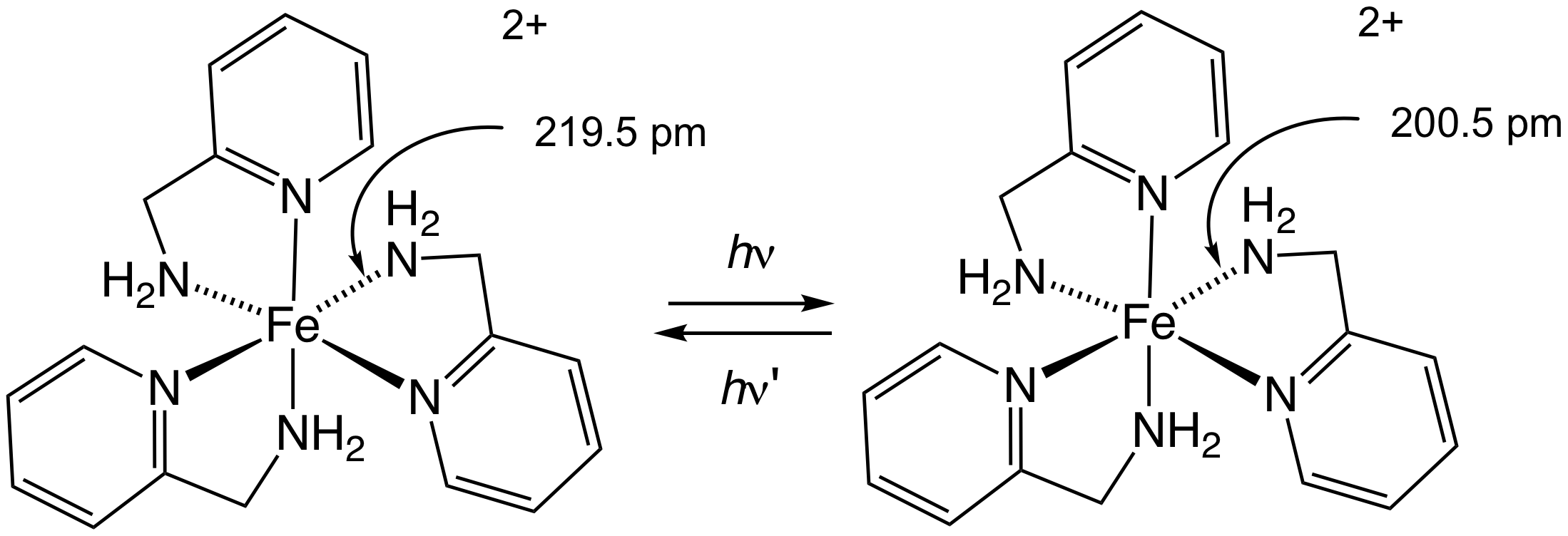
Light-induced spin-crossover of [Fe(pyCH_{2}NH_{2})_{3}]^{2+}, which switches from high and low-spin

== See also ==
- Photochromism
