= Synthetic membrane =

An artificial membrane, or synthetic membrane, is a synthetically created membrane which is usually intended for separation purposes in laboratory or in industry. Synthetic membranes have been successfully used for small and large-scale industrial processes since the middle of the twentieth century. A wide variety of synthetic membranes is known. They can be produced from organic materials such as polymers and liquids, as well as inorganic materials. Most commercially utilized synthetic membranes in industry are made of polymeric structures. They can be classified based on their surface chemistry, bulk structure, morphology, and production method. The chemical and physical properties of synthetic membranes and separated particles as well as separation driving force define a particular membrane separation process. The most commonly used driving forces of a membrane process in industry are pressure and concentration gradient. The respective membrane process is therefore known as filtration. Synthetic membranes utilized in a separation process can be of different geometry and flow configurations. They can also be categorized based on their application and separation regime. The best known synthetic membrane separation processes include water purification, reverse osmosis, dehydrogenation of natural gas, removal of cell particles by microfiltration and ultrafiltration, removal of microorganisms from dairy products, and dialysis.

== Membrane types and structure ==
Synthetic membrane can be fabricated from a large number of different materials. It can be made from organic or inorganic materials including solids such as metals, ceramics, homogeneous films, polymers, heterogeneous solids (polymeric mixtures, mixed glasses), and liquids. Ceramic membranes are produced from inorganic materials such as aluminium oxides, silicon carbide, and zirconium oxide. Ceramic membranes are very resistant to the action of aggressive media (acids, strong solvents). They are very stable chemically, thermally, and mechanically, and biologically inert. Even though ceramic membranes have a high weight and substantial production costs, they are ecologically friendly and have long working life. Ceramic membranes are generally made as monolithic shapes of tubular capillaries.

=== Liquid membranes ===
Liquid membranes refer to synthetic membranes made of non-rigid materials. Several types of liquid membranes can be encountered in industry: emulsion liquid membranes, immobilized (supported) liquid membranes, supported molten-salt membranes, and hollow-fiber contained liquid membranes. Liquid membranes have been extensively studied but thus far have limited commercial applications. Maintaining adequate long-term stability is a key problem, due to the tendency of membrane liquids to evaporate, dissolve in the phases in contact with them, or creep out of the membrane support.

=== Polymeric membranes ===
Polymeric membranes lead the membrane separation industry market because they are very competitive in performance and economics. Many polymers are available, but the choice of membrane polymer is not a trivial task. A polymer has to have appropriate characteristics for the intended application. The polymer sometimes has to offer a low binding affinity for separated molecules (as in the case of biotechnology applications), and has to withstand the harsh cleaning conditions. It has to be compatible with chosen membrane fabrication technology. The polymer has to be a suitable membrane former in terms of its chains rigidity, chain interactions, stereoregularity, and polarity of its functional groups. The polymers can range form amorphous and semicrystalline structures (can also have different glass transition temperatures), affecting the membrane performance characteristics. The polymer has to be obtainable and reasonably priced to comply with the low cost criteria of membrane separation process. Many membrane polymers are grafted, custom-modified, or produced as copolymers to improve their properties. The most common polymers in membrane synthesis are cellulose acetate, Nitrocellulose, and cellulose esters (CA, CN, and CE), polysulfone (PS), polyether sulfone(PES), polyacrilonitrile (PAN), polyamide, polyimide, polyethylene and polypropylene (PE and PP), polytetrafluoroethylene (PTFE), polyvinylidene fluoride (PVDF), polyvinylchloride (PVC).

Polysulfone (PS)

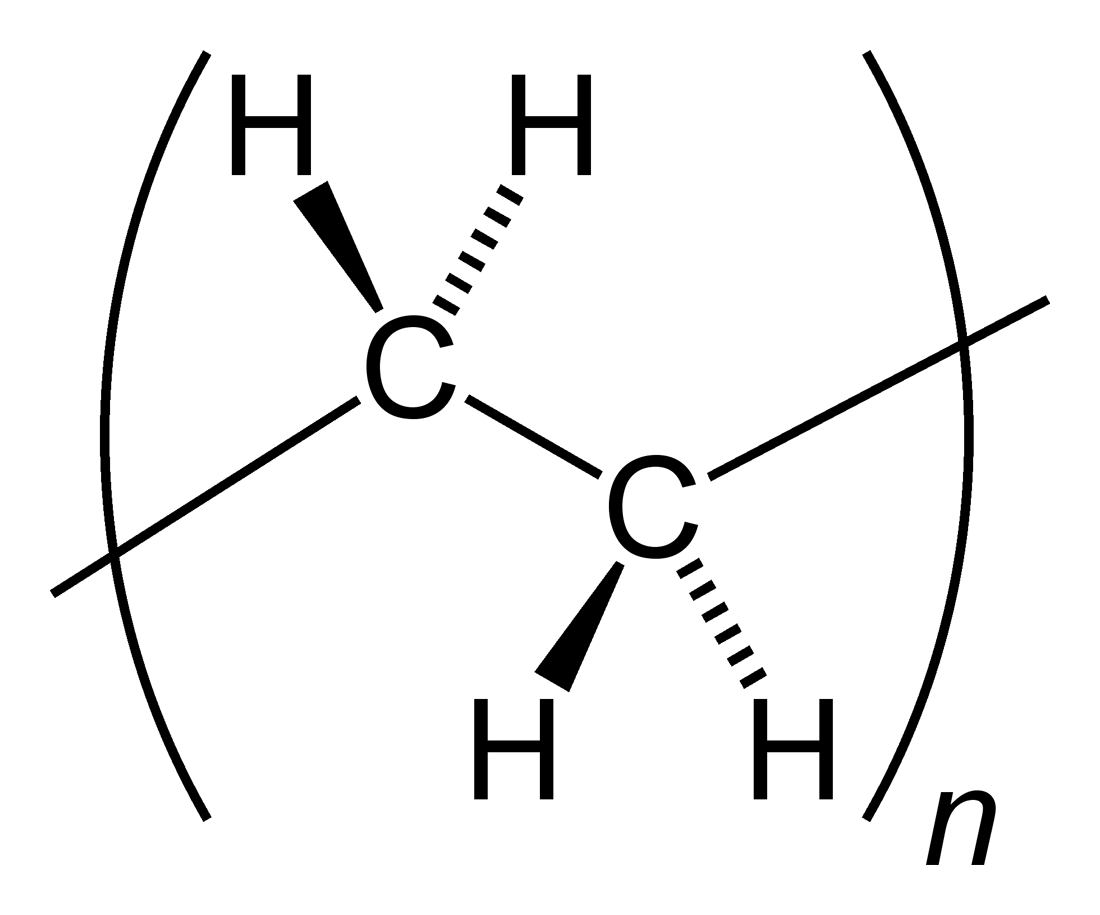
Polyethylene (PE)

Polytetrafluoroethylene (PTFE)

Polypropylene (PP)

=== Polymer electrolyte membranes ===
Polymer membranes may be functionalized into ion-exchange membranes by the addition of highly acidic or basic functional groups, e.g. sulfonic acid and quaternary ammonium, enabling the membrane to form water channels and selectively transport cations or anions, respectively. The most important functional materials in this category include proton-exchange membranes and alkaline anion-exchange membranes, that are at the heart of many technologies in water treatment, energy storage, energy generation. Applications within water treatment include reverse osmosis, electrodialysis, and reversed electrodialysis. Applications within energy storage include rechargeable metal-air electrochemical cells and various types of flow battery. Applications within energy generation include proton-exchange membrane fuel cells (PEMFCs), alkaline anion-exchange membrane fuel cells (AEMFCs), and both the osmotic- and electrodialysis-based osmotic power or blue energy generation.

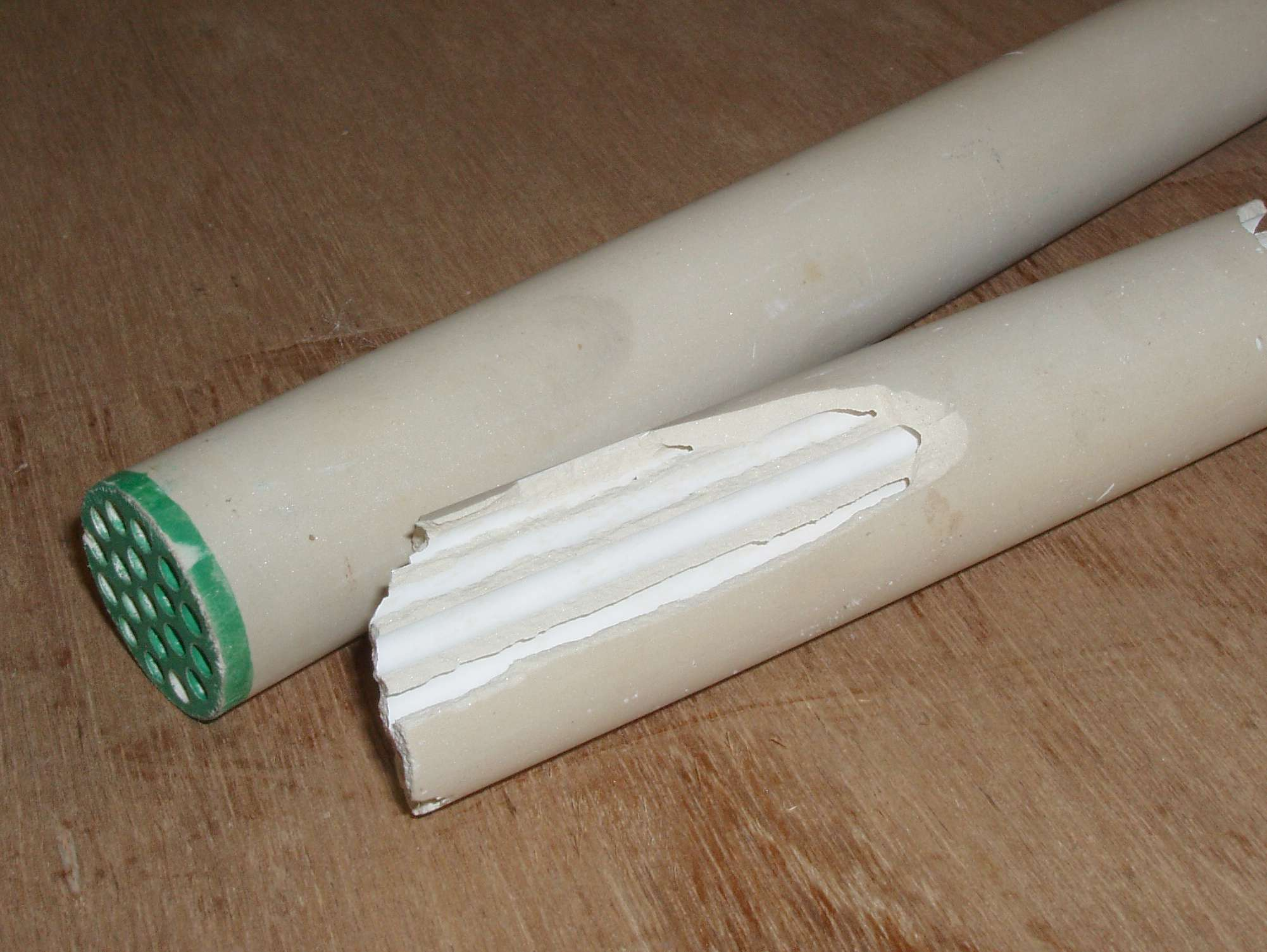
Ceramic multicanal elements

=== Ceramic membranes ===
Ceramic membranes are made from inorganic materials (such as alumina, titania, zirconia oxides, recrystallised silicon carbide or some glassy materials). By contrast with polymeric membranes, they can be used in separations where aggressive media (acids, strong solvents) are present. They also have excellent thermal stability which make them usable in high temperature membrane operations.

== Surface chemistry ==
Contact angle of a liquid droplet wetted to a rigid solid surface.Young's equation: γ_{LG} ∙cos θ+ γ_{SL}= γ_{SG}.

One of the critical characteristics of a synthetic membrane is its chemistry. Synthetic membrane chemistry usually refers to the chemical nature and composition of the surface in contact with a separation process stream. The chemical nature of a membrane's surface can be quite different from its bulk composition. This difference can result from material partitioning at some stage of the membrane's fabrication, or from an intended surface postformation modification. Membrane surface chemistry creates very important properties such as hydrophilicity or hydrophobicity (related to surface free energy), presence of ionic charge, membrane chemical or thermal resistance, binding affinity for particles in a solution, and biocompatibility (in case of bioseparations). Hydrophilicity and hydrophobicity of membrane surfaces can be expressed in terms of water (liquid) contact angle θ. Hydrophilic membrane surfaces have a contact angle in the range of 0°<θ<90° (closer to 0°), where hydrophobic materials have θ in the range of 90°<θ<180°.

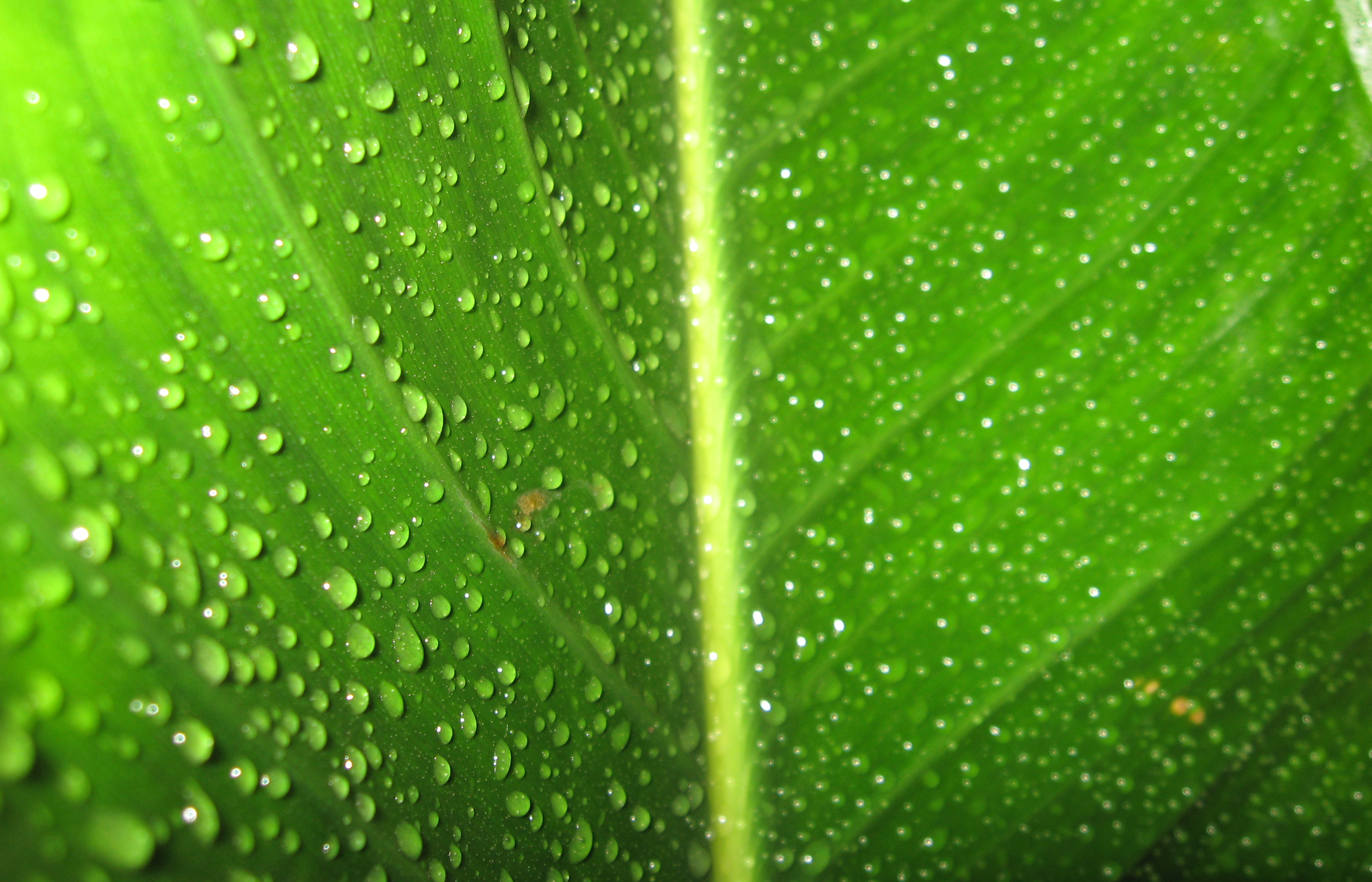
Wetting of a leaf.

The contact angle is determined by solving the Young's equation for the interfacial force balance. At equilibrium three interfacial tensions corresponding to solid/gas (γ_{SG}), solid/liquid (γ_{SL}), and liquid/gas (γ_{LG}) interfaces are counterbalanced. The consequence of the contact angle's magnitudes is known as wetting phenomena, which is important to characterize the capillary (pore) intrusion behavior. Degree of membrane surface wetting is determined by the contact angle. The surface with smaller contact angle has better wetting properties (θ=0°-perfect wetting). In some cases low surface tension liquids such as alcohols or surfactant solutions are used to enhance wetting of non-wetting membrane surfaces. The membrane surface free energy (and related hydrophilicity/hydrophobicity) influences membrane particle adsorption or fouling phenomena. In most membrane separation processes (especially bioseparations), higher surface hydrophilicity corresponds to the lower fouling. Synthetic membrane fouling impairs membrane performance. As a consequence, a wide variety of membrane cleaning techniques have been developed. Sometimes fouling is irreversible, and the membrane needs to be replaced. Another feature of membrane surface chemistry is surface charge. The presence of the charge changes the properties of the membrane-liquid interface. The membrane surface may develop an electrokinetic potential and induce the formation of layers of solution particles which tend to neutralize the charge.

== Membrane morphology ==
Synthetic membranes can be also categorized based on their structure (morphology). Three such types of synthetic membranes are commonly used in separation industry: dense membranes, porous membranes, and asymmetric membranes. Dense and porous membranes are distinct from each other based on the size of separated molecules. Dense membrane is usually a thin layer of dense material utilized in the separation processes of small molecules (usually in gas or liquid phase). Dense membranes are widely used in industry for gas separations and reverse osmosis applications.

Dense membranes can be synthesized as amorphous or heterogeneous structures. Polymeric dense membranes such as polytetrafluoroethylene and cellulose esters are usually fabricated by compression molding, solvent casting, and spraying of a polymer solution. The membrane structure of a dense membrane can be in a rubbery or a glassy state at a given temperature depending on its glass transition temperature . Porous membranes are intended on separation of larger molecules such as solid colloidal particles, large biomolecules (proteins, DNA, RNA) and cells from the filtering media. Porous membranes find use in the microfiltration, ultrafiltration, and dialysis applications. There is some controversy in defining a "membrane pore". The most commonly used theory assumes a cylindrical pore for simplicity. This model assumes that pores have the shape of parallel, nonintersecting cylindrical capillaries. But in reality a typical pore is a random network of the unevenly shaped structures of different sizes. The formation of a pore can be induced by the dissolution of a "better" solvent into a "poorer" solvent in a polymer solution. Other types of pore structure can be produced by stretching of crystalline structure polymers. The structure of porous membrane is related to the characteristics of the interacting polymer and solvent, components concentration, molecular weight, temperature, and storing time in solution. The thicker porous membranes sometimes provide support for the thin dense membrane layers, forming the asymmetric membrane structures. The latter are usually produced by a lamination of dense and porous membranes.

== See also ==
- Membrane technology
