= C14H12 =

The molecular formula C_{14}H_{12} (molar mass : 180.25 g/mol) may refer to:

- 9,10-Dihydroanthracene
- Stilbenes
  - (E)-Stilbene
  - (Z)-Stilbene
- 1,1-Diphenylethylene
- Octalene
- Heptafulvalene
