= Diphenylethylene =

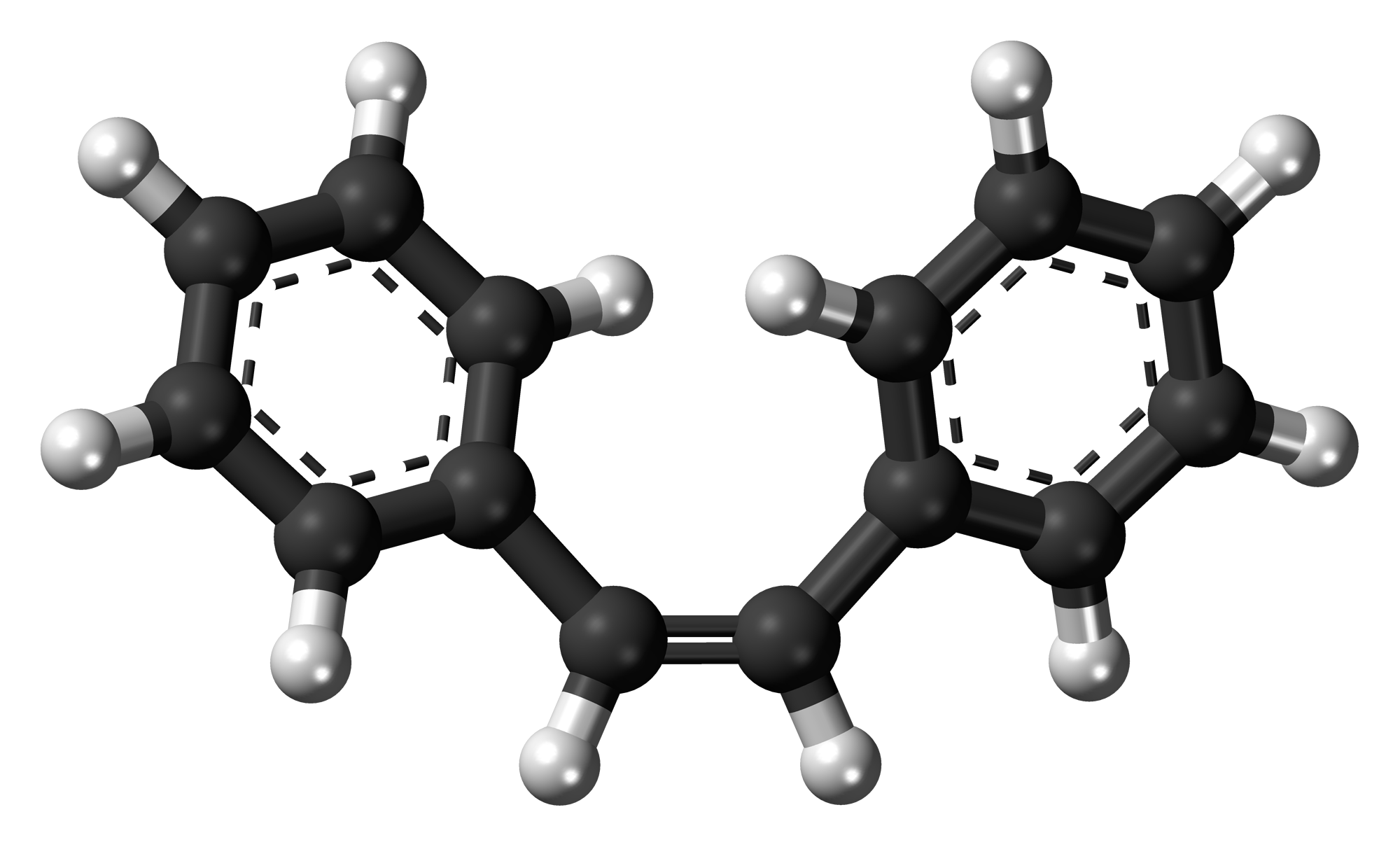
Model of (Z)-stilbene molecule

Diphenylethylene or Diphenylethene may refer to:

- 1,1-Diphenylethylene
- 1,2-Diphenylethylene, or Stilbene
  - (E)-Stilbene (trans-isomer)
  - (Z)-Stilbene (cis-isomer)

== See also ==
- Stilbenoids
