= Fluoren-9-ol dehydrogenase =

Chemical compound

fluoren-9-ol dehydrogenase

Identifiers
- EC no.: 1.1.1.256
- CAS no.: 154215-16-4

Databases
- BRENDA: enzyme data
- ExPASy: NiceZyme view
- KEGG: enzyme entry
- MetaCyc: metabolic pathway
- Rhea: reactions
- PDB structures: RCSB PDB PDBe PDBsum
- Gene Ontology: AmiGO / QuickGO
Search
- PMC: articles
- PubMed: articles
- NCBI: proteins

In enzymology, fluoren-9-ol dehydrogenase (EC 1.1.1.256) is an enzyme that catalyzes the chemical reaction

fluorenol
+ NAD^{+}
H^{+}
H^{+}
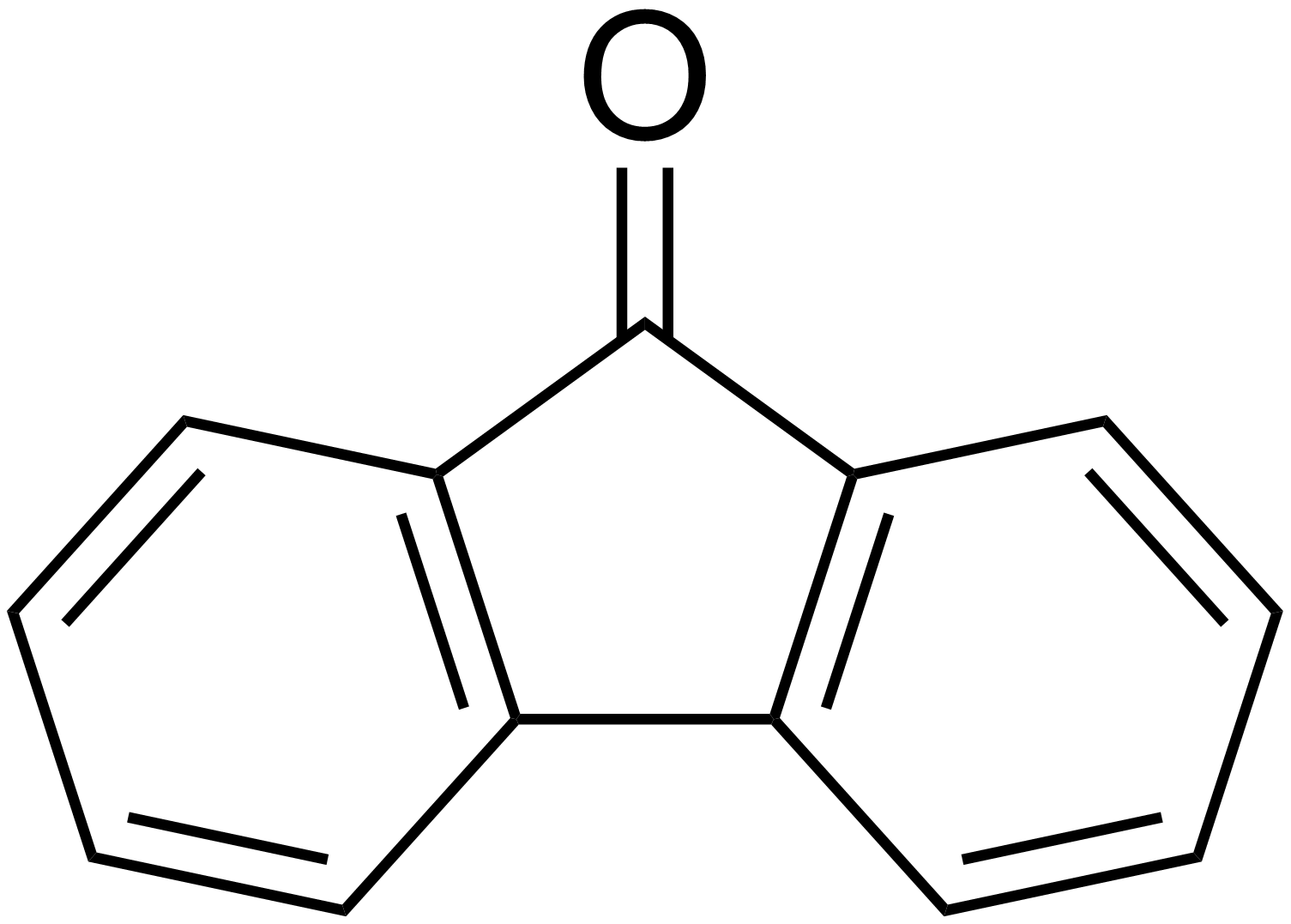
fluorenone
+ NADH

The two substrates of this enzyme are fluorenol and oxidised nicotinamide adenine dinucleotide (NAD^{+}). Its products are fluorenone, reduced NADH, and a proton. The enzyme can also use the alternative cofactor, nicotinamide adenine dinucleotide phosphate.

This enzyme belongs to the family of oxidoreductases, specifically those acting on the CH-OH group of donor with NAD^{+} or NADP^{+} as acceptor. The systematic name of this enzyme class is fluoren-9-ol:NAD(P)^{+} oxidoreductase. This enzyme participates in fluorene degradation.
