= C14H10 =

The molecular formula C_{14}H_{10} (molar mass: 178.23 g/mol) may refer to:

- Anthracene
- Diphenylacetylene
- Phenanthrene
- 9-Methylene-fluorene, or dibenzofulvene (DBF)
