= Dihydrocoumarin hydrolase =

Class of enzymes

Identifiers
- EC no.: 3.1.1.35
- CAS no.: 37278-47-0

Databases
- BRENDA: enzyme data
- ExPASy: NiceZyme view
- KEGG: enzyme entry
- MetaCyc: metabolic pathway
- Rhea: reactions
- PDB structures: RCSB PDB PDBe PDBsum
- Gene Ontology: AmiGO / QuickGO
Search
- PMC: articles
- PubMed: articles
- NCBI: proteins

Dihydrocoumarin hydrolase (EC 3.1.1.35) is an enzyme that catalyzes the reaction

2-chromanone
H_{2}O
melilotic acid

The enzyme characterised from Melilotus alba hydrolyses 2-chromanone to melilotic acid. The enzyme is part of a pathway that degrades the aromatic hydrocarbon, fluorene.

This enzyme is a hydrolase, specifically one acting on carboxylic ester bonds. The systematic name is dihydrocoumarin lactonohydrolase.
