= Diphenic acid =

Dicarboxylic acid of biphenyl

Names
- Preferred IUPAC name [1,1′-Biphenyl]-2,2′-dicarboxylic acid
- Other names 2,2'-dibenzoic acid

Identifiers
CAS Number	482-05-3
3D model (JSmol)	Interactive image
ChEBI	CHEBI:23837
ChEMBL	ChEMBL79411
ChemSpider	9795
ECHA InfoCard	100.006.889
EC Number	207-576-4
Gmelin Reference	536420
PubChem CID	10210
UNII	QY5X735ZIM
CompTox Dashboard (EPA)	DTXSID0060064
- InChI: InChI=1S/C14H10O4/c15-13(16)11-7-3-1-5-9(11)10-6-2-4-8-12(10)14(17)18/h1-8H,(H,15,16)(H,17,18) Key: GWZCCUDJHOGOSO-UHFFFAOYSA-N
- SMILES: C1=CC=C(C(=C1)C2=CC=CC=C2C(=O)O)C(=O)O

Properties
Chemical formula	C_{14}H_{10}O_{4}
Molar mass	242.230 g·mol^{−1}
Appearance	white solid
Density	1.2917 g/cm^{3}
Melting point	235.5 °C (455.9 °F; 508.6 K)

Hazards
- GHS labelling
Pictograms	(GHS07: Exclamation mark)
Signal word	Warning
Hazard statements	H315, H319, H335
Precautionary statements	P261, P264, P271, P280, P302+P352, P304+P340, P305+P351+P338, P312, P321, P332+P313, P337+P313, P362, P403+P233, P405, P501
- Except where otherwise noted, data are given for materials in their standard state (at 25 °C [77 °F], 100 kPa). Infobox references

Diphenic acid, also known as Dibenzoic acid, is an organic compound with the formula (C_{6}H_{4}CO_{2}H)_{2}. It is the most studied of several isomeric dicarboxylic acids of biphenyl. It is a white solid that can be prepared in the laboratory from anthranilic acid via the diazonium salt. It is the product of the microbial action on phenanthrene.

The compound forms a variety of coordination polymers. It also exhibits atropisomerism. It can form an internal anhydride featuring a seven-membered ring fused to the two benzene rings.

== Preparation ==
Diphenic acid is prepared from anthranilic acid by diazotization, followed by reduction with copper(I).

It can also be synthesized from the oxidation of phenanthrene by peracetic acid, which is first prepared from acetic acid and 90% hydrogen peroxide:

CH_{3}COOH + H_{2}O_{2} ⇌ CH_{3}COOOH + H_{2}O

4 CH_{3}COOOH + C_{14}H_{10} → 4 CH_{3}COOH + C_{14}H_{10}O_{4}

Phenanthrene can also be treated with other oxidizing agents (such as hydrogen peroxide, chromium trioxide, potassium dichromate, or potassium permanganate), which first yields phenanthrenequinone and gives diphenic acid on further oxidation. Similarly, phenanthrenequinone can be boiled in alcoholic potash (potassium hydroxide in alcohol) to give the potassium salt of diphenic acid, and can alternatively be photo-oxidized to diphenic acid.
