= Α-Phenylcinnamic acid =

α-Phenycinnamic acid
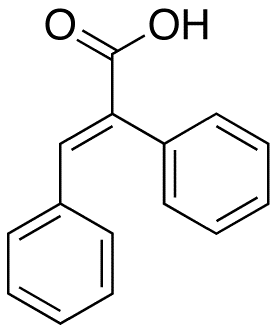

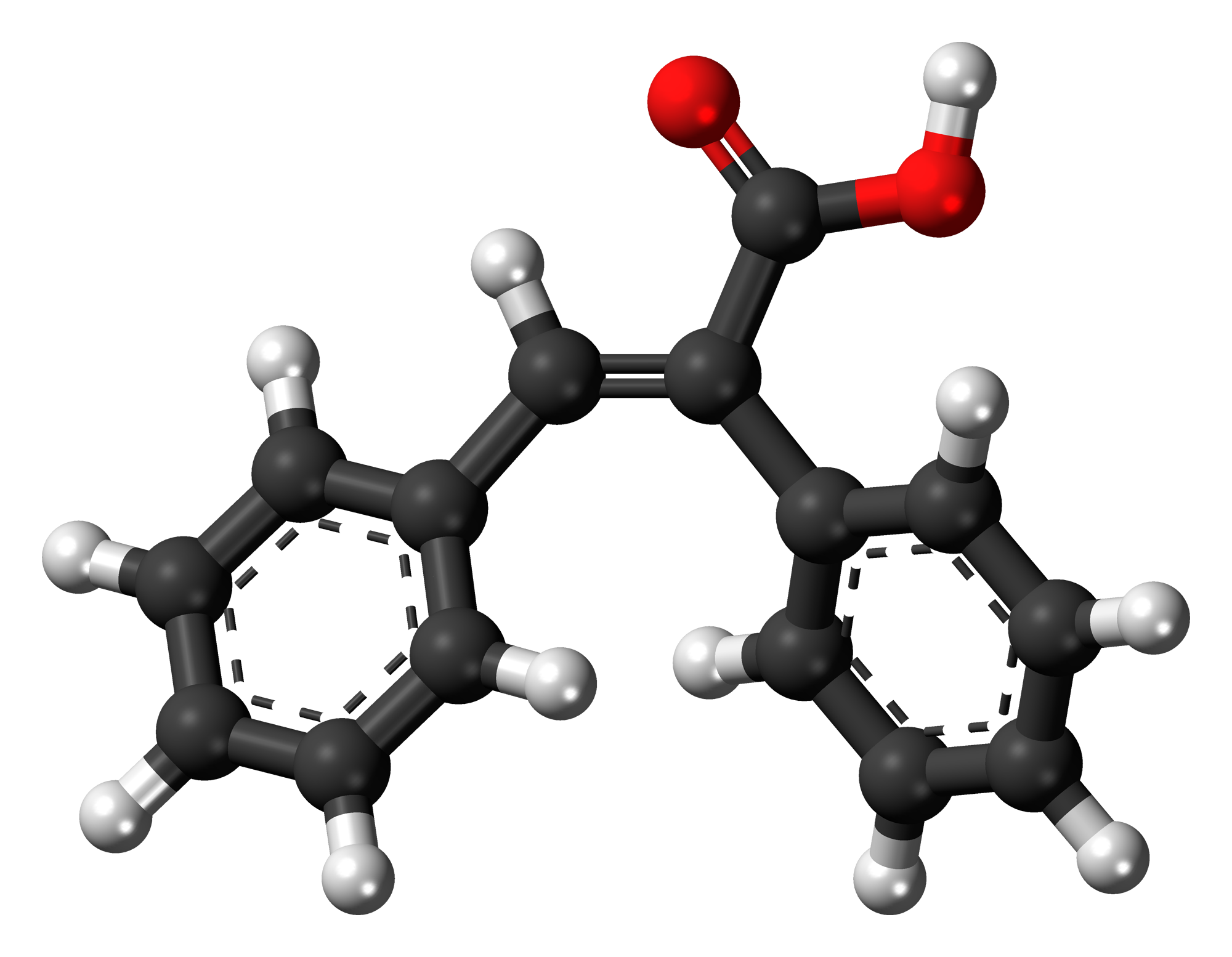

Names
- Preferred IUPAC name (2E)-2,3-Diphenylprop-2-enoic acid
- Other names α-Phenylcinnamic acid, α-(Phenylmethylene)benzeneacetic acid, α-Phenyl-trans-cinnamic acid

Identifiers
CAS Number	91-48-5
3D model (JSmol)	Interactive image; Interactive image
ChemSpider	610577
ECHA InfoCard	100.001.882
EC Number	202-069-4
PubChem CID	700620
UNII	0PKH62904B
CompTox Dashboard (EPA)	DTXSID00871015
- InChI: InChI=1S/C15H12O2/c16-15(17)14(13-9-5-2-6-10-13)11-12-7-3-1-4-8-12/h1-11H,(H,16,17)/b14-11+ Key: BIDDLDNGQCUOJQ-SDNWHVSQSA-N; InChI=1/C15H12O2/c16-15(17)14(13-9-5-2-6-10-13)11-12-7-3-1-4-8-12/h1-11H,(H,16,17)/b14-11+ Key: BIDDLDNGQCUOJQ-SDNWHVSQBV
- SMILES: OC(=O)C(=C/C1=CC=CC=C1)/C2=CC=CC=C2; O=C(O)\C(=C\c1ccccc1)c2ccccc2

Properties
Chemical formula	C_{15}H_{12}O_{2}
Molar mass	224.259 g·mol^{−1}
Appearance	White to light yellow powder
Melting point	172 to 174 °C (342 to 345 °F; 445 to 447 K)
Boiling point	224 to 225 °C (435 to 437 °F; 497 to 498 K)
Solubility in water	Slightly soluble

Hazards
- Occupational safety and health (OHS/OSH)
Main hazards	Irritant
- GHS labelling
Pictograms	(GHS07: Exclamation mark)
Signal word	Warning
Hazard statements	H315, H319, H335
Precautionary statements	P261, P264, P271, P280, P302+P352, P304+P340, P305+P351+P338, P312, P321, P332+P313, P337+P313, P362, P403+P233, P405, P501
- Except where otherwise noted, data are given for materials in their standard state (at 25 °C [77 °F], 100 kPa). verify (what is ?) Infobox references

α-Phenylcinnamic acid is a phenylpropanoid, or, more specifically, a derivative of cinnamic acid. It has the formula C_{15}H_{12}O_{2} and appears as an off-white crystalline solid.

== Uses ==
α-Phenylcinnamic acid is frequently used as a compound synthesized in undergraduate laboratories to study the Perkin reaction, but is primarily seen as in intermediate or precursor to other, more useful phenylpropanoids.

== Synthesis ==
There are many ways to synthesize α-phenylcinnamic acid. Some of the more popular methods of formation include the condensation of phenacyl chloride with benzaldehyde in the presence of triethylamine, the distillation of benzylmandelic acid, or by the reaction of sodium phenylacetate with benzaldehyde in acetic anhydride. There are two isomers of this compound, differing in the geometry of the alkene. The E isomer, in which the two phenyl rings are cis to each other, is the major product formed by most synthetic routes. However, this compound can be converted using heat or ultraviolet light into a mixture containing nearly 50% of the Z isomer. Decarboxylation of α-phenylcinnamic acid yields stilbene, with the (E) isomer producing cis-stilbene and the (Z)-isomer producing trans-stilbene.
