= C14H8O2 =

The molecular formula C_{14}H_{8}O_{2} (molar mass: 208.216 g/mol) may refer to:

- Anthraquinone, also known as anthracenedione or dioxoanthracene
- Phenanthrenequinone
