= Disodium 4,4'-dinitrostilbene-2,2'-disulfonate =

Names
- Preferred IUPAC name Disodium 2,2′-[(E)-ethene-1,2-diyl]bis(5-nitrobenzene-1-sulfonate)

Identifiers
CAS Number	3709-43-1
3D model (JSmol)	Interactive image
ChemSpider	4651070
ECHA InfoCard	100.020.956
PubChem CID	5713304
UNII	4U494VHI4D
CompTox Dashboard (EPA)	DTXSID7027542
- InChI: InChI=1S/C14H10N2O10S2.2Na/c17-15(18)11-5-3-9(13(7-11)27(21,22)23)1-2-10-4-6-12(16(19)20)8-14(10)28(24,25)26;;/h1-8H,(H,21,22,23)(H,24,25,26);;/q;2*+1/p-2/b2-1+;; Key: SDCDTWFAOKXZHD-SEPHDYHBSA-L
- SMILES: c1cc(c(cc1[N+](=O)[O-])S(=O)(=O)[O-])/C=C/c2ccc(cc2S(=O)(=O)[O-])[N+](=O)[O-].[Na+].[Na+]

Properties
Chemical formula	C_{14}H_{8}N_{2}O_{10}S_{2}
Molar mass	428.34 g·mol^{−1}
- Except where otherwise noted, data are given for materials in their standard state (at 25 °C [77 °F], 100 kPa). Infobox references

Disodium 4,4′-dinitrostilbene-2,2′-disulfonate is an organic compound with the formula (O_{2}NC_{6}H_{3}(SO_{3}Na)CH)_{2}. This salt is a common precursor to a variety of textile dyes and optical brighteners.

== Preparation and reactions ==
The synthesis of disodium 4,4′-dinitrostilbene-2,2′-disulfonate begins with sulfonation of 4-nitrotoluene. This reaction affords 4-nitrotoluene-2-sulfonic acid. Oxidation of this species with sodium hypochlorite yields the disodium salt of 4,4′-dinitrostilbene-2,2′-disulfonic acid. The product is useful as its reaction with aniline derivatives results in the formation of azo dyes. Commercially important dyes derived from this compound include Direct Red 76, Direct Brown 78, and Direct Orange 40. Reduction gives 4,4′-diamino-2,2′-stilbenedisulfonic acid, which is a common optical brightener.

Structure of Direct Yellow 12, an azo dye produced from disodium 4,4′-dinitrostilbene-2,2′-disulfonate.

== History ==
Arthur Green and André Wahl first reported the formation of disodium 4,4'-dinitrostilbene-2,2'-disulfonate using sodium hypochlorite.
