= Fluorenone =

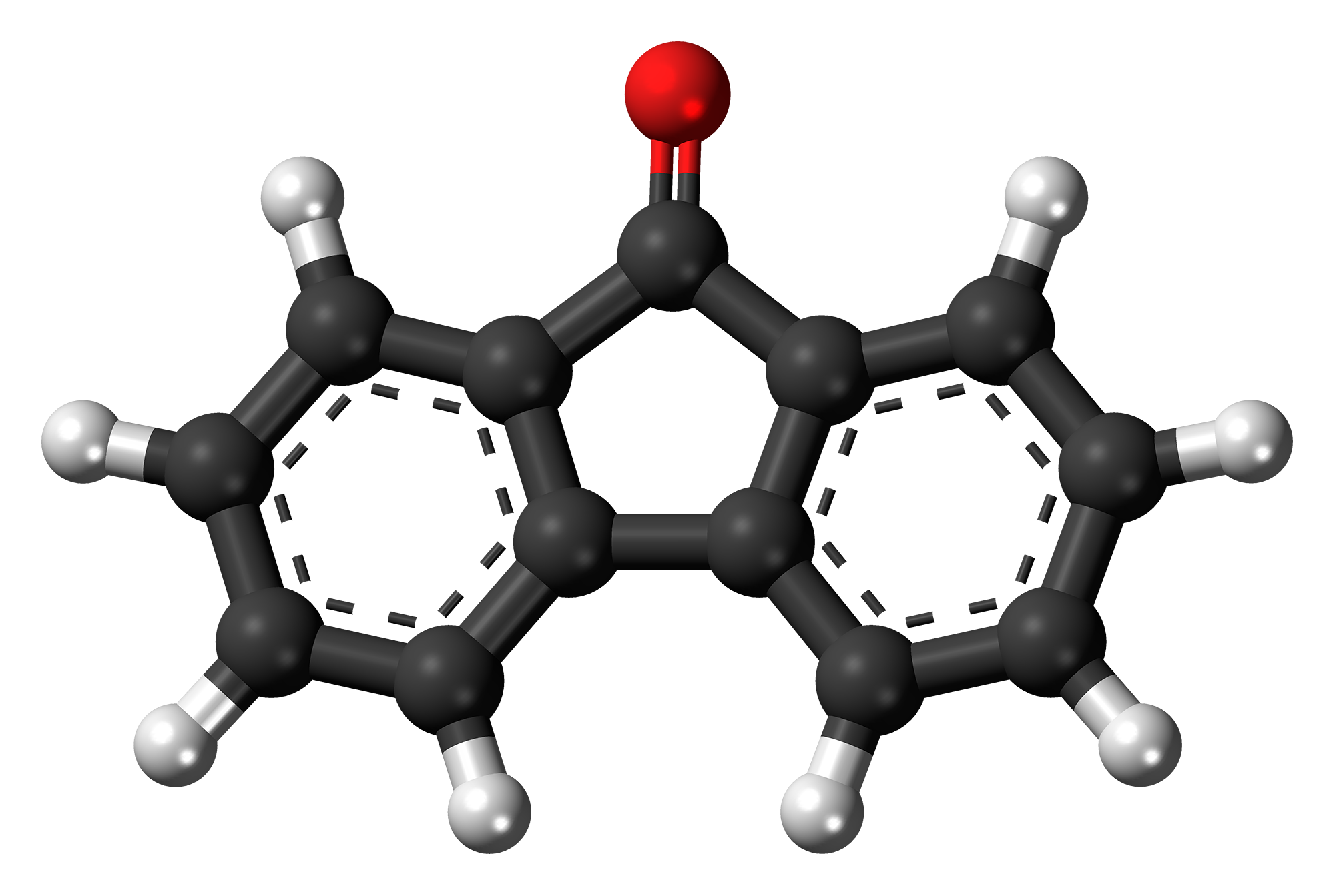

Names
- Preferred IUPAC name 9H-Fluoren-9-one
- Other names 9-Fluorenone; 9-Oxofluorene; Diphenylene ketone

Identifiers
CAS Number	486-25-9
3D model (JSmol)	Interactive image
ChEBI	CHEBI:17922
ChEMBL	ChEMBL571655
ChemSpider	9824
ECHA InfoCard	100.006.937
KEGG	C06712
PubChem CID	10241
UNII	AZ9T83S2AQ
CompTox Dashboard (EPA)	DTXSID6049307
- InChI: InChI=1S/C13H8O/c14-13-11-7-3-1-5-9(11)10-6-2-4-8-12(10)13/h1-8H Key: YLQWCDOCJODRMT-UHFFFAOYSA-N; InChI=1/C13H8O/c14-13-11-7-3-1-5-9(11)10-6-2-4-8-12(10)13/h1-8H Key: YLQWCDOCJODRMT-UHFFFAOYAR
- SMILES: c1ccc2c(c1)-c3ccccc3C2=O

Properties
Chemical formula	C_{13}H_{8}O
Molar mass	180.206 g·mol^{−1}
Appearance	Yellow solid
Density	1.130 g/cm^{3} (99 °C)
Melting point	84.0 °C (183.2 °F; 357.1 K)
Boiling point	341.5 °C (646.7 °F; 614.6 K)
Solubility in water	Insoluble
Solubility	soluble in alcohol, acetone, benzene very soluble in ether, toluene
log P	3.58
Magnetic susceptibility (χ)	−99.4·10^{−6} cm^{3}/mol
Refractive index (n_{D})	1.6309

Hazards
- Occupational safety and health (OHS/OSH)
Main hazards	Irritant
NFPA 704 (fire diamond)	1 1 0
Flash point	163 °C (325 °F; 436 K)
Autoignition temperature	608 °C (1,126 °F; 881 K)
Safety data sheet (SDS)	External MSDS

Related compounds
Related compounds	Fluorene; 1,8-Diazafluoren-9-one
- Except where otherwise noted, data are given for materials in their standard state (at 25 °C [77 °F], 100 kPa). verify (what is ?) Infobox references

Fluorenone is an organic compound with the chemical formula (C_{6}H_{4})_{2}CO, and is a ketone with a fluorene moiety. It is a bright yellow, fluorescent solid.

== Synthesis and reactions ==
It is synthesised by aerobic oxidation of fluorene:

(C_{6}H_{4})_{2}CH_{2} + O_{2} → (C_{6}H_{4})_{2}CO + H_{2}O

Fluorenone sustains up to four nitro groups giving 2,4,5,7-tetranitrofluorenone.

== Applications ==
Several substituted fluorenones are biologically active as antibiotic, anticancer, antiviral, or neuromodulatory compounds.

Some substituted azafluorenones are biologically active, such as the naturally occurring antimicrobial compound onychine (1-methyl-4-azafluorenone). The compound 1,8-diazafluoren-9-one is used for fingerprint detection.

=== Drugs ===
Fluorenone is used to synthesize:

- A drug called IPS-339 [60979-28-4].
- An analog of 2-MDP.
- Paranyline (aka Renytoline, Mer 27).
- Via a Beckmann rearrangement, phenanthridone [1015-89-0]. This compound is used in the synthesis of fantridone.
- An analog of amitriptyline, as reported by Roche: [4684-13-3].
- CYM50769

== See also ==
- Fluorenol
- Chlorflurenol
