= Meso-Stilbene dibromide =

Organic molecule

meso-Stilbene dibromide

Names
- Preferred IUPAC name 1,1′-[(1R,2S)-1,2-Dibromoethane-1,2-diyl]dibenzene
- Other names Stilbene dibromide; meso-1,2-dibromo-1,2-diphenyl ethane

Identifiers
CAS Number	13440-24-9
3D model (JSmol)	Interactive image
ChEMBL	ChEMBL3115205
ChemSpider	2279317
ECHA InfoCard	100.162.977
PubChem CID	2753450
- InChI: InChI=1S/C14H12Br2/c15-13(11-7-3-1-4-8-11)14(16)12-9-5-2-6-10-12/h1-10,13-14H/t13-,14+ Key: GKESIQQTGWVOLH-OKILXGFUSA-N
- SMILES: C1=CC=C(C=C1)[C@H]([C@H](C2=CC=CC=C2)Br)Br

Properties
Chemical formula	C_{14}H_{12}Br_{2}
Molar mass	340.058 g·mol^{−1}
Appearance	White solid
Melting point	241 °C (466 °F; 514 K)
Dipole moment	0.4-0.9

Hazards
- GHS labelling
Pictograms	(GHS05: Corrosive) (GHS07: Exclamation mark)
Signal word	Danger
Hazard statements	H302, H314
Precautionary statements	P260, P264, P270, P280, P301+P312, P301+P330+P331, P302+P352, P303+P361+P353, P304+P340, P305+P351+P338, P310, P321, P330, P332+P313, P337+P313, P362, P363, P405, P501
- Except where otherwise noted, data are given for materials in their standard state (at 25 °C [77 °F], 100 kPa). Infobox references

meso-Stilbene dibromide is an organic compound with a formula of (C_{6}H_{5}CH(Br))_{2}. It is one of three isomeric stilbene dibromides, the others being the pair of enantiomers. All are white solids.

== Synthesis and reactions ==
meso-Stilbene dibromide can be prepared by treatment of (E)-stilbene with bromine.

Reaction of stilbene dibromide with base gives diphenylacetylene.
