= 4,4′-Diamino-2,2′-stilbenedisulfonic acid =

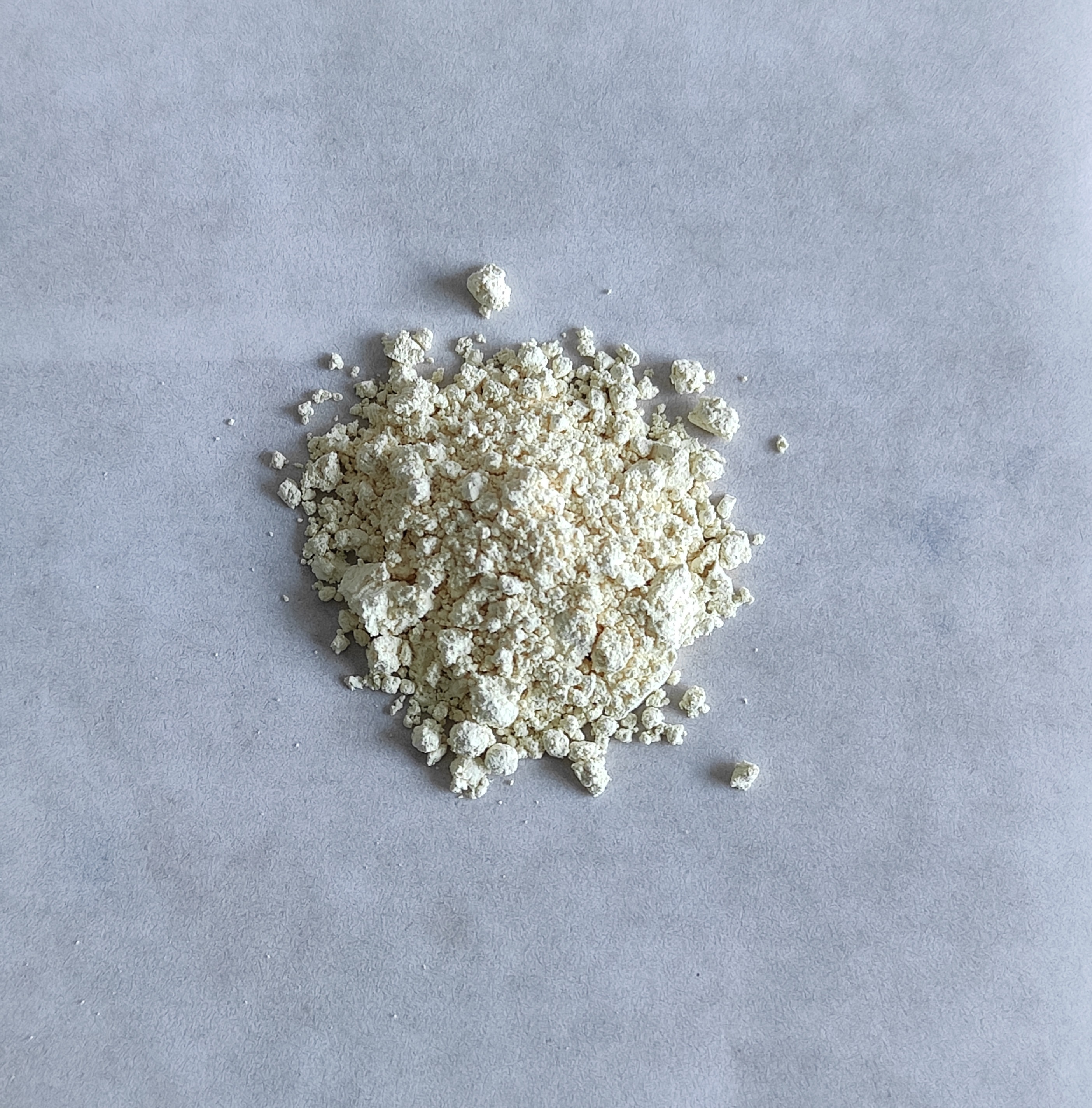

Names
- Preferred IUPAC name 2,2′-[(E)-Ethene-1,2-diyl]bis(5-aminobenzene-1-sulfonic acid)
- Other names amsonic acid

Identifiers
CAS Number	81-11-8
3D model (JSmol)	Interactive image
ChemSpider	4447454
ECHA InfoCard	100.001.206
PubChem CID	11462834
UNII	899GJ5MP05
CompTox Dashboard (EPA)	DTXSID5024926
- InChI: InChI=1S/C14H14N2O6S2/c15-11-5-3-9(13(7-11)23(17,18)19)1-2-10-4-6-12(16)8-14(10)24(20,21)22/h1-8H,15-16H2,(H,17,18,19)(H,20,21,22)/b2-1+ Key: REJHVSOVQBJEBF-OWOJBTEDSA-N
- SMILES: c1cc(c(cc1N)S(=O)(=O)O)/C=C/c2ccc(cc2S(=O)(=O)O)N

Properties
Chemical formula	C_{14}H_{14}N_{2}O_{6}S_{2}
Molar mass	370.39 g·mol^{−1}
Appearance	White solid
- Except where otherwise noted, data are given for materials in their standard state (at 25 °C [77 °F], 100 kPa). Infobox references

4,4′-Diamino-2,2′-stilbenedisulfonic acid is the organic compound with the formula (H_{2}NC_{6}H_{3}SO_{3}H)_{2}C_{2}H_{2}. It is a white, water-soluble solid. Structurally, it is a derivative of trans-stilbene, containing amino and sulfonic acid functional groups on each of the two phenyl rings.

The compound is a popular optical brightener for use in laundry detergents.

It is produced by reduction of 4,4′-dinitro-2,2′-stilbenedisulfonic acid with iron powder.
