= Diarylethene =

Diarylethene is the general name of a class of chemical compounds that have aromatic functional groups bonded to each end of a carbon–carbon double bond. The simplest example is stilbene, which has two geometric isomers, E and Z.

Under the influence of light, these compounds can generally perform two kinds of reversible isomerizations:

- E to Z isomerizations, most common for stilbenes (and azobenzenes). This process goes through an excited state energy minimum where the aromatic rings lie at 90° to each other. This conformation drops to the ground state and generally relaxes to trans and cis forms in a 1:1 ratio, thus the quantum yield for E-Z isomerization is very rarely greater than 0.5.
- 6π electrocyclizations of the Z form, leading to an additional bond between the two aryl functionalities and a disruption of the aromatic character of these groups. The quantum yield of this reaction is generally less than 0.1, and in most diarylethenes the close-ring form is thermally unstable, reverting to the cis-form in a matter of seconds or minutes under ambient conditions.

Thermal isomerization is also possible. In E-Z isomerization, the thermal equilibrium lies well towards the trans-form because of its lower energy (~15 kJ mol^{−1} in stilbene). The activation energy for thermal E-Z isomerization is 150–190 kJ mol^{−1} for stilbene, meaning that temperatures above 200°C are required to isomerize stilbene at a reasonable rate, but most derivatives have lower energy barriers (e.g. 65 kJ mol^{−1} for 4-aminostilbene). The activation energy of the electrocyclization is 73 kJ mol^{−1} for stilbene.

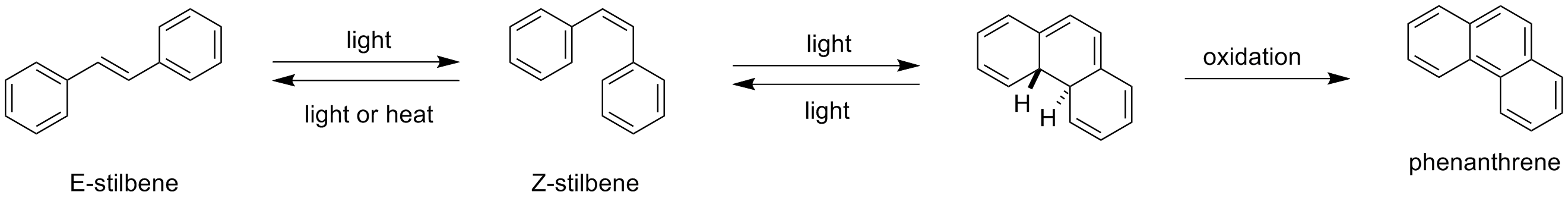
Stilbene isomerizations under the influence of light

Both processes are often applied in molecular switches and for photochromism (reversible state changes from exposure to light).

After the 6π electrocyclization of the Z form to the "close-ring" form, most unsubstituted diarylethenes are prone to oxidation, leading to a re-aromatization of the π-system. The most common example is (E)-stilbene, which upon irradiation undergoes an E to Z isomerization, which can be followed by a 6π electrocyclization. Reaction of the product of this reaction with molecular oxygen affords phenanthrene, and it has been suggested by some studies that dehydrogenation may even occur spontaneously. The dihydrophenanthrene intermediate has never been isolated, but it has been detected spectroscopically in pump-probe experiments by virtue of its long wavelength optical absorption band. Although both the E-Z isomerization and the 6π electrocyclization are reversible processes, this oxidation renders the entire sequence irreversible.

== Stabilization of the closed-ring form to oxidation ==
One solution to the problem of oxidation is to replace the hydrogens ortho to the carbon-carbon double bond by groups that can not be removed during the oxidation. Following the Woodward–Hoffmann rules, the photochemical 6π cyclization takes place in a conrotatory fashion, leading to products with an anti configuration of the methyl substituents. As both methyl groups are attached to a stereogenic center, two enantiomers (R,R and S,S) are formed, normally as a racemic mixture. This approach also has the advantage that the thermal (disrotatory) ring closure can not take place because of steric hindrance between the substitution groups.

== Dithienylethenes ==
Dithienylethene molecular switch.

Ortho-substitution of the aromatic units results in a stabilization against oxidation, but the closed-ring form still has a low thermodynamic stability in most cases (e.g. 2,3-dimesityl-2-butene has a half-life of 90 seconds at 20°C). This problem can be addressed by lowering the aromaticity of the system. The most commonly used example are the dithienylethenes, i.e. alkenes with a thiophene ring on either side.

Dithienylethene derivatives have shown different types of photochemical side reactions, e.g., oxidation or elimination reactions of the ring-closed isomer and formation of an annulated ring isomer as a byproduct of the photochromic reaction. In order to overcome the first, the 2-position of the thiophenes is substituted with a methyl group, preventing oxidation of the ring closed form. Also often the two free α-positions on the double bond are connected in a 5 or 6-membered ring in order to lock the double bond into the cis-form. This makes the dithienylethene undergo only open-closed ring isomerization, unconfused by E-Z isomerization. More recently, based on recent findings showing that by-product formation most likely occurs exclusively from the lowest singlet excited state, a superior fatigue resistance of dithienylethenes upon visible-light excitation has been achieved by attaching small triplet-sensitizing moieties to the diarylethene core via a π-conjugated linkage.

The dithienylethenes are also of interest for the fact that their isomerization requires very little change of shape. This means that their isomerization in a solid matrix can take place much more quickly than with most other photochromic molecules. In the case of some analogs, photochromic behavior can even be carried out in single crystals without disrupting the crystal structure.

== Applications ==
Typically, the open-ring isomers are colorless compounds, whereas the closed-ring isomers have colors dependent on their chemical structure, due to the extended conjugation along the molecular backbone. Therefore, many diarylethenes have photochromic behavior both in solution and in solid state. Moreover, these two isomers differ from one another not only in their absorption spectra but also in various physical and chemical properties, such as their refractive index, dielectric constant, and oxidation-reduction potential. These properties can be readily controlled by reversible isomerization between the open- and closed-ring states using photoirradiation, and thus they have been suggested for use in optical data storage and 3D optical data storage in particular. The closed form has a conjugated path from one end of the molecule to the other, whereas the open form has not. This allows for the electronic communication between functional groups attached to the far ends of the diarylethene to be switched on and off using UV and visible light.
