= 9-Methylene-fluorene =

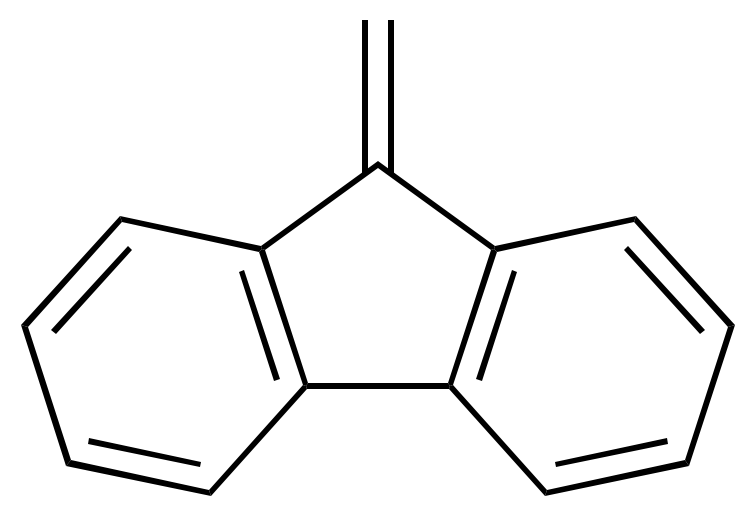

Names
- Preferred IUPAC name 9-Methylidene-9H-fluorene
- Other names Methylenefluorene; 9-Methylidenefluorene; Dibenzofulvene

Identifiers
CAS Number	4425-82-5
3D model (JSmol)	Interactive image
ChemSpider	70523
ECHA InfoCard	100.251.583
PubChem CID	78147
UNII	9299E1P3CC
CompTox Dashboard (EPA)	DTXSID90196082
- InChI: InChI=1S/C14H10/c1-10-11-6-2-4-8-13(11)14-9-5-3-7-12(10)14/h2-9H,1H2 Key: ZYASLTYCYTYKFC-UHFFFAOYSA-N
- SMILES: C=C1C2=CC=CC=C2C3=CC=CC=C13

Properties
Chemical formula	C_{14}H_{10}
Molar mass	178.234 g·mol^{−1}
- Except where otherwise noted, data are given for materials in their standard state (at 25 °C [77 °F], 100 kPa). Infobox references

9-Methylene-fluorene or dibenzofulvene (DBF) is a polycyclic aromatic hydrocarbon with chemical formula (C_{6}H_{4})_{2}C=CH_{2}. It is best known as one product from deprotection of the Fmoc group. It can be prepared by treatment of 9-hydroxymethylfluorene with strong base.

== Properties ==
It is an analog of a 1,1-diphenylethylene. Polymerization of 9-methylene-fluorene produces a π-stacked polymer.

== See also ==
- Fluorene
- Fluorenylmethyloxycarbonyl chloride
- Fluorenylidene
