= Fluorenylidene =

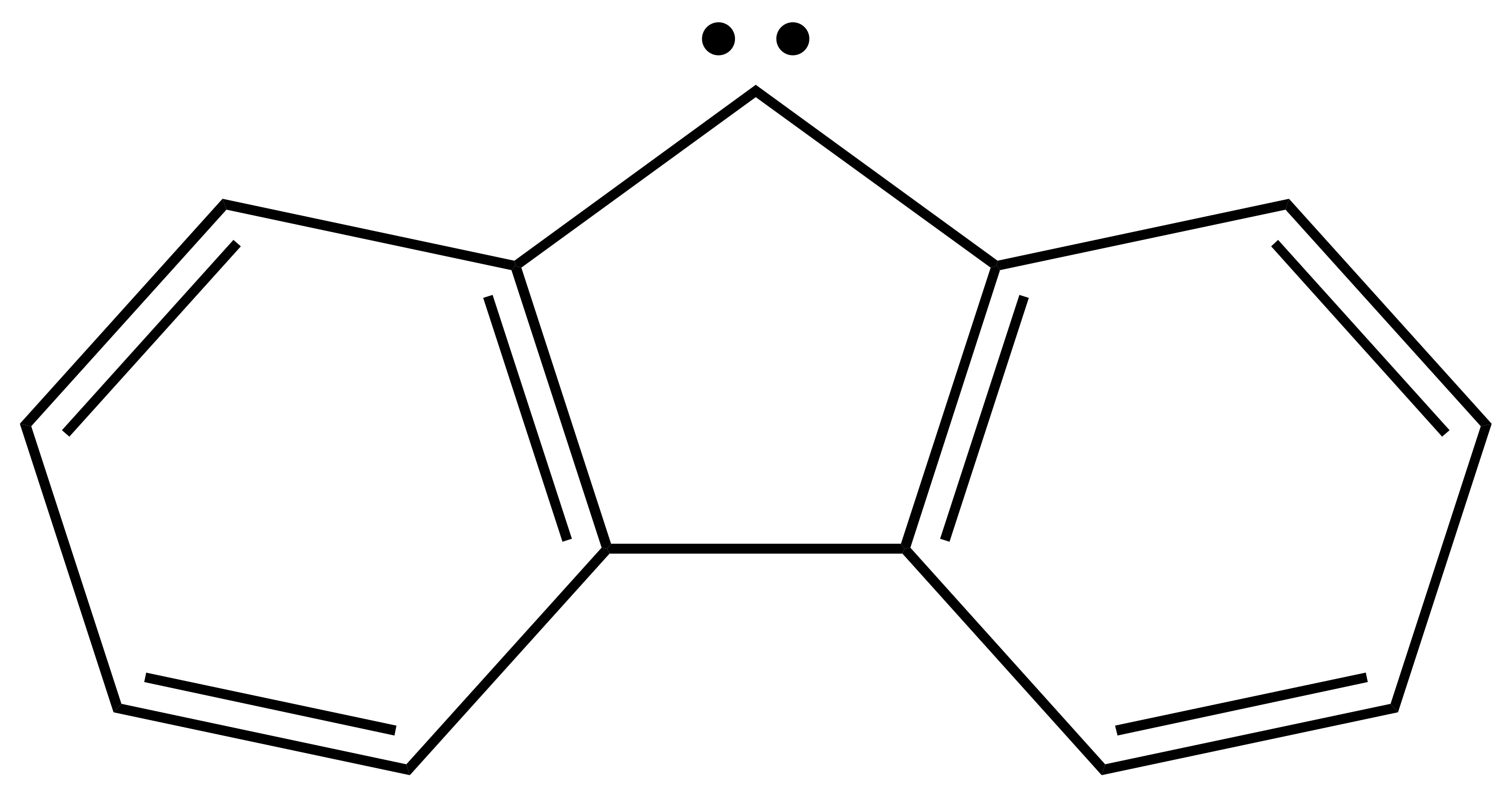

Names
- Preferred IUPAC name 9H-Fluoren-9-ylidene

Identifiers
CAS Number	2762-16-5
3D model (JSmol)	Interactive image
ChemSpider	10617870
PubChem CID	58713856
CompTox Dashboard (EPA)	DTXSID001045356
- InChI: InChI=1S/C13H8/c1-3-7-12-10(5-1)9-11-6-2-4-8-13(11)12/h1-8H Key: LJJQENSFXLXPIV-UHFFFAOYSA-N; InChI=1/C13H8/c1-3-7-12-10(5-1)9-11-6-2-4-8-13(11)12/h1-8H Key: LJJQENSFXLXPIV-UHFFFAOYAV
- SMILES: c1ccc-2c(c1)[C]c3c2cccc3

Properties
Chemical formula	C_{13}H_{8}
Molar mass	164.207 g·mol^{−1}
- Except where otherwise noted, data are given for materials in their standard state (at 25 °C [77 °F], 100 kPa). Infobox references

9-Fluorenylidene is an aryl carbene derived from the bridging methylene group of fluorene. Fluorenylidene has the unusual property that the triplet ground state is only 1.1 kcal/mol (4.6 kJ/mol) lower in energy than the singlet state. For this reason, fluorenylidene has been studied extensively in organic chemistry.

Fluorenylidene is a reactive intermediate. Reactions involving fluorenylidene proceed through either the triplet or singlet state carbene, and the products formed depend on the relative concentration of spin states in solution, as influenced by experimental conditions. The rate of intersystem crossing is determined by the temperature and concentration of specific spin-trapping agents.

== Structure ==
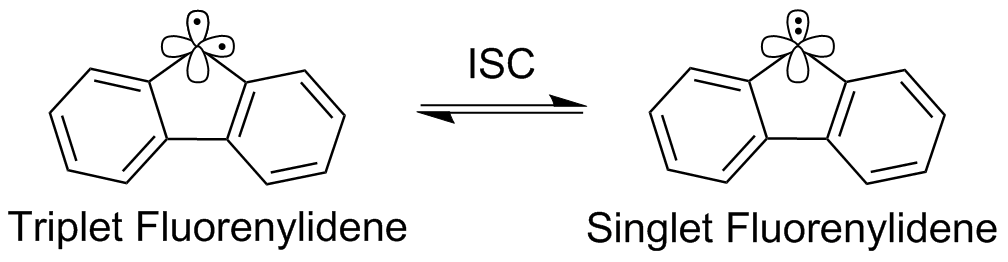
Intersystem crossing and associated spin-state orbitals of Fluorenylidene.

The ground state is believed to be a bent triplet, with two orthogonal sp hybrid orbitals singly occupied by unpaired spins. One electron occupies an orbital of sigma symmetry in the plane of the rings, while the other occupies an orbital of pi symmetry, which interacts with the pi systems of the adjacent aromatic rings (delocalization into the rings is minimal, since zero-field parameter D is high). The zero field splitting parameters predict a bond angle greater than 135°, and since the ideal bond geometry for cyclopentane carbons is about 109°, considerable ring strain causes the methylene sigma bonds to be bent. In the singlet state, the spin-paired electrons occupy the sp^{2} hybrid orbital, orthogonal to an empty p-orbital. Conversion of singlet to triplet fluorenylidene is achieved through intersystem crossing (ISC).

== Generation of fluorenylidene ==
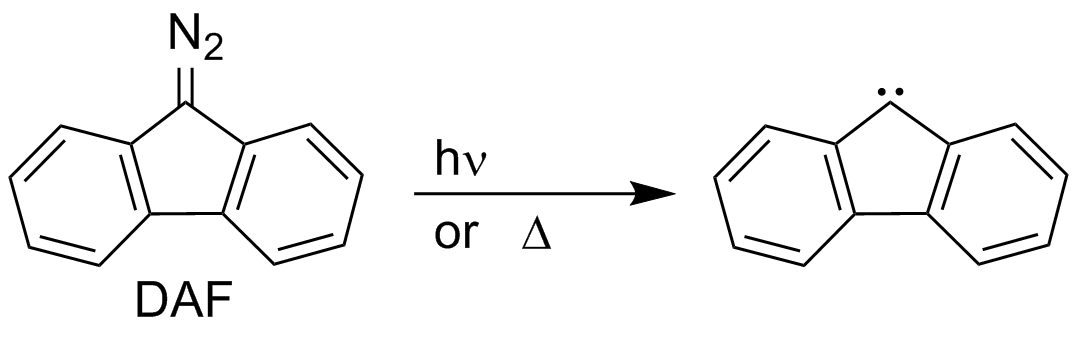
Synthesis of fluorenylidene from thermolysis or photolysis of 9-diazofluorene (DAF)

Fluorenylidene can be produced by photolysis of 9-diazofluorene (DAF).

Ultra-fast (300 fs) time resolved laser-flash photolysis of DAF implicates a four-step process in the formation of fluorenylidene by irradiation of 9-diazofluorene.

1. Irradiation of DAF initially yields an excited singlet state diazofluorene molecule ( ^{1}DAF*)
2. ^{1}DAF* decays to form the open shell carbene,^{1}FL*, as the minor product, and the less energetic closed shell carbene, ^{1}FL, as the major product.
3. Any excited singlet ^{1}FL* in solution relaxes to the lower energy singlet state ^{1}FL (20.9 ps)
4. ^{1}FL equilibrates with the ground state triplet ^{3}FL by intersystem crossing.

== Reaction of fluorenylidene in solution ==
Fluorenylidene reacts with olefins as predicted by the Skell-Woodworth rules. The stereochemistry of cycloaddition products depends on the relative rates of cyclopropanation (or other reactions) and intersystem crossing. Stabilization of specific spin states, and, by extension, increased stereospecificity can be achieved by using solvents of different polarities .

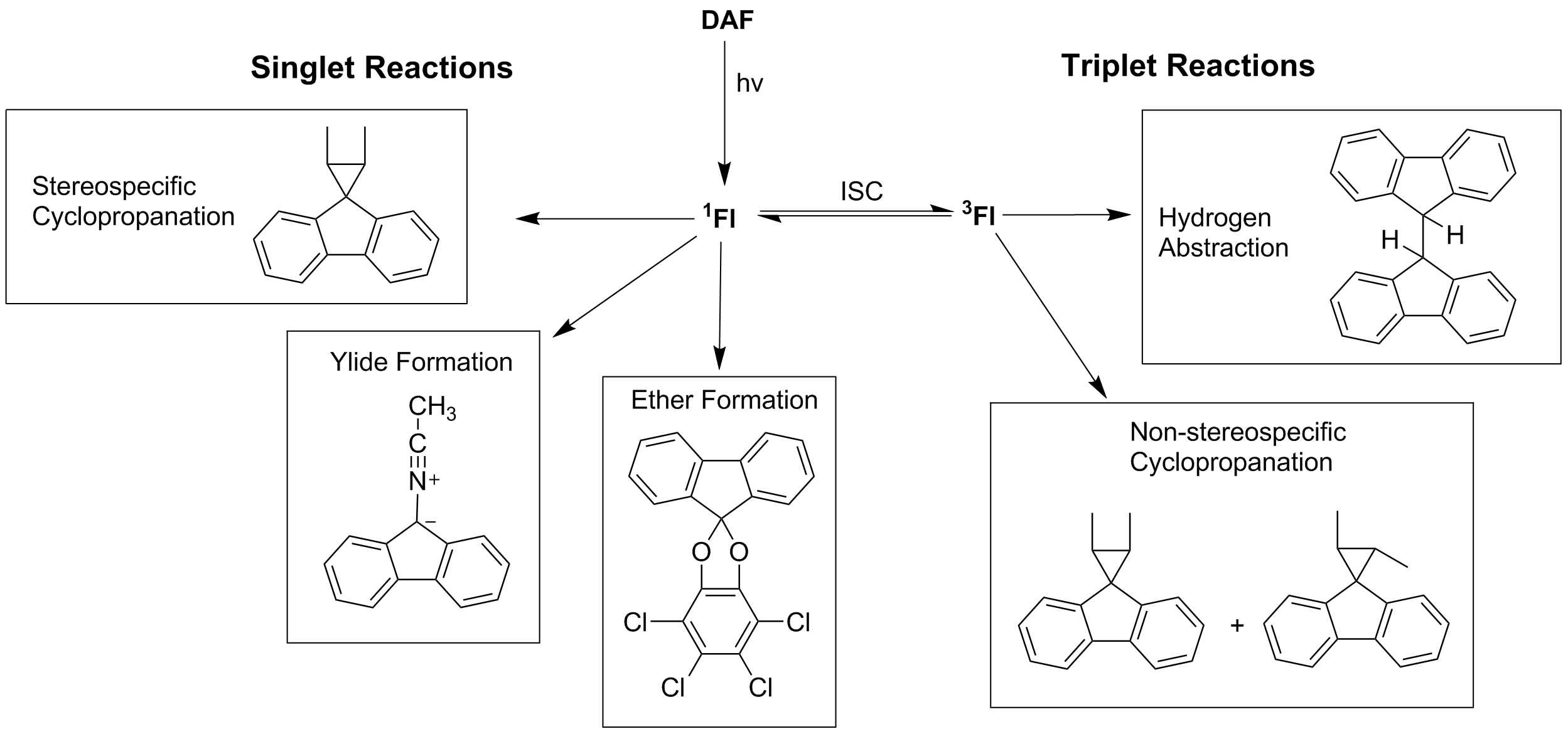
Examples of various reaction routes of fluorenylidene in solution

== Triplet fluorenylidene reactivity ==
Triplet fluorenylidene reacts with olefins in a stepwise fashion to produce a racemic mixture, provided that the rate of spin inversion (intersystem crossing) is not significantly faster than rates of intermediate bond rotation.

== Singlet fluorenylidene reactivity ==
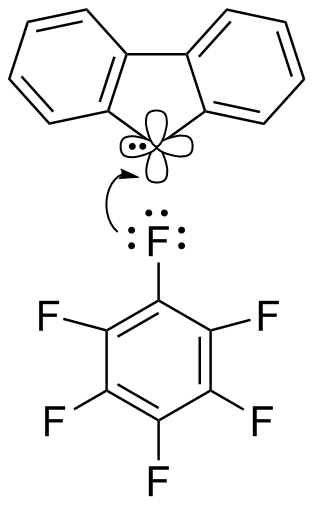
Donation of lone pair electrons into the vacant p-orbital of singlet fluorenylidene.

Singlet fluorenylidene reacts with olefins in a concerted fashion, maintaining the stereochemistry of the reactant olefin. Triplet quenchers such as butadiene solvents can be used to increase stereospecific yields. Halogenated solvents also stabilize the singlet state. For example, dibromomethane and hexafluorobenzene deactivate the higher-energy singlet state, decelerating the rate of intersystem crossing in accordance with earlier studies of diphenylcarbene. The mechanism of singlet state deactivation is theorized to occur through halogen-lone pair complexation of empty 1Fl P-orbitals.

== See also ==
- 9-Methylene-fluorene
