= CataCXium F sulf =

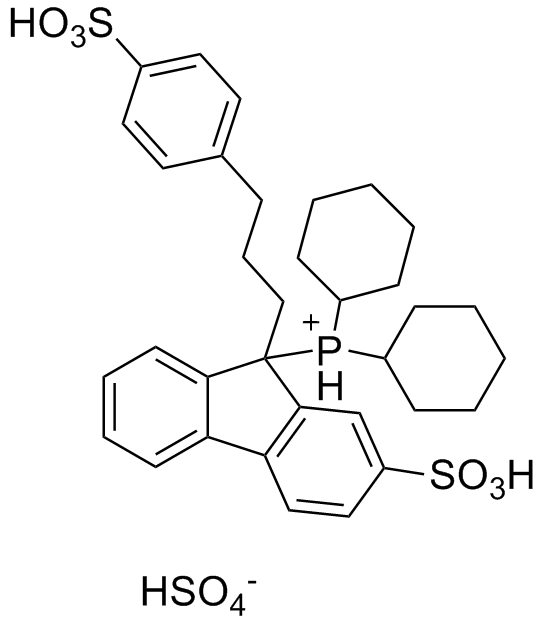

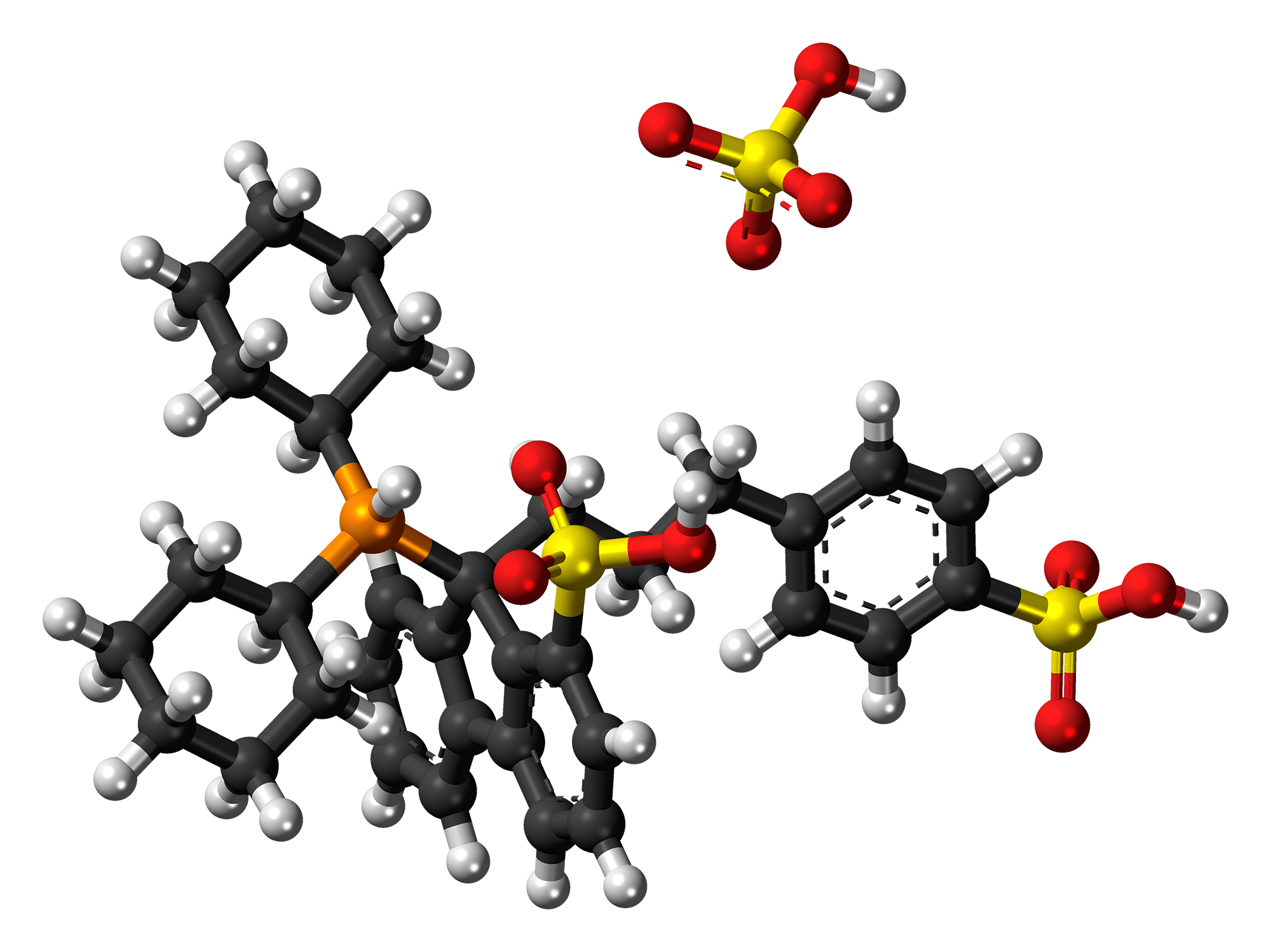

Names
- IUPAC name (±)-Dicyclohexyl-{9-[3-(4-sulfonylphenyl)propyl]-2-sulfonylfluoren-9-yl}phosphonium hydrogensulfate
- Other names CataCXium F sulf

Identifiers
CAS Number	1039775-34-2
3D model (JSmol)	Interactive image
ChemSpider	28475201
ECHA InfoCard	100.221.684
PubChem CID	24878816
CompTox Dashboard (EPA)	DTXSID30647780
- InChI: InChI=1S/C34H41O6PS2.H2O4S/c35-42(36,37)28-19-17-25(18-20-28)10-9-23-34(41(26-11-3-1-4-12-26)27-13-5-2-6-14-27)32-16-8-7-15-30(32)31-22-21-29(24-33(31)34)43(38,39)40;1-5(2,3)4/h7-8,15-22,24,26-27H,1-6,9-14,23H2,(H,35,36,37)(H,38,39,40);(H2,1,2,3,4) Key: HNJNDGZFLWQSEG-UHFFFAOYSA-N
- SMILES: c1ccc2c(c1)-c3ccc(cc3C2(CCCc4ccc(cc4)S(=O)(=O)O)[PH+](C5CCCCC5)C6CCCCC6)S(=O)(=O)O.OS(=O)(=O)[O-]

Properties
Chemical formula	C_{34}H_{43}O_{10}PS_{3}
Molar mass	738.87 g/mol
Appearance	pale yellow solid
Solubility	soluble in water

Hazards
- GHS labelling
Pictograms	(GHS07: Exclamation mark)
Signal word	Warning
Hazard statements	H315, H319, H335
Precautionary statements	P261, P264, P271, P280, P302+P352, P304+P340, P305+P351+P338, P312, P321, P332+P313, P337+P313, P362, P403+P233, P405, P501
- Except where otherwise noted, data are given for materials in their standard state (at 25 °C [77 °F], 100 kPa). verify (what is ?) Infobox references

CataCXium F sulf is a water-soluble organophosphorus compound derived from fluorene. The palladium complexes of the respective phosphine show an excellent activity in various palladium-catalyzed coupling reactions, including Suzuki reactions, Sonogashira couplings and Buchwald–Hartwig reactions.
