= (E)-Stilbene =

- trans-stilbene - skeletal formula

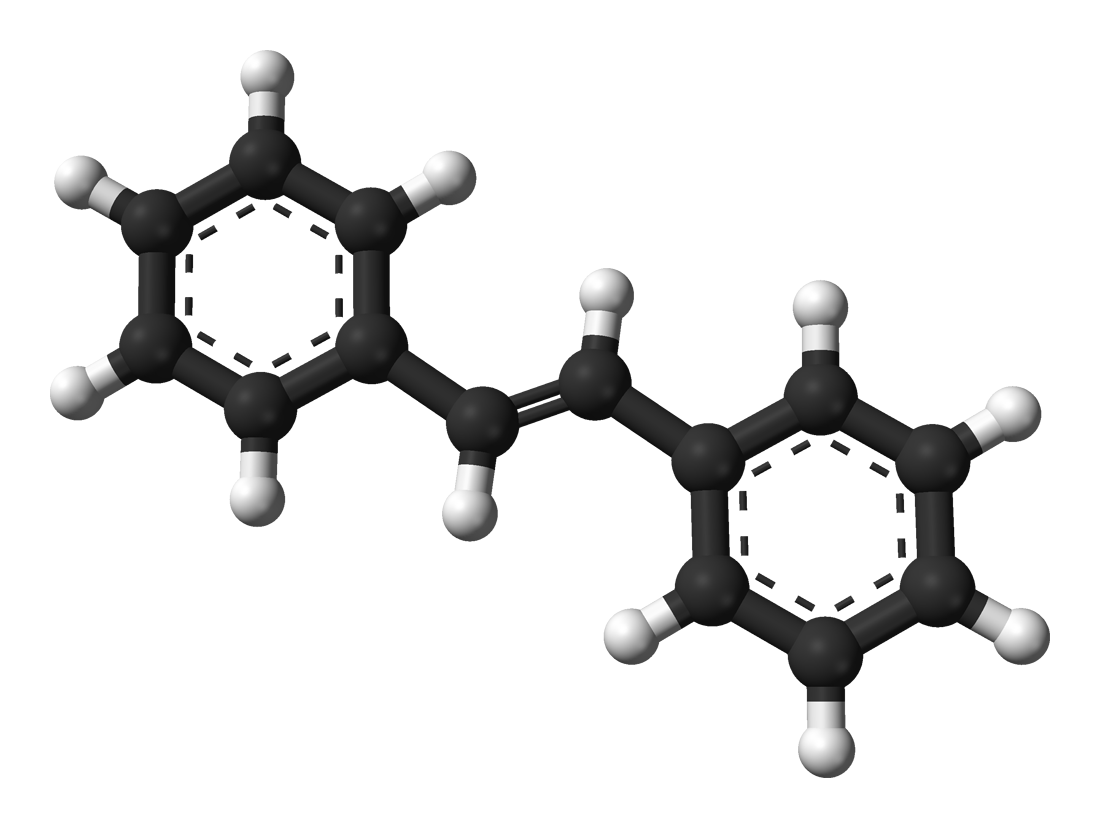
- trans-stilbene - ball-and-stick model

Names
- IUPAC name (E)-Stilbene
- Preferred IUPAC name 1,1′-[(E)-Ethene-1,2-diyl]dibenzene
- Other names Bibenzylidene trans-α,β-Diphenylethylene (E)-1,2-Diphenylethylene ((1E)-2-Phenylvinyl)benzene trans-Stilbene [(E)-2-Phenylethenyl]benzene

Identifiers
CAS Number	103-30-0
3D model (JSmol)	Interactive image; Interactive image
Beilstein Reference	1616740
ChEBI	CHEBI:36007
ChEMBL	ChEMBL113028
ChemSpider	553649
ECHA InfoCard	100.002.817
EC Number	203-098-5
Gmelin Reference	4381
PubChem CID	638088
UNII	3FA7NW80A0
UN number	3077
CompTox Dashboard (EPA)	DTXSID4026050
- InChI: InChI=1S/C14H12/c1-3-7-13(8-4-1)11-12-14-9-5-2-6-10-14/h1-12H/b12-11+ Key: PJANXHGTPQOBST-VAWYXSNFSA-N; InChI=1/C14H12/c1-3-7-13(8-4-1)11-12-14-9-5-2-6-10-14/h1-12H/b12-11+ Key: PJANXHGTPQOBST-VAWYXSNFBV
- SMILES: c2(\C=C\c1ccccc1)ccccc2; c1ccc(cc1)/C=C/c2ccccc2

Properties
Chemical formula	C_{14}H_{12}
Molar mass	180.250 g·mol^{−1}
Appearance	Solid
Density	0.9707 g/cm^{3}
Melting point	122 to 125 °C (252 to 257 °F; 395 to 398 K)
Boiling point	305 to 307 °C (581 to 585 °F; 578 to 580 K)
Solubility in water	Practically insoluble

Hazards
NFPA 704 (fire diamond)	1 1 0
Flash point	> 112 °C (234 °F; 385 K)
Safety data sheet (SDS)	External MSDS
- Except where otherwise noted, data are given for materials in their standard state (at 25 °C [77 °F], 100 kPa). verify (what is ?) Infobox references

(E)-Stilbene, commonly known as trans-stilbene, is an organic compound represented by the condensed structural formula C_{6}H_{5}CH=CHC_{6}H_{5}. Classified as a diarylethene, it features a central ethylene moiety with one phenyl group substituent on each end of the carbon–carbon double bond. It has an (E) stereochemistry, meaning that the phenyl groups are located on opposite sides of the double bond, the opposite of its geometric isomer, cis-stilbene. Trans-stilbene occurs as a white crystalline solid at room temperature and is highly soluble in organic solvents. It can be converted to cis-stilbene photochemically, and further reacted to produce phenanthrene.

Stilbene was discovered in 1843 by the French chemist Auguste Laurent. The name "stilbene" is derived from the Greek word στίλβω (stilbo), which means "I shine", on account of the lustrous appearance of the compound.

== Isomers ==
The isomerization of stilbene under the influence of radiation.

Stilbene exists as two possible stereoisomers. One is trans-1,2-diphenylethylene, called (E)-stilbene or trans-stilbene. The second is cis-1,2-diphenylethylene, called (Z)-stilbene or cis-stilbene, and is sterically hindered and less stable because the steric interactions force the aromatic rings out-of-plane and prevent conjugation. Cis-stilbene is a liquid at room temperature (melting point: 5–6 °C (41–43 °F)), while trans-stilbene is a crystalline solid which does not melt until around 125 °C (257 °F), illustrating the two isomers have significantly different physical properties.

== Preparation and reactions ==
Many syntheses have been developed. One popular route entails reduction of benzoin using zinc amalgam.

C_{6}H_{5}–CH(OH)–C(=O)–C_{6}H_{5} $\ce{->[\ce{Zn(Hg)}][\ce{HCl} \text{, } \ce{CH3CH2OH}]}$ trans-C_{6}H_{5}–CH=CH–C_{6}H_{5}

Both isomers of stilbene can be produced by decarboxylation of α-phenylcinnamic acid, trans-stilbene being produced from the (Z)-isomer of the acid.

Richard F. Heck and Tsutomu Mizoroki independently reported the synthesis of trans-stilbene by coupling of iodobenzene and styrene using a palladium(II) catalyst, in what is now known as the Mizoroki-Heck reaction. The Mizoroki approach produced the higher yield.

Stilbene undergoes reactions typical of alkenes. Trans-stilbene undergoes epoxidation with peroxymonophosphoric acid, H_{3}PO_{5}, producing a 74% yield of trans-stilbene oxide in dioxane. The epoxide product formed is a racemic mixture of the two enantiomers of 1,2-diphenyloxirane. The achiral meso compound (1R,2S)-1,2-diphenyloxirane arises from cis-stilbene, though peroxide epoxidations of the cis-isomer produce both cis- and trans-epoxide products. For example, using tert-butyl hydroperoxide, oxidation of cis-stilbene produces 0.8% cis-stilbene oxide, 13.5% trans-stilbene oxide, and 6.1% benzaldehyde. Enantiopure stilbene oxide has been prepared by Nobel laureate Karl Barry Sharpless.

Stilbene can be cleanly oxidised to benzaldehyde by ozonolysis or Lemieux–Johnson oxidation, and stronger oxidants such as acidified potassium permanganate will produce benzoic acid. Vicinal diols can be produced via the Upjohn dihydroxylation or enantioselectively using Sharpless asymmetric dihydroxylation with enantiomeric excesses as high as 100%.

Bromination of trans-stilbene produces predominantly meso-1,2-dibromo-1,2-diphenylethane (sometimes called meso-stilbene dibromide), in line with a mechanism involving a cyclic bromonium ion intermediate of a typical electrophilic bromine addition reaction; cis-stilbene yields a racemic mixture of the two enantiomers of 1,2-dibromo-1,2-diphenylethane in a non-polar solvent such as carbon tetrachloride, but the extent of production of the meso compound increases with solvent polarity, with a yield of 90% in nitromethane. The formation of small quantities of the two enantiomers of stilbene dibromide from the trans-isomer suggests that the bromonium ion intermediate exists in chemical equilibrium with a carbocation intermediate PhCHBr–C^{+}(H)Ph with a vacant p orbital vulnerable to nucleophilic attack from either face. The addition of bromide or tribromide salts restores much of the stereospecificity even in solvents with a dielectric constant above 35.

Upon UV irradiation it converts to cis-stilbene, a classic example of a photochemical reaction involving trans-cis isomerization, and can undergo further reaction to form phenanthrene.

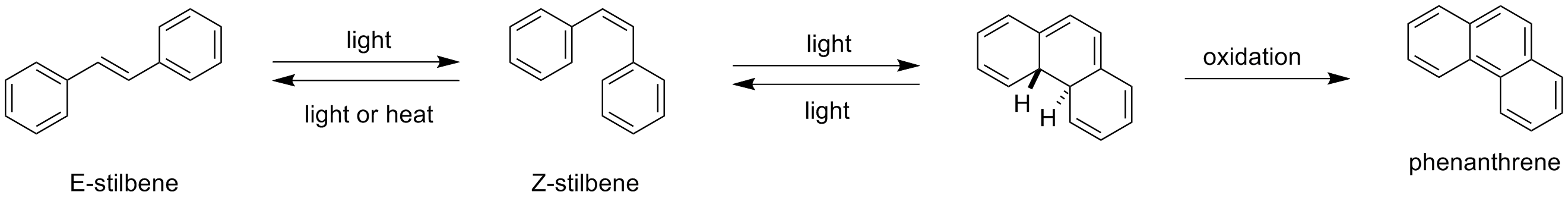

== Derivatives and uses ==
=== Synthetic ===
(E)-Stilbene itself is of little value, but it is a precursor to other derivatives used as dyes, optical brighteners, phosphors, and scintillators. Stilbene is one of the gain mediums used in dye lasers.

4,4′-diamino-2,2′-stilbenedisulfonic acid is a popular optical brightener used in some laundry detergents.

Diethylstilbestrol exhibits estrogenic properties, even though it is not a steroid.

Disodium 4,4'-dinitrostilbene-2,2'-disulfonate is prepared by the sulfonation of 4-nitrotoluene to form 4-nitrotoluene-2-sulfonic acid, which can then be oxidatively coupled using sodium hypochlorite to form the (E)-stilbene derivative in a process originally developed by Arthur George Green and André Wahl in the late nineteenth century. Improvements to the process with higher yields have been developed, using air oxidation in liquid ammonia. The product is useful as its reaction with aniline derivatives results in the formation of azo dyes. Commercially important dyes derived from this compound include Direct Red 76, Direct Brown 78, and Direct Orange 40.

=== Natural stilbenes ===
The stilbenoids are naturally occurring stilbene derivatives. Examples include resveratrol and its cousin, pterostilbene. The stilbestrols, which are structurally but not synthetically related to (E)-stilbene, exhibit estrogenic activity. Members of this group include diethylstilbestrol, fosfestrol, and dienestrol. Some such derivative are produced by condensation of coenzyme A derivatives of cinnamic acid or 4-hydroxycinnamic acid and the malonic acid.

== Appendix ==
Table 1. Vapor pressures

Isomer	Temperature, °C	Vapor pressure, kPa
cis-stilbene	100	0.199
cis-stilbene	125	0.765
cis-stilbene	150	2.51
trans-stilbene	150	0.784
