= 1,8-Diazafluoren-9-one =

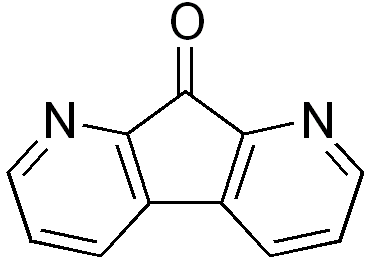
- 1,8-Diazafluoren-9-one

Names
- Preferred IUPAC name 9H-Cyclopenta[1,2-b:4,3-b′]dipyridin-9-one
- Other names DFO; 9H-1,8-Diazafluoren-9-one; 9H-Pyrido[3′,2′:3,4]cyclopenta[1,2-b]pyridin-9-one

Identifiers
CAS Number	54078-29-4
3D model (JSmol)	Interactive image; Interactive image
ChemSpider	633891
PubChem CID	725961
UNII	V3B9KD3X5K
CompTox Dashboard (EPA)	DTXSID10352406
- InChI: InChI=1S/C11H6N2O/c14-11-9-7(3-1-5-12-9)8-4-2-6-13-10(8)11/h1-6H Key: FOSUVSBKUIWVKI-UHFFFAOYSA-N; InChI=1/C11H6N2O/c14-11-9-7(3-1-5-12-9)8-4-2-6-13-10(8)11/h1-6H Key: FOSUVSBKUIWVKI-UHFFFAOYAH
- SMILES: O=C1C3=C(C=CC=N3)C2=C1N=CC=C2; O=C3c1ncccc1c2c3nccc2

Properties
Chemical formula	C_{11}H_{6}N_{2}O
Molar mass	182.182 g·mol^{−1}
Appearance	Yellow powder
Melting point	229–233 °C (444–451 °F; 502–506 K)

Hazards
- GHS labelling
Pictograms	(GHS07: Exclamation mark)
NFPA 704 (fire diamond)	2 1 0
- Except where otherwise noted, data are given for materials in their standard state (at 25 °C [77 °F], 100 kPa). verify (what is ?) Infobox references

1,8-Diazafluoren-9-one (DFO) is an aromatic ketone first synthesized in 1950. It is used to find fingerprints and blood on porous surfaces. It makes fingerprints glow when they are lit by blue-green light.

DFO reacts with amino acids present in the fingerprint to form highly fluorescent derivatives. Excitation with light at ~470 nm results in emission at ~570 nm.
