= Phenanthrene =

Polycyclic aromatic hydrocarbon composed of three fused benzene rings

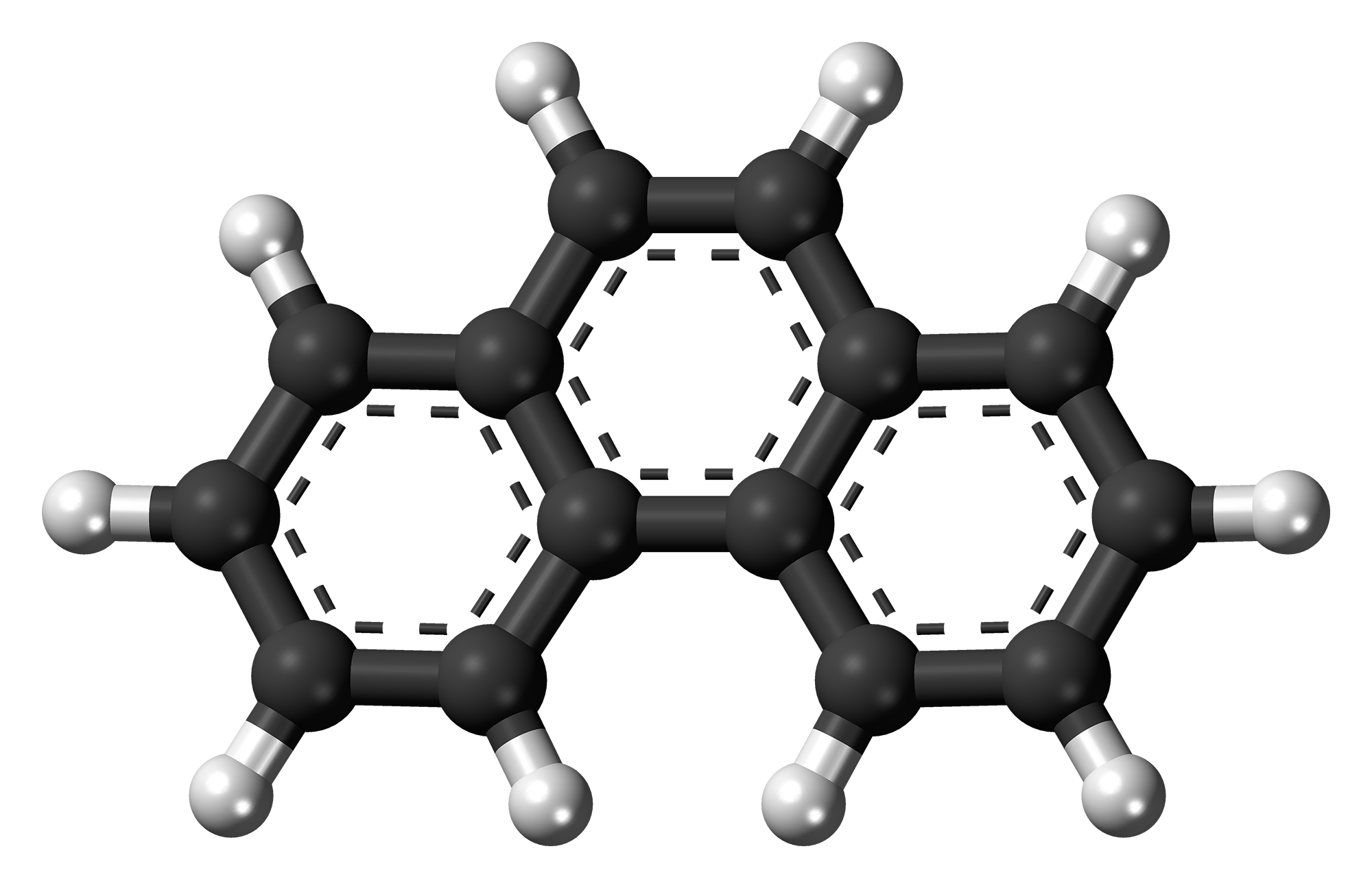

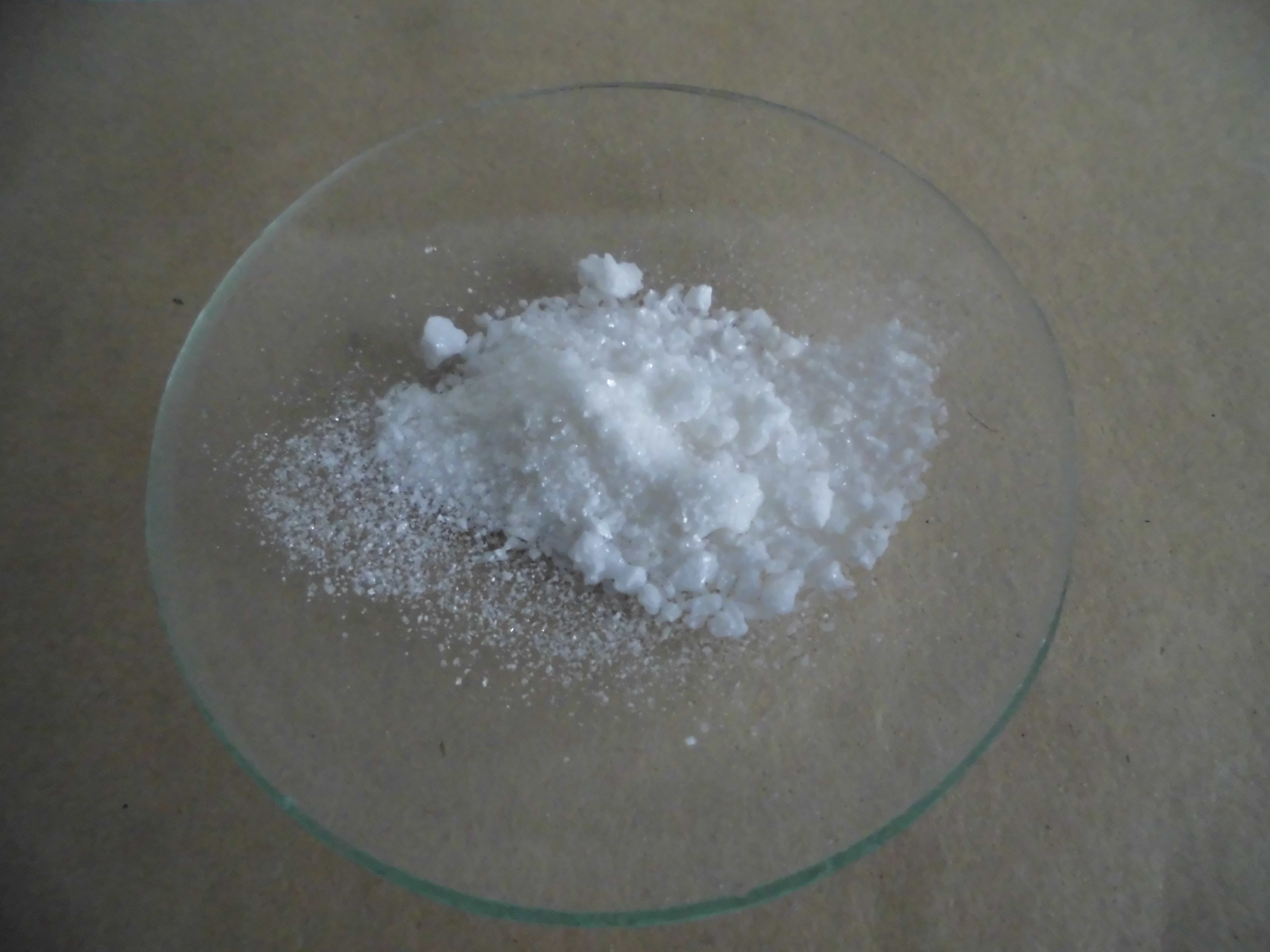
- Phenanthrene

Names
- Preferred IUPAC name Phenanthrene

Identifiers
| CAS Number | 85-01-8 |
| 3D model (JSmol) | Interactive image |
| Beilstein Reference | 1905428 |
| ChEBI | CHEBI:28851 |
| ChemSpider | 970 |
| ECHA InfoCard | 100.001.437 |
| EC Number | 266-028-2 |
| Gmelin Reference | 28699 |
| KEGG | C11422 |
| MeSH | C031181 |
| PubChem CID | 995 |
| UNII | 448J8E5BST |
| CompTox Dashboard (EPA) | DTXSID6024254 |
- InChI: InChI=1S/C14H10/c1-3-7-13-11(5-1)9-10-12-6-2-4-8-14(12)13/h1-10H Key: YNPNZTXNASCQKK-UHFFFAOYSA-N; InChI=1/C14H10/c1-3-7-13-11(5-1)9-10-12-6-2-4-8-14(12)13/h1-10H Key: YNPNZTXNASCQKK-UHFFFAOYAC
- SMILES: C1=CC=C2C(=C1)C=CC3=CC=CC=C32

Properties
| Chemical formula | C_{14}H_{10} |
| Molar mass | 178.234 g·mol^{−1} |
| Appearance | Colorless solid |
| Density | 1.18 g/cm^{3} |
| Melting point | 101 °C (214 °F; 374 K) |
| Boiling point | 332 °C (630 °F; 605 K) |
| Solubility in water | 1.6 mg/L |
| Magnetic susceptibility (χ) | −127.9·10^{−6} cm^{3}/mol |

Hazards
| NFPA 704 (fire diamond) | 1 1 0 |
| Flash point | 171 °C (340 °F; 444 K) |

Structure
| Point group | C_{2v} |
| Dipole moment | 0 D |
- Except where otherwise noted, data are given for materials in their standard state (at 25 °C [77 °F], 100 kPa). verify (what is ?) Infobox references

Phenanthrene is a polycyclic aromatic hydrocarbon (PAH) with formula C_{14}H_{10}, consisting of three fused benzene rings. It is a colorless, crystal-like solid, but can also appear yellow. Phenanthrene is used to make dyes, plastics, pesticides, explosives, and drugs. It has also been used to make bile acids, cholesterol and steroids.

Phenanthrene occurs naturally and also is a man-made chemical. Commonly, humans are exposed to phenanthrene through inhalation of cigarette smoke, but there are many routes of exposure. Animal studies have shown that phenanthrene is a potential carcinogen. However, according to IARC, it is not identified as a probable, possible or confirmed human carcinogen.

Phenanthrene's three fused rings are angled as in the phenacenes, rather than straight as in the acenes. The compounds with a phenanthrene skeleton but with nitrogen atoms in place of CH sites are known as phenanthrolines.

== History and etymology ==
Phenanthrene was discovered in coal tar in 1872 independently by Carl Graebe (article manuscript received on November 1st) as well as by Wilhelm Rudolph Fittig and his doctoral student Eugen Ostermayer (manuscript received on November 19th but Ostermayer defended his dissertation in August). Fittig and Ostermayer were able to determine the structure of the compound by oxidizing it first to a corresponding quinone and then to diphenic acid, and soon Graebe confirmed it by a synthesis from stilbene.

Prior to February 1873 Fittig sent a letter to Graebe where he proposed to name the hydrocarbon phenanthrene (German: Phenanthren) in order to account for its similarity to biphenyl and anthracene, which was swiftly adopted.

== Physical properties ==
Phenanthrene is nearly insoluble in water but is soluble in most low-polarity organic solvents such as toluene, carbon tetrachloride, ether, chloroform, acetic acid and benzene.

Phenanthrene is fluorescent under ultraviolet light, exhibiting a large Stoke shift. It can be used in scintillators.

== Chemistry ==
Reactions of phenanthrene typically occur at the 9 and 10 positions, including:

- Oxidation with chromic acid gives phenanthrenequinone.
- Organic reduction to 9,10-dihydrophenanthrene with hydrogen gas and raney nickel
- Electrophilic halogenation to 9-bromophenanthrene with bromine
- Aromatic sulfonation to 2 and 3-phenanthrenesulfonic acids with sulfuric acid
- Ozonolysis to diphenylaldehyde

== Productions ==
Phenanthrene is extracted from coal tar, of which it comprises 5% by weight.

In principle it could be obtained by chemical synthesis. The Bardhan–Sengupta phenanthrene synthesis is a classic way to make phenanthrenes.

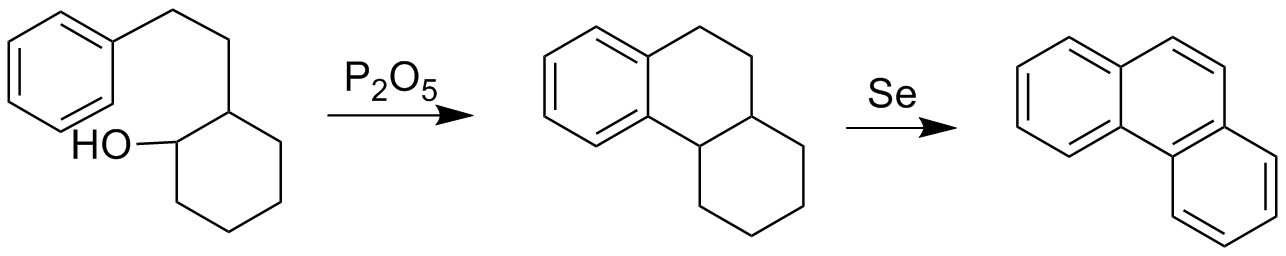

This process involves electrophilic aromatic substitution using a tethered cyclohexanol group using diphosphorus pentoxide, which closes the central ring onto an existing aromatic ring. Dehydrogenation using selenium aromatizes the other rings into aromatic ones as well. The aromatization of six-membered rings produces H_{2}Se.

Phenanthrene can also be obtained photochemically from certain diarylethenes (Mallory reaction):

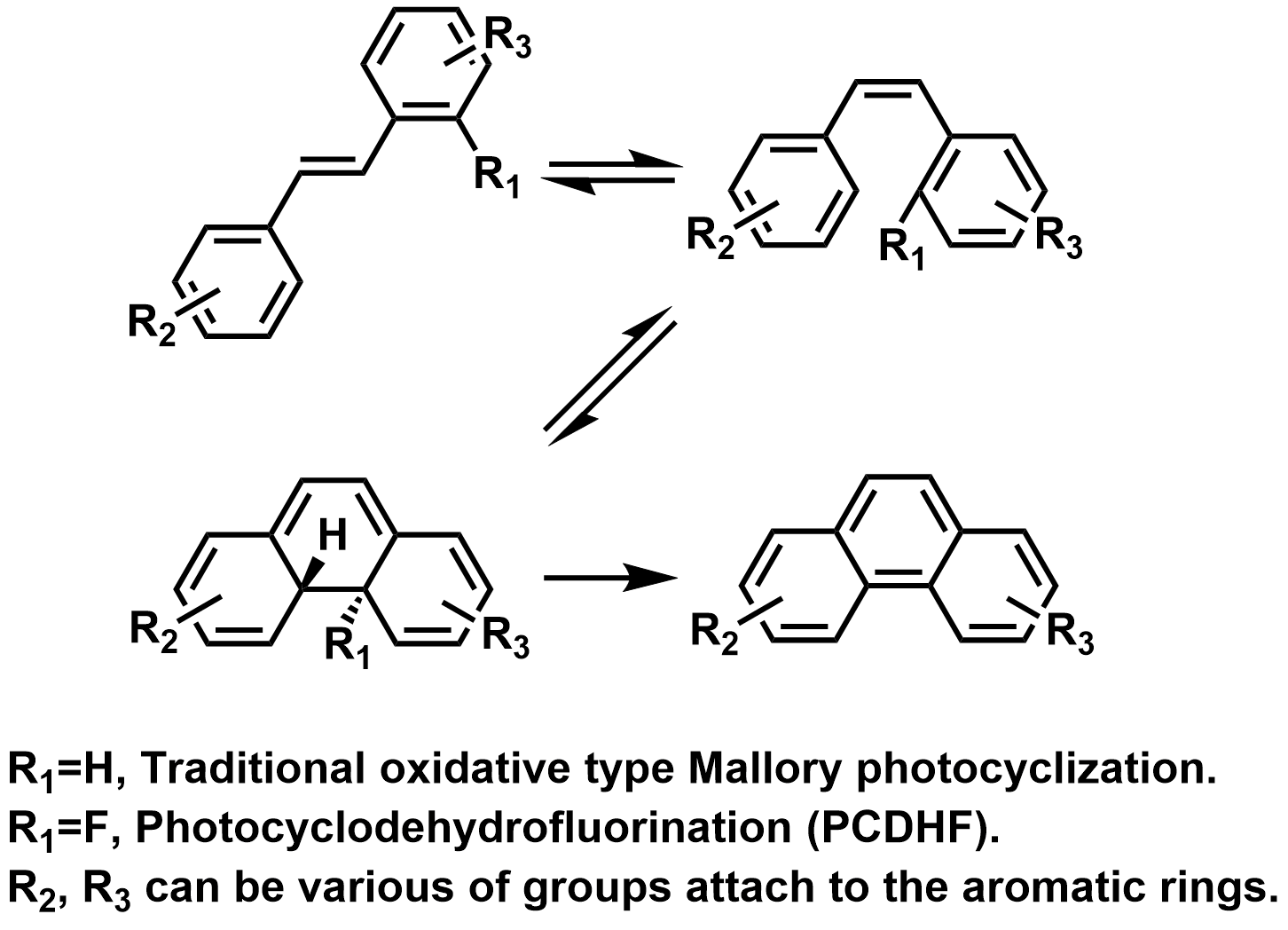

Other synthesis routes include the Haworth reaction and the Wagner-Meerwein-type ring-expansion, as depicted below:

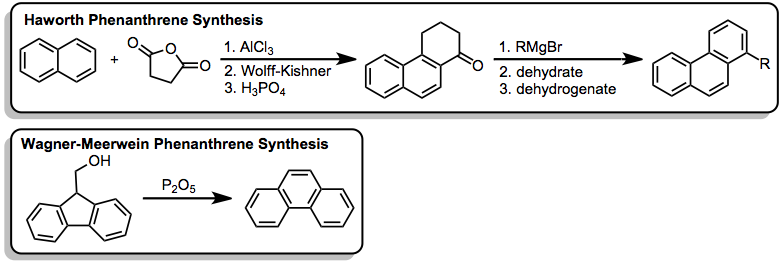

Commercially phenanthrene is not synthesized but extracted from the byproducts of coal coking, since it makes around 4–6% of coke oven coal tar.

== Natural occurrences of the phenanthrene derivatives ==
Structure of morphinan, which features a partially reduced phenanthroline core

Morphinan is the chemical structure found in several psychoactive drugs, consisting of opiate analgesics, cough suppressants, and dissociative hallucinogens, among others. Examples morphine, codeine, and dextromethorphan (DXM).

Ravatite is a natural mineral consisting of phenanthrene. It is found in small amounts among a few coal burning sites. Ravatite represents a small group of organic minerals.

=== In plants ===
Phenanthrene derivatives occur in plants as phenanthrenoids. They have been reported from flowering plants, mainly in the family Orchidaceae, and a few in the families Dioscoreaceae, Combretaceae and Betulaceae, as well as in the lower plant class Marchantiophyta (liverworts).

== See also ==
- Chrysene
- Anthracene
- Phenanthroline
