= Fluorenol =

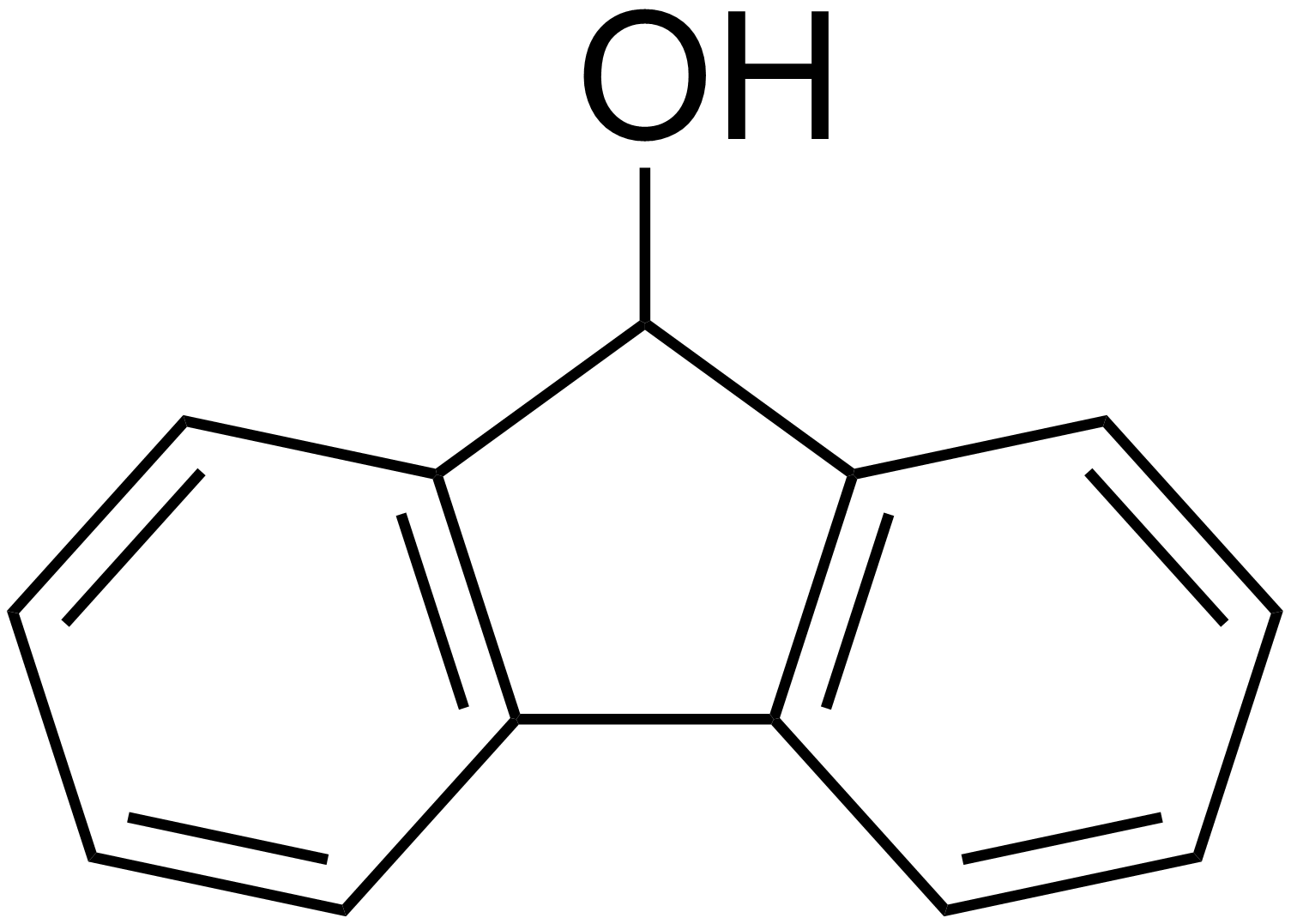

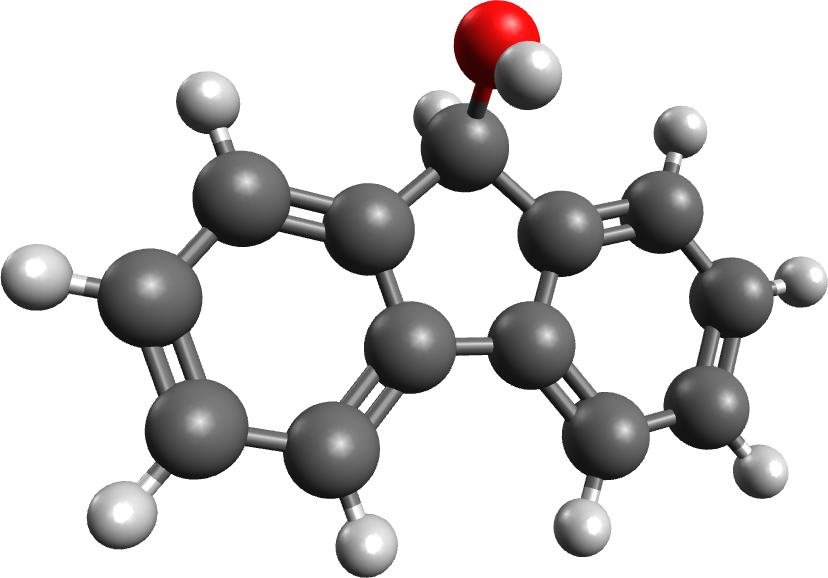

Names
- IUPAC name 9H-Fluoren-9-ol
- Other names 9-Hydroxyfluorene

Identifiers
| CAS Number | 1689-64-1 |
| 3D model (JSmol) | Interactive image |
| ChEBI | CHEBI:16904 |
| ChemSpider | 66916 |
| ECHA InfoCard | 100.015.345 |
| EC Number | 216-879-0 |
| PubChem CID | 74318 |
| UNII | BV0Q72R613 |
| CompTox Dashboard (EPA) | DTXSID4052683 |
- InChI: InChI=1S/C13H10O/c14-13-11-7-3-1-5-9(11)10-6-2-4-8-12(10)13/h1-8,13-14H Key: AFMVESZOYKHDBJ-UHFFFAOYSA-N; InChI=1/C13H10O/c14-13-11-7-3-1-5-9(11)10-6-2-4-8-12(10)13/h1-8,13-14H Key: AFMVESZOYKHDBJ-UHFFFAOYAM
- SMILES: C1=CC=C2C(=C1)C(C3=CC=CC=C32)O

Properties
| Chemical formula | C_{13}H_{10}O |
| Molar mass | 182.22 g/mol |
| Appearance | Off-white crystalline powder |
| Density | 1.151 g/mL |
| Melting point | 152 to 155 °C (306 to 311 °F; 425 to 428 K) |
| Solubility in water | Practically insoluble |

Hazards
| NFPA 704 (fire diamond) | 0 0 0 |
- Except where otherwise noted, data are given for materials in their standard state (at 25 °C [77 °F], 100 kPa). verify (what is ?) Infobox references

Fluorenol, also known as hydrafinil, is an alcohol derivative of fluorene. In the most significant isomer, fluoren-9-ol or 9-hydroxyfluorene, the hydroxy group is located on the bridging carbon between the two benzene rings. Hydroxyfluorene can be converted to fluorenone by oxidants. It is a white-cream colored solid at room temperature.

== Toxicity ==
Fluorenol is toxic to aquatic organisms including algae, bacteria, and crustaceans. Fluorenol was patented as an insecticide in 1939, and is an algaecide against the green algae genera Dunaliella.

Toxicity and carcinogenicity in humans are unknown.

== Mechanism of action ==
The mechanism of action of fluorenol is unknown.

The lipophilicity of fluorenol (LogP 2.4) is higher than that of drugs like modafinil (LogP 1.7) and amphetamine (LogP 1.8), suggesting that it may penetrate the blood brain barrier more readily.

== Eugeroic ==
A study published by Cephalon describing research to develop a successor to the eugeroic modafinil reported that the corresponding fluorenol derivative was 39% more effective than modafinil at keeping mice awake over a 4-hour period. However, after further investigation it was determined that the eugeroic activity of the fluorenol analog was likely due to an active metabolite, which they identify as fluorenol itself. Fluorenol is a weak dopamine reuptake inhibitor with an IC_{50} of 9 μM, notably 59% weaker than modafinil (IC_{50} = 3.70 μM), potentially making it even less liable for addiction. It also showed no affinity for cytochrome P450 2C19, unlike modafinil.

There is no evidence (binding assays, occupancy, predicted structure) to suggest that fluorenol acts on serotonin receptors, contrary to some popular claims.

== Sale as research chemical ==
The unscheduled nature of fluorenol has caused it to fall into a legal grey area in most countries. Despite being associated with modafinil, fluorenol is not a substituted derivative of it, making its scheduling unimplied by analogue acts.

Fluorenol is a relatively obscure compound in the research chemical market. According to an online survey with over 3000 respondents, only 2% of modafinil users have reported using fluorenol.

== See also ==
- Adrafinil
- Armodafinil
- CRL-40,940
- CRL-40,941
- Fluorenone
