= Optical brightener =

Chemical compounds that absorb and re-emit light

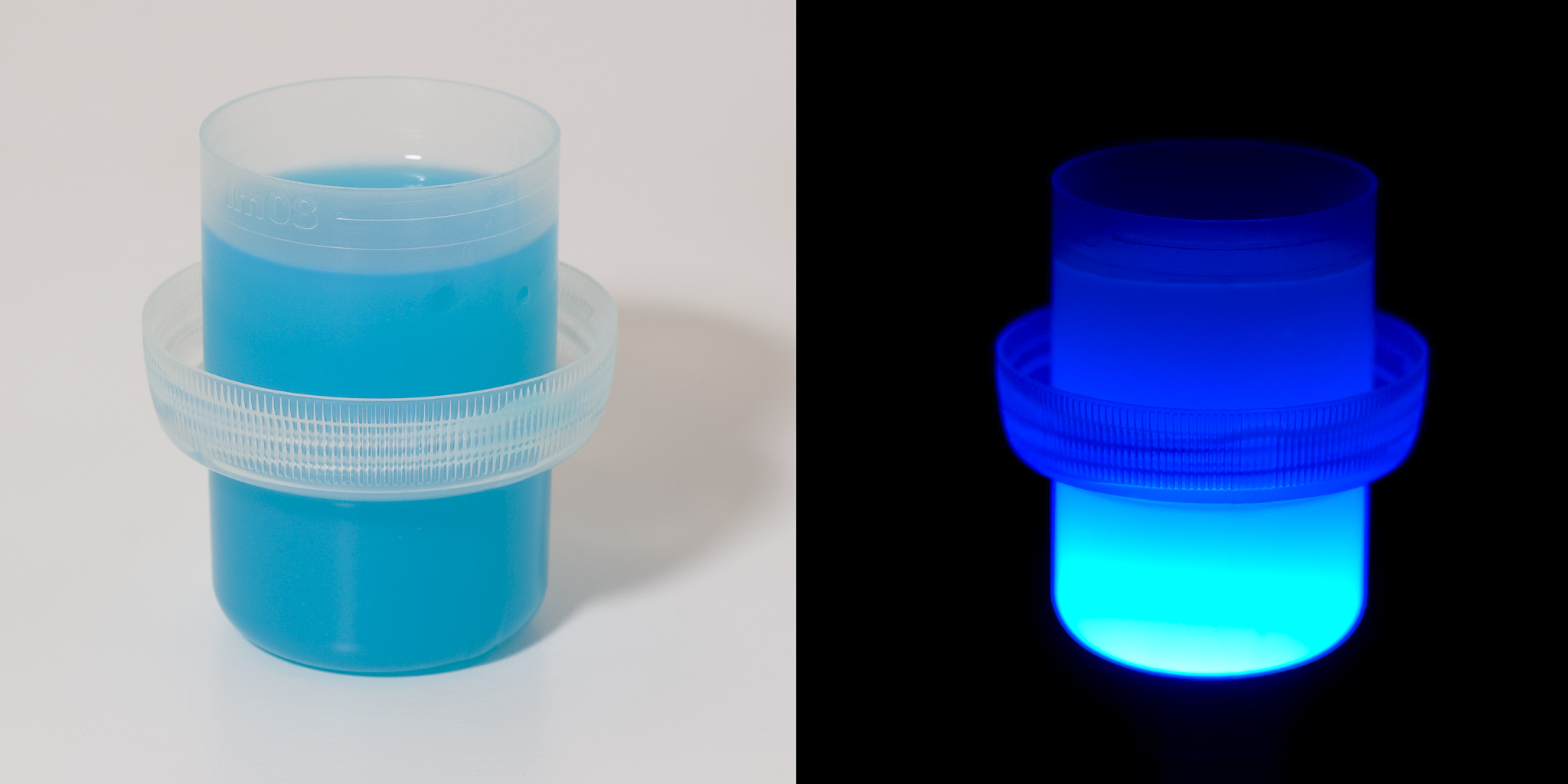
Laundry detergent fluorescing under ultraviolet light

Optical brighteners, optical brightening agents (OBAs), fluorescent brightening agents (FBAs), or fluorescent whitening agents (FWAs), are chemical compounds that absorb light in the ultraviolet and violet region (usually 340-370 nm) of the electromagnetic spectrum, and re-emit light in the blue region (typically 420-470 nm) through the phenomenon of fluorescence. These additives are often used to enhance the appearance of color of fabric and paper, causing a "whitening" effect; they make intrinsically yellow/orange materials look less so, by compensating the deficit in blue and violet light reflected by the material, with the blue and violet optical emission of the fluorophore.

== Properties ==
The most common classes of compounds with this property are the stilbenes, e.g., 4,4′-diamino-2,2′-stilbenedisulfonic acid. Older, non-commercial fluorescent compounds include umbelliferone, which absorbs in the UV portion of the spectrum and re-emit it in the blue portion of the visible spectrum. A white surface treated with an optical brightener can emit more visible light than that which shines on it, making it appear brighter. The blue light emitted by the brightener compensates for the diminishing blue of the treated material and changes the hue away from yellow or brown and toward white.

4,4′-diamino-2,2′-stilbenedisulfonic acid is a popular optical brightener.

4,4'-bis(benzoxazolyl)-cis-stilbene and 2,5-bis(benzoxazol-2-yl)thiophene (shown here) are also intensely fluorescent and used as optical brighteners, e.g., in laundry detergents.

Approximately 400 brightener types are listed in the international Colour Index database, but fewer than 90 are produced commercially, and only a handful are commercially important. The Colour Index Generic Names and Constitution Numbers can be assigned to a specific substance. However, some are duplicated, since manufacturers apply for the index number when they produce it. The global OBA production for paper, textiles, and detergents is dominated by just a few di- and tetra-sulfonated triazole-stilbenes and a di-sulfonated stilbene-biphenyl derivatives. The stilbene derivatives are subject to fading upon prolonged exposure to UV, due to the formation of optically inactive cis-stilbenes. They are also degraded by oxygen in air, like most dye colorants. All brighteners have extended conjugation and/or aromaticity, allowing for electron movement. Some non-stilbene brighteners are used in more permanent applications such as whitening synthetic fiber.

Brighteners can be "boosted" by the addition of certain polyols, such as high molecular weight polyethylene glycol or polyvinyl alcohol. These additives increase the visible blue light emissions significantly. Brighteners can also be "quenched". Excess brightener will often cause a greening effect as emissions start to show above the blue region in the visible spectrum.

== Common uses ==
Brighteners are commonly added to laundry detergents to make the clothes appear cleaner. Normally cleaned laundry appears yellowish, which consumers do not like. Optical brighteners have replaced bluing which was formerly used to produce the same effect.

Brighteners are used in many papers, especially high brightness papers, resulting in their strongly fluorescent appearance under UV illumination. Paper brightness is typically measured at 457 nm, well within the fluorescent activity range of brighteners. Paper used for banknotes does not contain optical brighteners, so a common method for detecting counterfeit notes is to check for fluorescence.

Optical brighteners have also found use in cosmetics. One application is to formulas for washing and conditioning grey or blonde hair, where the brightener can not only increase the luminance and sparkle of the hair, but can also correct dull, yellowish discoloration without darkening the hair. Some advanced face and eye powders contain optical brightener microspheres that brighten shadowed or dark areas of the skin, such as "tired eyes".

End uses of optical brighteners include:

1. Detergent whitener (instead of bluing agents)
2. Paper brightening (internal or in a coating)
3. Fiber whitening (internal, added to polymer melts)
4. Textile whitening (external, added to fabric finishes)
5. Color-correcting or brightening additive in advanced cosmetic formulas (shampoos, conditioners, eye makeup)

== Misuse ==
From around 2002 to 2012, chemical brighteners were used by many Chinese farmers to enhance the appearance of their white mushrooms. This illegal use was mostly eliminated by the Chinese Ministry of Agriculture.
