= 1,1-Diphenylethylene =

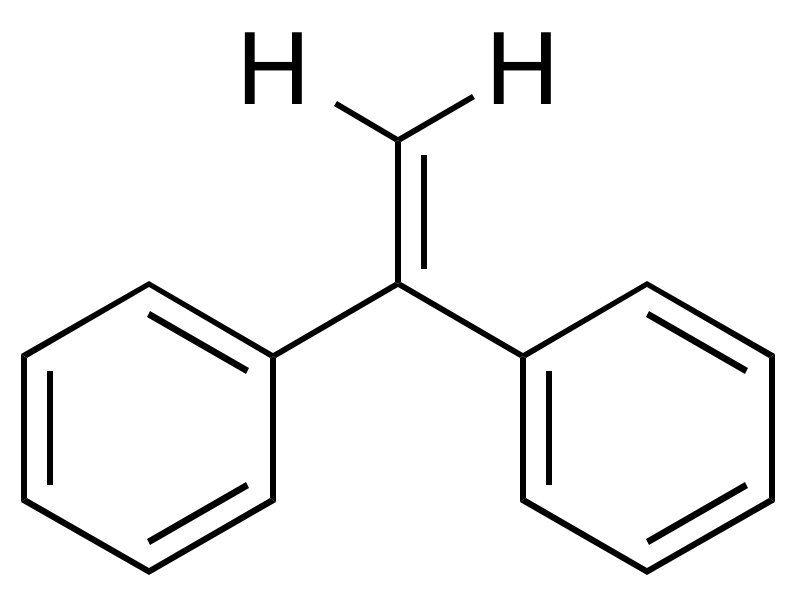

Names
- Preferred IUPAC name 1,1′-(Ethene-1,1-diyl)dibenzene
- Other names Ethene-1,1-diyldibenzene

Identifiers
CAS Number	530-48-3
3D model (JSmol)	Interactive image
ChemSpider	10287
ECHA InfoCard	100.007.712
PubChem CID	10740
UNII	BX0L5B6LLL
CompTox Dashboard (EPA)	DTXSID5060190
- InChI: InChI=1S/C14H12/c1-12(13-8-4-2-5-9-13)14-10-6-3-7-11-14/h2-11H,1H2 Key: ZMYIIHDQURVDRB-UHFFFAOYSA-N
- SMILES: C=C(C1=CC=CC=C1)C2=CC=CC=C2

Properties
Chemical formula	C_{14}H_{12}
Molar mass	180.250 g·mol^{−1}
Melting point	8 °C
Boiling point	277 °C
- Except where otherwise noted, data are given for materials in their standard state (at 25 °C [77 °F], 100 kPa). Infobox references

1,1-Diphenylethylene is an organic compound with chemical formula (C_{6}H_{5})_{2}C=CH_{2}. It is a colorless to light orange to yellow clear liquid.

== Properties ==
1,1-Diphenylethylene mediates the radical polymerization of methyl acrylate or styrene. Mediation by 1,1-diphenylethylene generates low molecular weight polymer by a termination reaction. Additionally, because 1,1-diphenylethylene has a lower pKa than styrene, it is an effective mediator in the anionic living polymerization of styrene-block-methyl methacrylate copolymers. Polystyrene homopolymers can be "capped" with 1,1-Diphenylethylene before adding methyl methacrylate, effectively adjusting the pKa of the active chain end so that 1,4-addition to methyl methacrylate is favored over 1,2-addition. Dibenzofulvene is an analogue of a 1,1-Diphenylethylene.

== Synthesis ==
1,1-Diphenylethylene is prepared commercially by alkylating benzene with styrene to give 1,1-diphenylethane. This conversion requires a zeolite catalyst. In a subsequent step, this ethane derivative undergoes dehydrogenation:

C_{6}H_{5}CH=CH_{2} + C_{6}H_{6} → (C_{6}H_{5})_{2}CHCH_{3}
(C_{6}H_{5})_{2}CHCH_{3} → (C_{6}H_{5})_{2}C=CH_{2} + H_{2}

A laboratory route to 1,1-diphenylethylene entails dehydration of 1,1-diphenylethanol.

== See also ==
- Dibenzofulvene
- Stilbene
