= Phenanthrenequinone =

Names
- Preferred IUPAC name Phenanthrene-9,10-dione
- Other names 9,10-Phenanthrenequinone

Identifiers
CAS Number	84-11-7
3D model (JSmol)	Interactive image
Beilstein Reference	608838
ChEBI	CHEBI:37454
ChEMBL	ChEMBL51931
ChemSpider	6505
ECHA InfoCard	100.001.377
EC Number	201-515-5
KEGG	C03243
PubChem CID	6763
UNII	42L7BZ8H74
CompTox Dashboard (EPA)	DTXSID3058901
- InChI: InChI=1S/C14H8O2/c15-13-11-7-3-1-5-9(11)10-6-2-4-8-12(10)14(13)16/h1-8H Key: YYVYAPXYZVYDHN-UHFFFAOYSA-N
- SMILES: C1=CC=C2C(=C1)C3=CC=CC=C3C(=O)C2=O

Properties
Chemical formula	C_{14}H_{8}O_{2}
Molar mass	208.216 g·mol^{−1}
Appearance	Orange solid
Odor	Odorless
Melting point	209 °C (408 °F; 482 K)
Boiling point	360 °C (680 °F; 633 K)
Solubility in water	Slightly soluble (7.5 mg L^{−1})

Hazards
- GHS labelling
Pictograms	(GHS09: Environmental hazard) (GHS07: Exclamation mark)
Signal word	Warning
Hazard statements	H315, H319, H400
Precautionary statements	P264, P273, P280, P302+P352, P305+P351+P338, P332+P313, P337+P313, P362, P391, P501
NFPA 704 (fire diamond)	1 1 1
Safety data sheet (SDS)	External MSDS
- Except where otherwise noted, data are given for materials in their standard state (at 25 °C [77 °F], 100 kPa). Infobox references

Phenanthrenedione is a quinone derivative of a polycyclic aromatic hydrocarbon. It is an orange, water-insoluble solid.

== Laboratory synthesis and use ==
It has been prepared by oxidation of phenanthrene with chromic acid.

It is used as an artificial mediator for electron acceptor/donor in Mo/W containing formate dehydrogenase reduction of carbon dioxide to formate and vice versa. It is a better electron acceptor than the natural nicotinamide adenine dinucleotide (NAD^{+}).

== Safety ==
It is cytotoxic and potentially mutagenic.

Phenanthrenequinone is one of many contributors to harmful particulate emissions from diesel motor vehicles.

== Related compounds ==
- 1,10-Phenanthroline-5,6-dione
