= Stilbene =

Stilbene may refer to one of the two stereoisomers of 1,2-diphenylethene:

- (E)-Stilbene (trans isomer)
- (Z)-Stilbene (cis isomer)

== See also ==
- Stilbenoids, a class of molecules found in plants
- 1,1-Diphenylethylene
