= Fluorene =

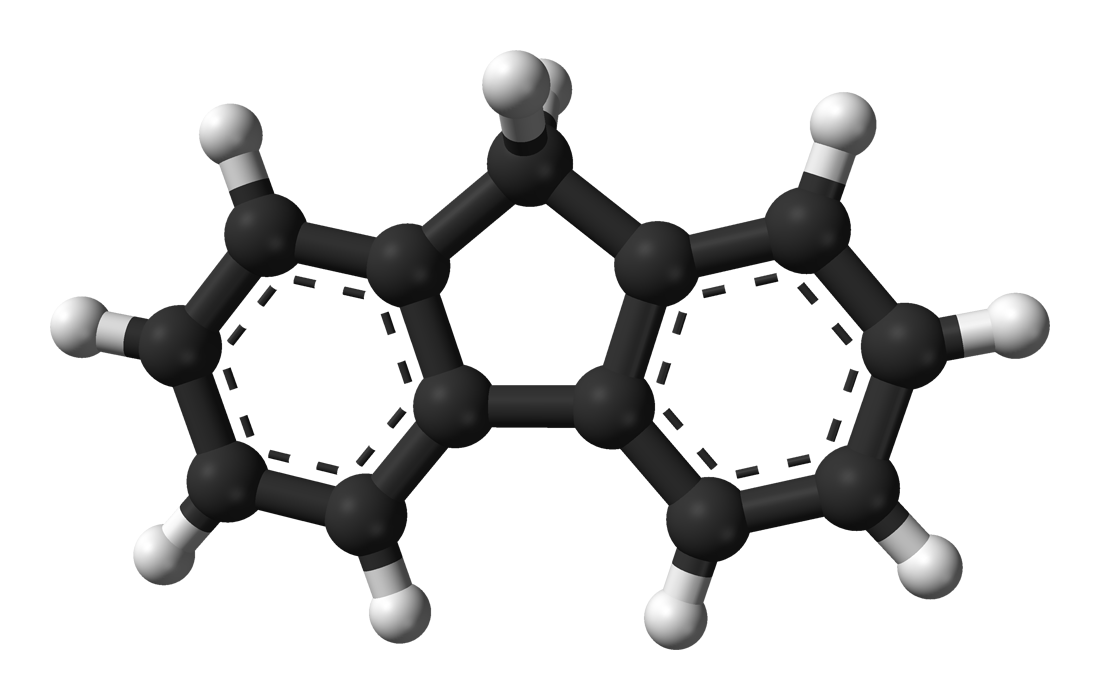

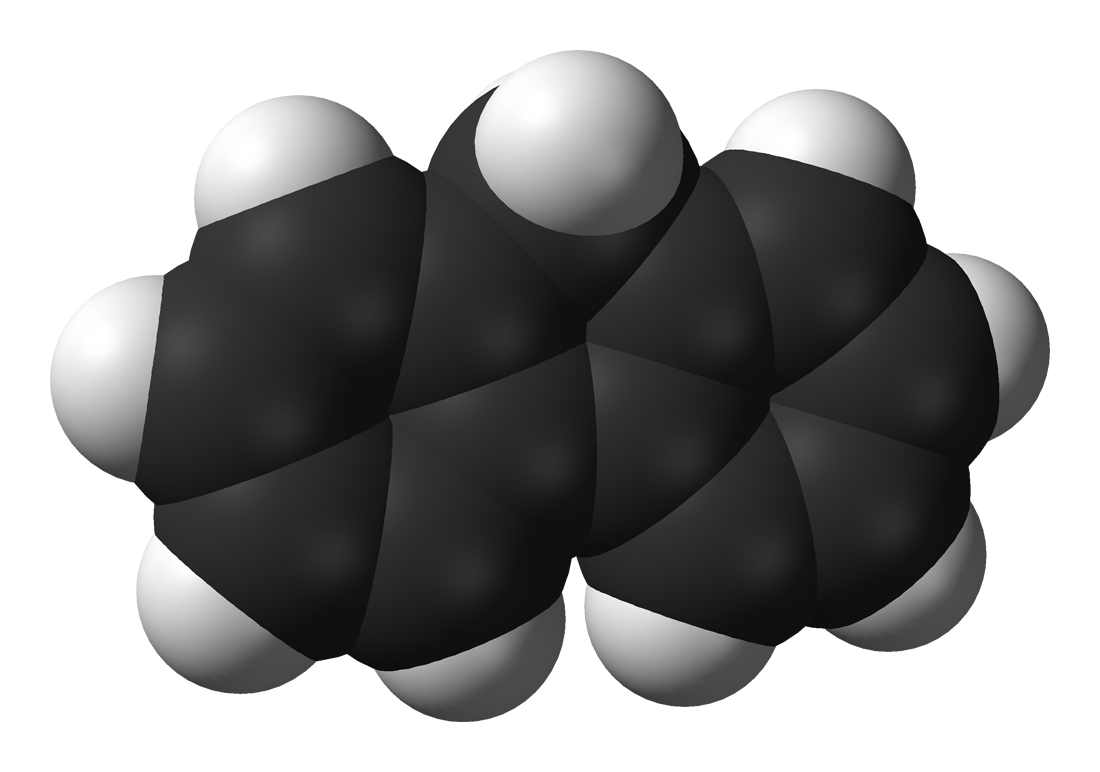

Names
- Preferred IUPAC name 9H-Fluorene
- Systematic IUPAC name Tricyclo[7.4.0.0^{2,7}]trideca-2,4,6,9,11,13-hexaene

Identifiers
CAS Number	86-73-7
3D model (JSmol)	Interactive image
ChEBI	CHEBI:28266
ChEMBL	ChEMBL16236
ChemSpider	6592
ECHA InfoCard	100.001.541
EC Number	201-695-5
KEGG	C07715
PubChem CID	6853
RTECS number	LL5670000
UNII	3Q2UY0968A
CompTox Dashboard (EPA)	DTXSID8024105
- InChI: InChI=1S/C13H10/c1-3-7-12-10(5-1)9-11-6-2-4-8-13(11)12/h1-8H,9H2 Key: NIHNNTQXNPWCJQ-UHFFFAOYSA-N; InChI=1/C13H10/c1-3-7-12-10(5-1)9-11-6-2-4-8-13(11)12/h1-8H,9H2 Key: NIHNNTQXNPWCJQ-UHFFFAOYAW
- SMILES: c1ccc2c3ccccc3Cc2c1

Properties
Chemical formula	C_{13}H_{10}
Molar mass	166.223 g·mol^{−1}
Density	1.202 g/mL
Melting point	116 to 117 °C (241 to 243 °F; 389 to 390 K)
Boiling point	295 °C (563 °F; 568 K)
Solubility in water	1.992 mg/L
Solubility	organic solvents
log P	4.18
Acidity (pK_{a})	22.6
Magnetic susceptibility (χ)	−110.5×10^{−6} cm^{3}/mol

Hazards
NFPA 704 (fire diamond)	1 1 0
Flash point	152 °C (306 °F; 425 K)
- Lethal dose or concentration (LD, LC)
LD_{50} (median dose)	16000 mg/kg (oral, rat)
Safety data sheet (SDS)	Sigma-Aldrich
- Except where otherwise noted, data are given for materials in their standard state (at 25 °C [77 °F], 100 kPa). verify (what is ?) Infobox references

Fluorene /ˈflʊəriːn/, or 9H-fluorene is an organic compound with the formula (C_{6}H_{4})_{2}CH_{2}. It forms white crystals that exhibit a characteristic, aromatic odor similar to that of naphthalene. Despite its name, it does not contain the element fluorine, but rather it comes from the violet fluorescence it exhibits. For commercial purposes it is obtained from coal tar, where it was discovered and named by Marcellin Berthelot in 1867.

As a polycyclic aromatic hydrocarbon, it is insoluble in water and soluble in many organic solvents. However, thanks to its central ring, fluorene is relatively acidic – powerful bases may remove one of the protons of the CH_{2} group.

== Synthesis, structure, and reactivity ==
Although fluorene is obtained from coal tar, it can also be prepared by dehydrogenation of diphenylmethane. Alternatively, it can be prepared by the reduction of fluorenone with zinc or hypophosphorous acid–iodine. The fluorene molecule is nearly planar, although each of the two benzene rings is coplanar with the central carbon 9.

Fluorene can be found after the incomplete combustion of plastics such as polystyrene, polyethylene and polyvinyl chloride.

=== Acidity ===
The C9–H sites of the fluorene ring are weakly acidic (pK_{a} = 22.6 in DMSO). Deprotonation gives the stable fluorenyl anion, nominally C_{13}H^{−}_{9}, which is aromatic and has an intense orange colour. The anion is a nucleophile. Electrophiles react with it by adding to the 9-position. The purification of fluorene exploits its acidity and the low solubility of its sodium derivative in hydrocarbon solvents.

Both protons can be removed from C9. For example, 9,9-fluorenyldipotassium can be obtained by treating fluorene with potassium metal in boiling dioxane.

=== Ligand properties ===
Fluorene and its derivatives can be deprotonated to give ligands akin to cyclopentadienide.

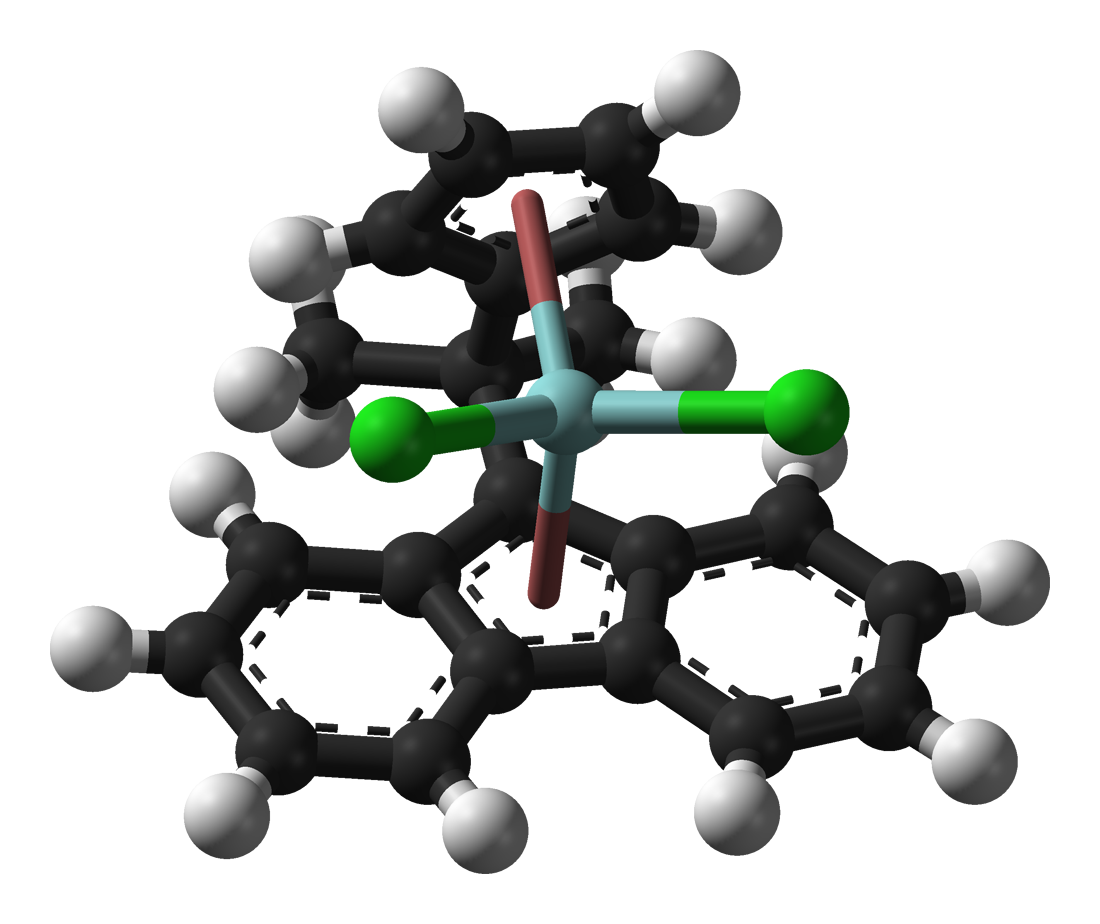
A fluorenyl-derived Kaminsky precatalyst for producing syndiotactic polypropylene.

== Uses ==
Fluorene is a precursor to other fluorene compounds; the parent species has few applications. Fluorene-9-carboxylic acid is a precursor to pharmaceuticals. Oxidation of fluorene gives fluorenone, which is nitrated to give commercially useful derivatives. 9-Fluorenylmethyl chloroformate (Fmoc chloride) is used to introduce the 9-fluorenylmethyl carbamate (Fmoc) protecting group on amines in peptide synthesis.

Polyfluorene polymers (where carbon 7 of one unit is linked to carbon 2 of the next one, displacing two hydrogens) are electrically conductive and electroluminescent, and have been much investigated as a luminophore in organic light-emitting diodes.

Fluorene is used to make 9-benzylfluorene [1572-46-9]. The importance of this is that it is used in the synthesis of UCL 1608 [371172-30-4], a medicine discovered by C. Robin Ganellin & Co.

=== Fluorene dyes ===
Fluorene dyes are well developed. Most are prepared by condensation of the active methylene group with carbonyls. 2-Aminofluorene, 3,6-bis(dimethylamino)fluorene, and 2,7-diiodofluorene are precursors to dyes.

== See also ==
- CataCXium F sulf
- Fluorenol
- Fluorenylidene
- Indecainide
- PD-137889
- Carbazole
- Dibenzothiophene
