= (Z)-Stilbene =

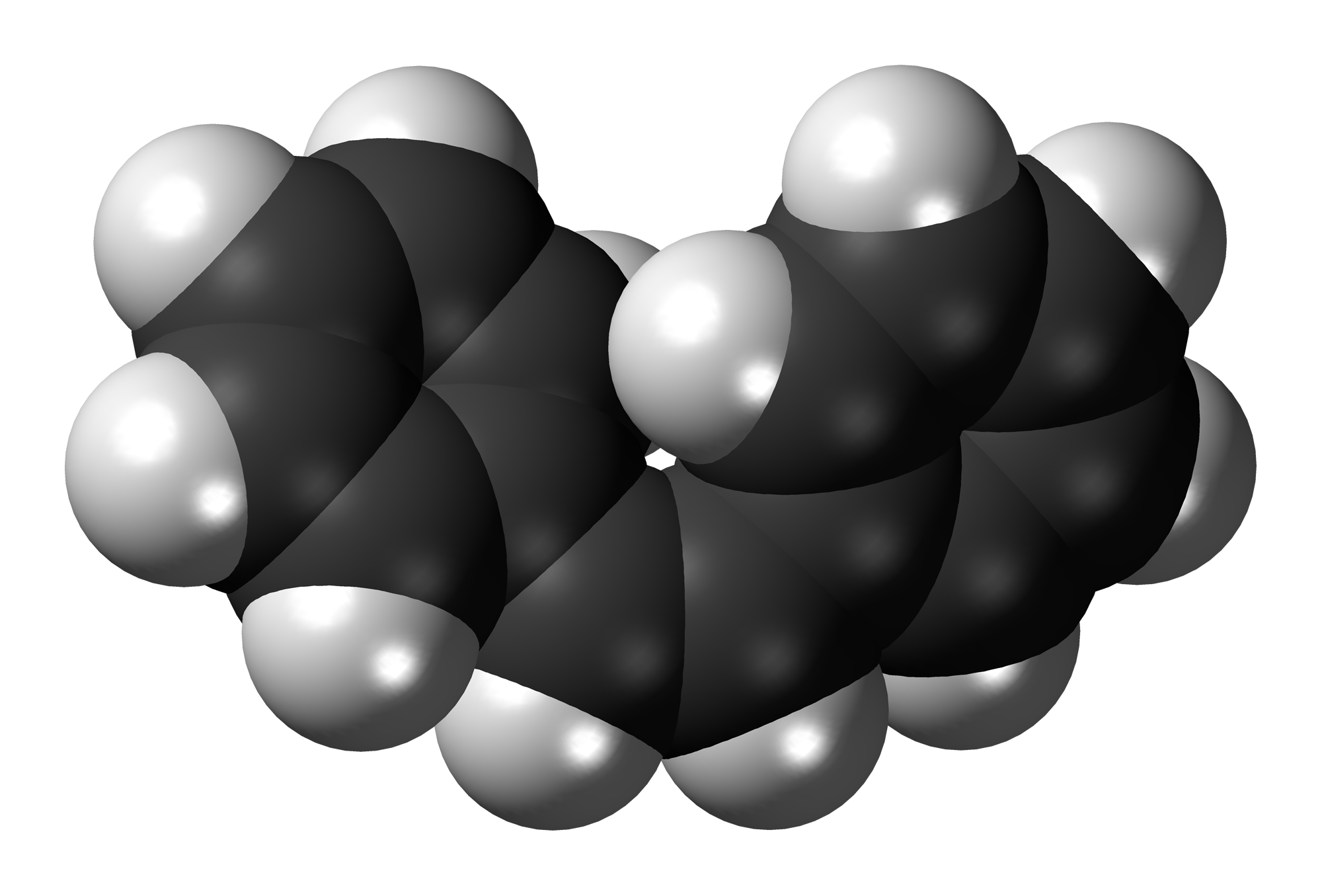
- C=black, H=white

Names
- IUPAC name cis-1,2-Diphenylethylene
- Preferred IUPAC name (Z)-1,2-Diphenylethene
- Other names cis-Stilbene

Identifiers
CAS Number	645-49-8
3D model (JSmol)	Interactive image
Beilstein Reference	1616739
ChEBI	CHEBI:36008
ChEMBL	ChEMBL393702
ChemSpider	4512351
ECHA InfoCard	100.010.406
EC Number	211-445-7
Gmelin Reference	4380
PubChem CID	5356785
UNII	TTG5048Y3K
CompTox Dashboard (EPA)	DTXSID5026049
- InChI: InChI=1S/C14H12/c1-3-7-13(8-4-1)11-12-14-9-5-2-6-10-14/h1-12H/b12-11- Key: PJANXHGTPQOBST-QXMHVHEDSA-N; InChI=1/C14H12/c1-3-7-13(8-4-1)11-12-14-9-5-2-6-10-14/h1-12H/b12-11- Key: PJANXHGTPQOBST-QXMHVHEDBW
- SMILES: c2(\C=C/c1ccccc1)ccccc2

Properties
Chemical formula	C_{14}H_{12}
Molar mass	180.250 g·mol^{−1}
Appearance	Liquid
Melting point	5 to 6 °C (41 to 43 °F; 278 to 279 K)
Boiling point	307 °C (585 °F; 580 K) at 1 atm (82°C to 84°C at 0.4 mmHg)
Solubility in water	Practically insoluble

Hazards
- GHS labelling
Pictograms	(GHS07: Exclamation mark)
Signal word	Warning
Hazard statements	H315, H319
Precautionary statements	P264, P280, P302+P352, P305+P351+P338, P321, P332+P313, P337+P313, P362
Safety data sheet (SDS)	Oxford MSDS
- Except where otherwise noted, data are given for materials in their standard state (at 25 °C [77 °F], 100 kPa). verify (what is ?) Infobox references

(Z)-Stilbene is a diarylethene, that is, a hydrocarbon consisting of a cis ethene double bond substituted with a phenyl group on both carbon atoms of the double bond. The name stilbene was derived from the Greek word stilbos, which means shining.

== Isomers ==
Stilbene exists as two possible isomers known as (E)-stilbene and (Z)-stilbene. (Z)-Stilbene is sterically hindered and less stable because the steric interactions force the aromatic rings 43° out-of-plane and prevent conjugation. (Z)-Stilbene has a melting point of 5–6 °C (41–43 °F), while (E)-stilbene melts around 125 °C (257 °F), illustrating that the two compounds are quite different.

== Uses ==
- Stilbene is used in manufacture of dyes and optical brighteners, and also as a phosphor and a scintillator.
- Stilbene is one of the gain mediums used in dye lasers.

== Properties ==
- Stilbene will typically have the chemistry of a diarylethene, a conjugated alkene.
- Stilbene can undergo photoisomerization under the influence of UV light.
- Stilbene can undergo stilbene photocyclization, an intramolecular reaction.
- (Z)-Stilbene can undergo electrocyclic reactions.
- In strong (protic) acid, cis-stilbene oligomerizes to a phenylmethylene chain capped by diphenylindane groups. The analogous trans compound doees not so react.

== Natural occurrence ==
Many stilbene derivatives (stilbenoids) are present naturally in plants. An example is resveratrol and its cousin, pterostilbene.
