= J-aggregate =

Type of dye

1,1'-diethyl-2,2'-cyanine chloride (pseudoisocyanine chloride, PIC chloride)

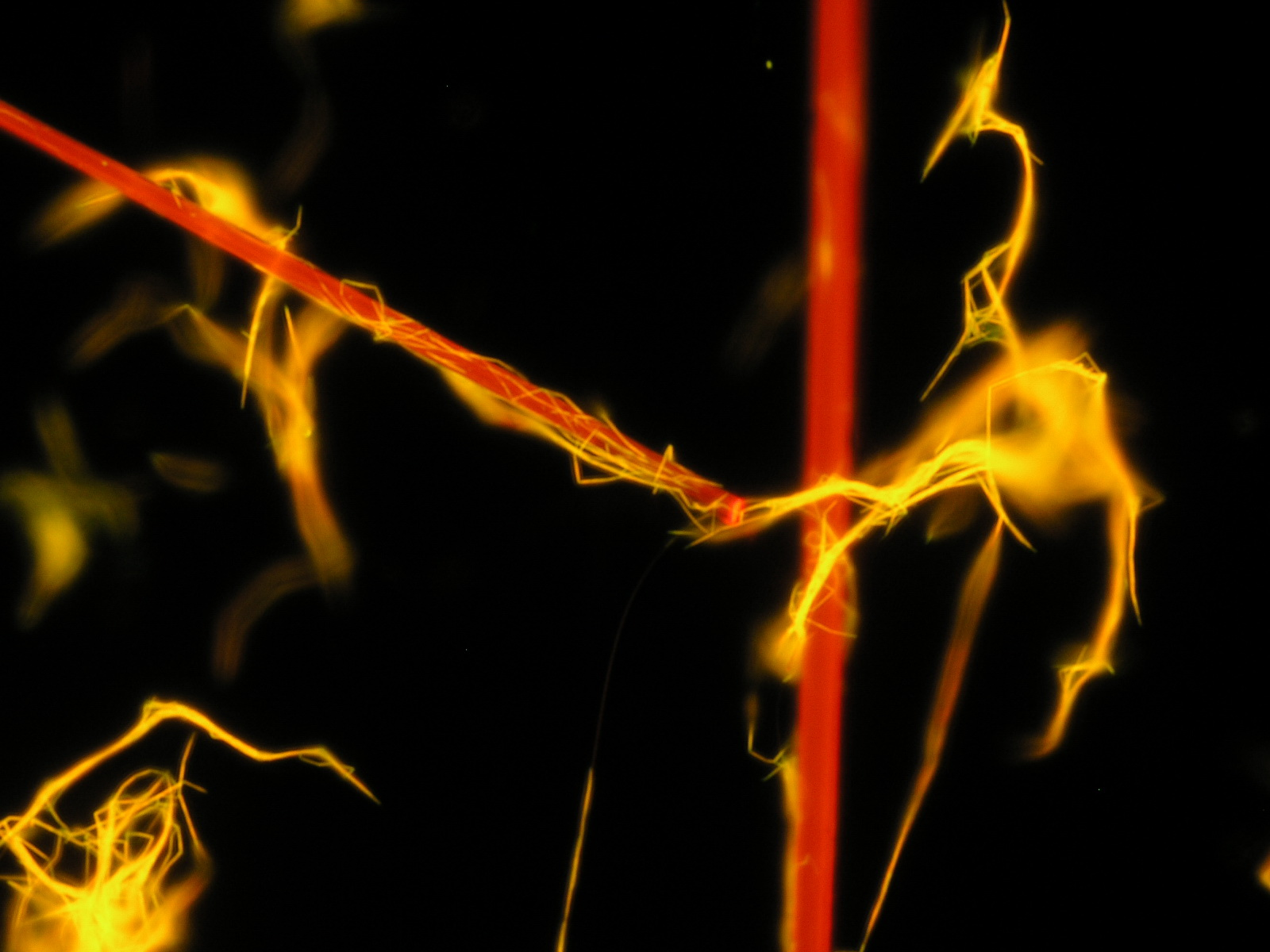
Fiber-like J-aggregates (yellow) and light-guiding microcrystallites (red)

A J-aggregate is a type of dye with an absorption band that shifts to a longer wavelength (bathochromic shift) of increasing sharpness (higher absorption coefficient) when it aggregates under the influence of a solvent or additive or concentration as a result of supramolecular self-organisation. The dye can be characterized further by a small Stokes shift with a narrow band. The J in J-aggregate refers to E.E. Jelley who discovered the phenomenon in 1936. The dye is also called a Scheibe aggregate after G. Scheibe who also independently published on this topic in 1937.

Scheibe and Jelley independently observed that in ethanol the dye PIC chloride has two broad absorption maxima at around 19,000 cm^{−1} and 20,500 cm^{−1} (526 and 488 nm respectively) and that in water a third sharp absorption maximum appears at 17,500 cm^{−1} (571 nm). The intensity of this band further increases on increasing concentration and on adding sodium chloride. In the oldest aggregation model for PIC chloride the individual molecules are stacked like a roll of coins forming a supramolecular polymer but the true nature of this aggregation phenomenon is still under investigation. Analysis is complicated because PIC chloride is not a planar molecule. The molecular axis can tilt in the stack creating a helix pattern. In other models the dye molecules orient themselves in a brickwork, ladder, or staircase fashion. In various experiments the J-band was found to split as a function of temperature, liquid crystal phases were found with concentrated solutions and CryoTEM revealed aggregate rods 350 nm long and 2.3 nm in diameter.

J-aggregate dyes are found with polymethine dyes in general, with cyanines, merocyanines, squaraine and perylene bisimides. Certain π-conjugated macrocycles, reported by Swager and co-workers at MIT, were also found to form J-aggregates and exhibited exceptionally high photoluminescence quantum yields. In 2020, a famous cyanine dye (TDBC) was reported with enhanced photoluminescence quantum yield (> 50%) in the solution at room-temperature.

Molecular PIC aggregates exhibiting J-like properties have been shown to spontaneously template into sequence specific DNA duplex strands. These DNA based J-aggregates, known as J-bits, have been sought after as a bottom-up method of self-assembling PIC J-aggregates into large scale multi-functional DNA scaffolds. Critically, J-bits have been observed to engage in energy transfer when in proximity to quantum dots as well as organic dyes such as Alexa Fluor dyes. Prototypical DNA energy transfer arrays, which are based on the molecular photonic wire design, use FRET to transfer excitons step-wise down an energy gradient. Since the FRET efficiency between two Fluorophores decays by their separation distance to the 6th power, the spatial limitations of these systems are highly constrained. It is hypothesized that integrating J-bit relays between FRET nodes would allow some of this energy loss to be recouped. In theory, dense packing and rigid alignment of the PIC monomers enables superposition of the transition dipoles allowing excitons to propagate through the length of the aggregate with low loss.

== Kasha's framework ==
In the 1950s, Kasha had developed a framework to bridge the excitonic shifts in optoelectronic spectra of molecular aggregates of chromophores (monomers) to the aggregate underlying structure. In this framework, the transitional dipoles are aligned in a "head-to-tail" fashion, with the excitonic states of all dipoles oscillating in the same phase (wavevector k = 0) is lowered in energy compared to the monomers. This shift from higher energy in the monomer stage to the lower energy of the aggregate leads to a red shift (bathochromic shift). In 1D excitonic systems these aggregates with head-to-tail arrangements are called J-aggregates. This k = 0 is called "bright state" as it has the highest probability of transition according to fermi's golden rule. There is another type of aggregate, where the co-facial (face-to-face or π-π stacking) arrangement is adopted called H-aggregates. These aggregates lead to blue shifting (hypsochromic shift) as the bright state of these aggregates are higher in energy than its monomers. These types of aggregates are found more often in flat and conjugated systems such as perylenes, porphyrins, etc.

== See also ==
- H-aggregates, in which a hypsochromic shift is observed with low or no fluorescence.
