= Merocyanine =

Merocyanine I
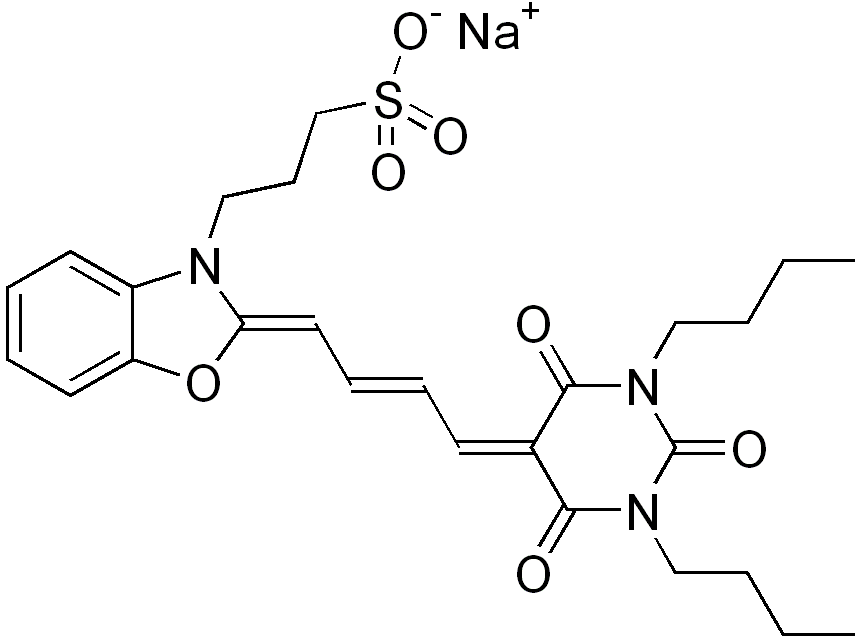

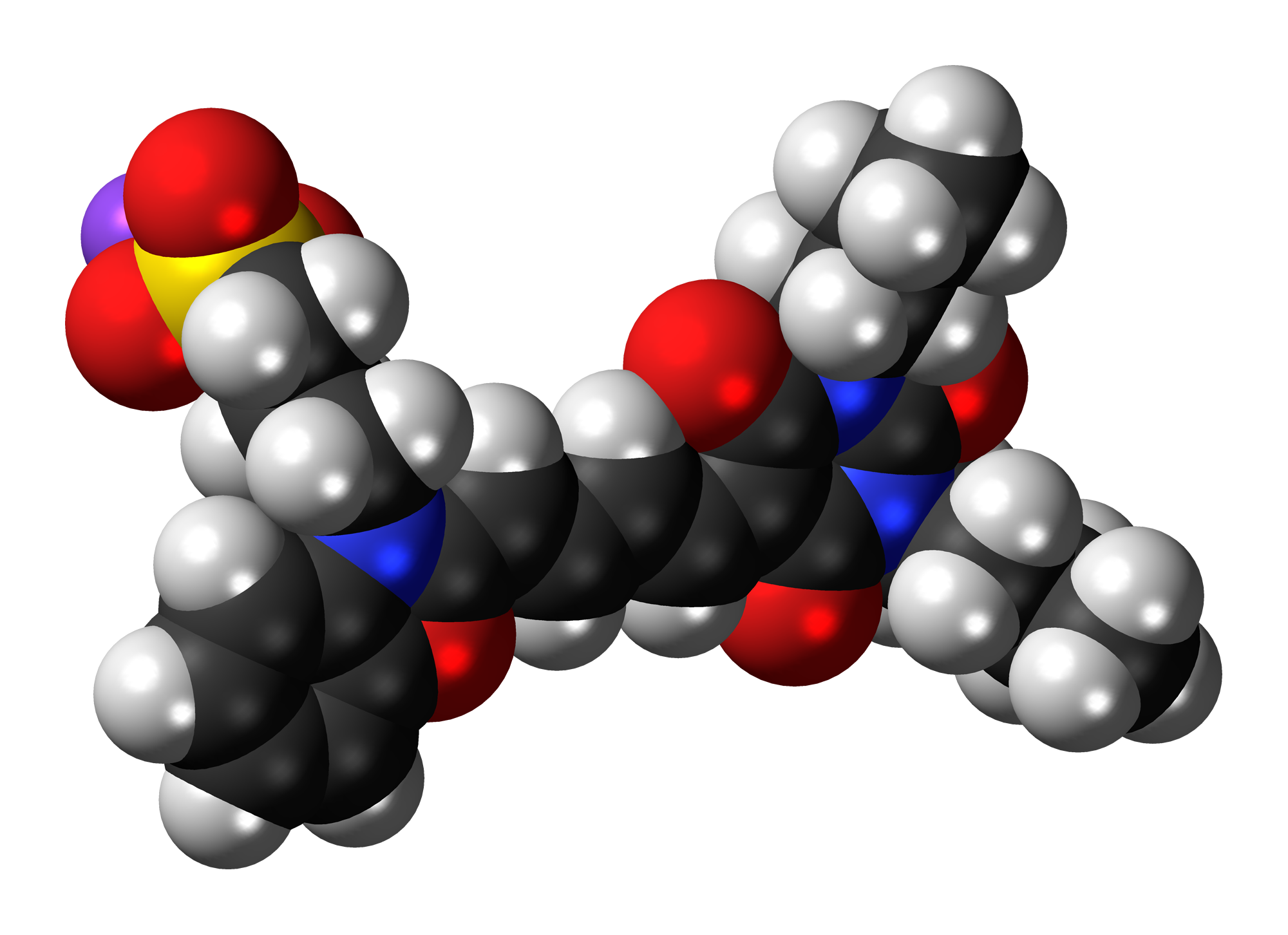

Names
- Preferred IUPAC name Sodium 3-{(2Z)-2-[(2E)-4-(1,3-dibutyl-2,4,6-trioxo-1,3-diazinan-5-ylidene)but-2-en-1-ylidene]-1,3-benzoxazol-3(2H)-yl}propane-1-sulfonate

Identifiers
CAS Number	58823-12-4
3D model (JSmol)	Interactive image
ChemSpider	4941661
PubChem CID	23678802
UNII	7V7WD5EDT7
- InChI: InChI=1S/C26H33N3O7S.Na/c1-3-5-16-28-24(30)20(25(31)29(26(28)32)17-6-4-2)12-7-10-15-23-27(18-11-19-37(33,34)35)21-13-8-9-14-22(21)36-23;/h7-10,12-15H,3-6,11,16-19H2,1-2H3,(H,33,34,35);/q;+1/p-1/b10-7+,23-15-; Key: DZVCFNFOPIZQKX-LTHRDKTGSA-M
- SMILES: CCCCN1C(=O)C(=C/C=C/C=C\2/N(c3ccccc3O2)CCCS(=O)(=O)[O-])C(=O)N(C1=O)CCCC.[Na+]

Properties
Chemical formula	C_{26}H_{32}N_{3}NaO_{7}S
Molar mass	553.60 g/mol
- Except where otherwise noted, data are given for materials in their standard state (at 25 °C [77 °F], 100 kPa). verify (what is ?) Infobox references

Merocyanines are a class of polymethine dyes. Prototypical members feature a conjugated hydrocarbon chain terminated by a heterocyclic amine or pyridine and by an aldehyde. They are structurally related to cyanine dyes with two aza rings as termini, hemicyanine dyes with one aza-heterocyclic and one acyclic aza termini, and streptocyanine dyes with two N termini, neither heterocyclic. Also related are quinophthalones and spiropyrans. Like other dyes, merocyanines are intensely colored, but sets them apart is their solvatochromism. They have attracted much attention for potential applications in optoelectronics. Like ionic cyanines, merocyanines contain two terminal heteroatoms and a polymethine chain in their chromophores.

Merocyanines are also of interest in the laboratory. Merocyanine 540 was the first fluorescent dye used for measuring membrane potential, while Brooker's merocyanine and related compounds are notable for their solvatochromatic properties.

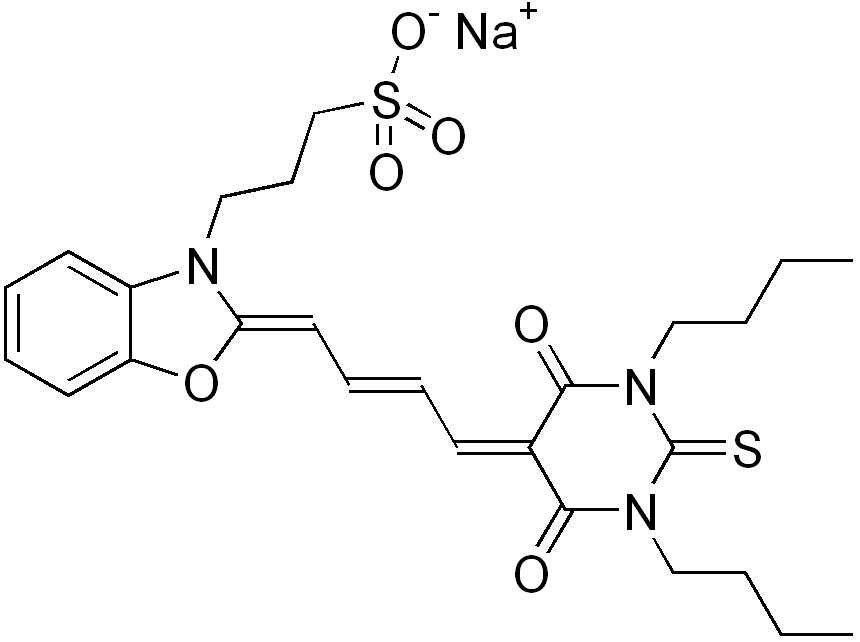
Merocyanine 540 differs from merocyanine I by the replacement of an oxygen atom with a sulfur atom

== See also ==
- Cyanine
- J-aggregate
- Zeromethine
- Dimethinemerocyanines
- Zeromethinemerocyanines
