= Orthochromasia =

Property of chemical dyeing or staining

In chemistry, orthochromasia is the property of a dye or stain that does not change color when binding to a target, as opposed to metachromatic stains, which do change color. The word is derived from the Greek orthos (correct, upright), and chromatic (color). Toluidine blue is an example of a partially orthochromatic dye, as it stains nucleic acids by its orthochromatic color (blue), but stains mast cell granules in its metachromatic color (red).

In spectral terms, orthochromasia refers to maintaining the position of spectral peaks, while metachromasia refers to a shift in wavelength, becoming either shorter or longer.

In photography, an orthochromatic light spectrum is one devoid of red light.

== Orthochromatic photography ==
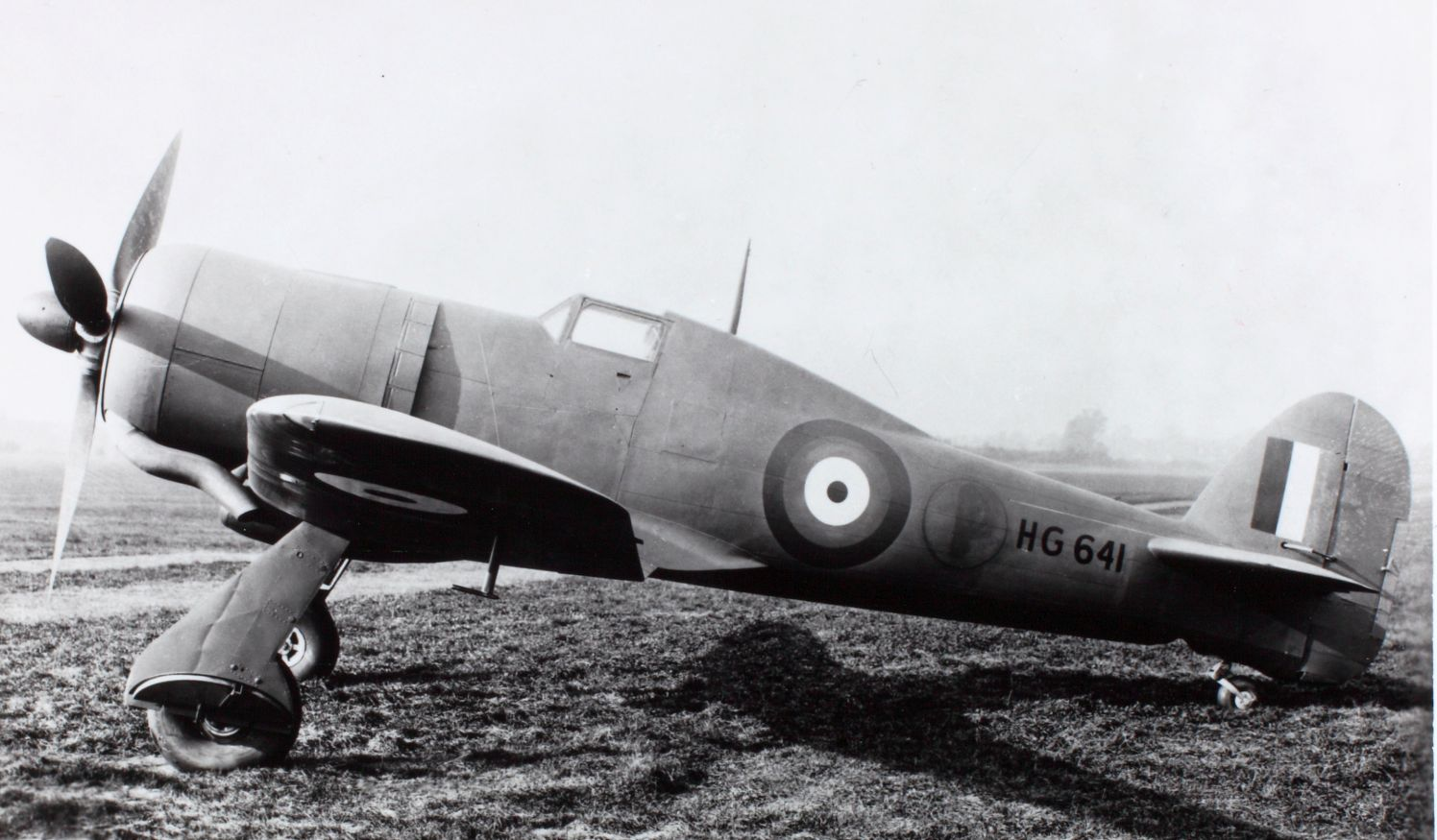
This WW II British Hawker Tornado prototype's 'Type A.1' RAF roundel's outermost, chrome yellow ring appears as dark gray, due to orthochromasia.

Color drawing of 'Type A.1' RAF roundel, for comparison

Orthochromatic photography refers to a photographic emulsion that is sensitive to blue and green light but not red light. This type of emulsion was a significant advancement in early photography, as it allowed for the production of images with more accurate tonal reproduction than the earlier emulsions that were sensitive only to blue (and ultraviolet) light, e.g., the wet plate collodion emulsions.

The development of orthochromatic films can be traced back to the work of Hermann Wilhelm Vogel in 1873. Vogel experimented with adding small amounts of certain aniline-based dyes to photographic emulsions to extend their sensitivity beyond blue light. This breakthrough allowed for the production of emulsions that could capture a broader spectrum of colors and tones including Josef Maria Eder, who introduced the use of the red dye erythrosine in 1884.

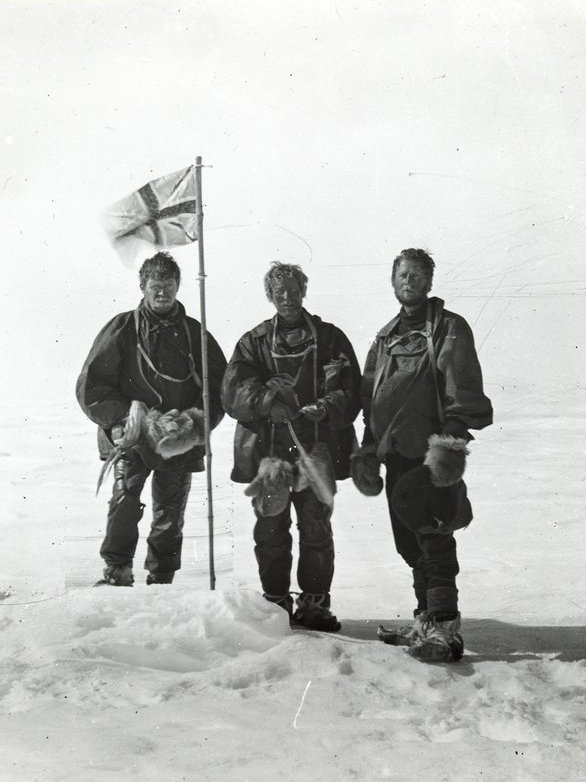
The Union Jack on orthochromatic emulsion at the South Magnetic Pole in 1909.

In addition to their use in still photography, orthochromatic films also played a significant role in the early days of motion pictures. The improved tonal range provided by orthochromatic emulsions allowed filmmakers to create more visually compelling and realistic moving images.

Because orthochromatic emulsions are not sensitive to red light, they can be processed with a red safelight.

=== Relative to panchromasia ===
ColorChecker chart, for comparison

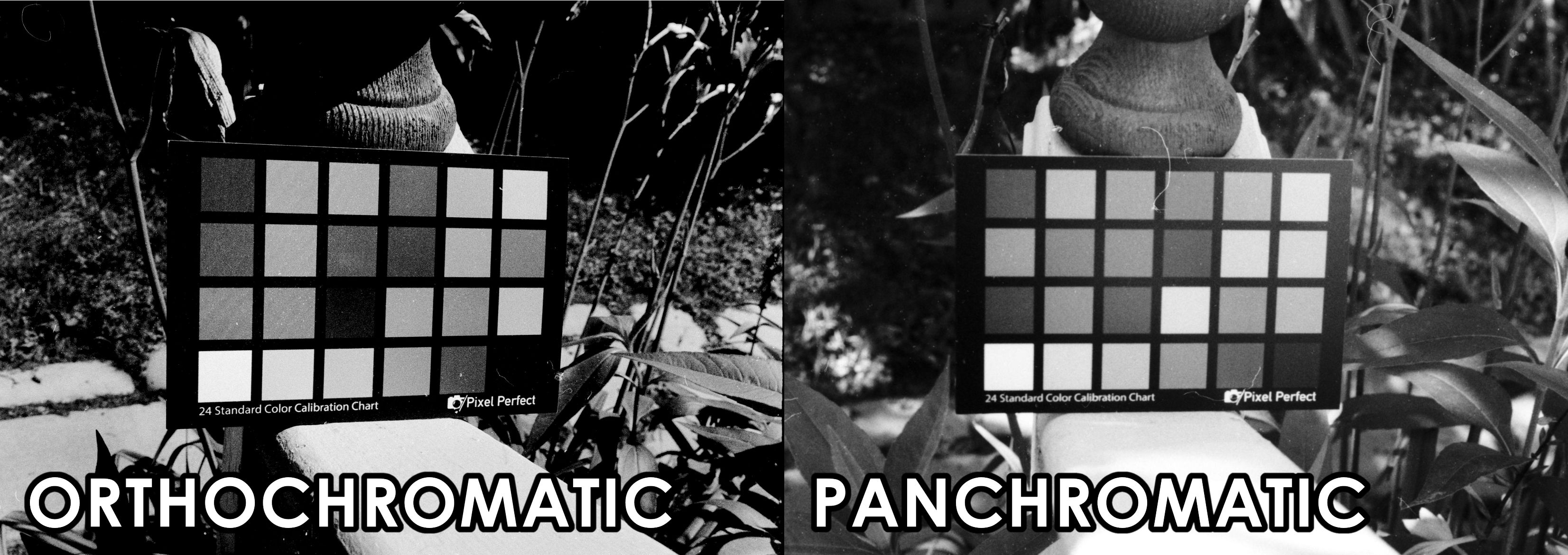
Reproduction on orthochromatic (left) and panchromatic (right) film.

Most modern black-and-white films are panchromatic, which add sensitivity to red light, unlike orthochromatic emulsions, which are sensitive to only blue and green. Panchromatic films have a reduced sensitivity to blue light, compared to orthochromatic films.

The increased blue sensitivity of orthochromatic photography causes blue objects to appear lighter, and red ones darker than panchromatic emulsions. A cyan photographic filter, which blocks red light but allows blue and green to pass, can be used with standard panchromatic film to produce a similar effect. This technique allowed photographers to manipulate the tonal range of their images without relying on specialized orthochromatic films.

Despite the advancements in photographic technology that have occurred since the introduction of orthochromatic films, they continue to be appreciated by some photographers for their unique tonal qualities and artistic potential.

== See also ==
- Panchromatic
