= Polymethine dyes =

Type of dye

Methine dyes (polymethine dyes) are dyes whose chromophoric system consists of an odd number of CH units flanked by two end groups: an electron acceptor A and an electron donor D (however, A and D can be identical; in such a case the dye is said to be symmetrical).

Structures of methine dyes

In contrast to methine dyes, classical polyenes such as carotene have alternating C=C and C-C bonds. The end groups of polymethines can also be part of a heterocycle or the double bonds part of an aromatic system: The methine dye subclasses are based on these structural differences. Methine dyes can furthermore be classified as cationic, anionic or neutral.

If one or more methine groups are replaced by a heteroatom - usually nitrogen - one speaks of heteroanalogous (aza-analogous) methine dyes.

== Optical properties ==
The absorption maximum of polymethines shifts by as much as 100 nm towards lower energgy for each additional HC=CH unit. In contrast, the absorption maximum of polyenes shifts less with each added C=C and converges toward a limiting value. Some polymethines reach the "cyanine limit" whereby bond lengths along the chain become equalized, intermediate between single and double bonds. Very long cyanines, such as the heptamethines lose symmetry and become localized.

== General properties and classification ==
Methine dyes are polymethines with terminal electron-donating and electron-accepting groups In the majority of cases, these terminal groups contain nitrogen or oxygen atoms. However, while the naturally occurring polyene dyes (such as carotenoids) are limited to yellow, orange and red tones, almost all colours of the spectrum can be achieved with the predominantly synthetic methine dyes.

- Monomethine dyes have two rings linked by a -CH= group
- Trimethine dyes have two rings linked by a -CH=CH-CH= group
- Pentamethine dyes have two rings linked by a -CH=CH-CH=CH-CH= group

Implicit to this nomenclature are the zeromethine dyes, where the push-pull components are directly linked.

=== Cyanine dyes ===
C.I. Basic Red 12 is an example of a cyanine dye.

The best known methine dyes are the cationic cyanine dyes. Both terminal groups contain nitrogen, and both nitrogen atoms are part of heterocycles. Depending on chain length they are classed as mono-, tri-, penta- or heptamethine cyanines; familiar examples are Cy3 (trimethine), Cy5 (pentamethine) and indocyanine green (heptamethine). Historically their main application was the spectral sensitization of photographic emulsions.

General structure of cyanine dyes

=== Hemicyanine dyes ===
C.I. Basic Yellow 11 is a commercial hemicyanine dye.

In the case of hemicyanine dyes, one terminal amino group is part of a heterocycle, while the second terminal group is open-chain.

General structure of hemicyanine dyes

=== Streptocyanine dyes ===
If both terminal amino and imino groups of the chromophore are open chain, one speaks of streptocyanine dyes.

General structure of streptocyanine dyes

=== Merocyanine dyes ===
Merocyanine dyes have an amino and a carbonyl group as end groups of the polymethine structural element. The amino group is part of a heterocycle. Both a neutral and a zwitterionic resonance structure can be described for this compound type. Their most distinctive property is solvatochromism. Merocyanines including spiropyrans and quinophthalones.

=== Neutrocyanines dyes ===
R_{2}N^{+}=CH[CH=CH]_{n}-CN and R_{2}N^{+}=CH[CH=CH]_{n}-CHO

=== Oxonol dyes ===
Oxonol Blue

Oxonols are the anionic counterparts of the cyanines; both terminal groups contain oxygen. The are of interest in colour photography and the following of enzymatic reactions via the use of barbituric and thiobarbituric terminal groups.

General structure of oxonol dyes

=== Styryl dyes ===
Styryl dyes are obtained by condensing an active methylene compound (e.g. malononitrile) with a benzaldehyde derivative. By integrating a benzene ring into the polymethine segment, these compounds have a styrene partial structure. Styryl dyes are used as disperse dyes for polyester fibers.

Example: Preparation of C.I. Disperse Yellow 31 (3) by condensation of ethyl cyanoacetate (1) with a p-aminobenzaldehyde derivative.

Synthesis of C.I. Disperse Yellow 31 (3)

=== Di- and triarylmethine dyes ===
Also amino- and hydroxy-substituted di- and triarylmethines comprise the structural element of a methine dye:

Triarylmethine dyes, resonance structure (R=H, alkyl)

Triarylmethine dyes are derived from triphenylmethane, in which at least two of the aromatic rings have electron-donating substituents (e.g. amino groups, secondary and tertiary alkylamino groups or hydroxy groups). They are therefore also referred to in older literature as triarylmethane dyes. For the dyes, resonance structure can be described as a carbenium ion or with an iminocyclohexadiene or cyclohexadienone partial structure. The central carbon atom in these dyes is therefore not sp^{3}- but sp^{2}-hybridized.

Triarylmethine dyes usually show intensive, luminous colourings with poor light fastness. In addition to dyeing and printing textiles, leather and paper, they are also used for printing inks, inks, ballpoint pen pastes and as microscopic dyes. As functional dyes, some representatives of this dye class are used as indicators (phenolphthalein), as disinfectants, anthelmintics and antifungals (e.g. malachite green, crystal violet).

Examples:

Michlers Hydrol, a colorless dye precursor

C.I. Solvent Yellow 34

Phenolphthalein (pH 8.2-12)

[[Fuchsin| C.I. Basic Violet 14 (fuchsine)]]

C.I. Basic Green 4 also known as malachite green)

C.I. Basic Violet 3 (also known as crystal violet)

== Aza-analog methine dyes ==
If a methine group in a methine dye is replaced by a nitrogen atom, a azamethine dye is obtained (example: C.I. Basic Yellow 28). Accordingly, diazamethine dyes are obtained by replacing two methine groups with nitrogen atoms. Diazahemicyanine dyes (examples: C.I. Basic Red 22 and C.I. Basic Blue 41) in particular are an important class of methine dyes and are used as cationic dyes in the dyeing of polyacrylonitrile fibers.

Examples:

C.I. Basic Yellow 28

C.I. Basic Red 22

C.I. Basic Blue 41

The quinonimine dyes are aza-analogous members of the diarylmethine dyes:

General structure of quinonimine dyes where X = OH, NH_{2} or NR_{2} Y = O or NH
