= Reichardt's dye =

Names
- Preferred IUPAC name 2^{5}-(2,4,6-Triphenylpyridin-1-ium-1-yl)[1^{1},2^{1}:2^{3},3^{1}-terphenyl]-2^{2}-olate

Identifiers
CAS Number	10081-39-7
3D model (JSmol)	Interactive image
ChemSpider	2035342
PubChem CID	2754438
UNII	NN977V8PG5
CompTox Dashboard (EPA)	DTXSID60373025
- InChI: InChI=1S/C41H29NO/c43-41-37(31-18-8-2-9-19-31)28-36(29-38(41)32-20-10-3-11-21-32)42-39(33-22-12-4-13-23-33)26-35(30-16-6-1-7-17-30)27-40(42)34-24-14-5-15-25-34/h1-29H Key: UWOVWIIOKHRNKU-UHFFFAOYSA-N
- SMILES: C1=CC=C(C=C1)C2=CC(=[N+](C(=C2)C3=CC=CC=C3)C4=CC(=C(C(=C4)C5=CC=CC=C5)[O-])C6=CC=CC=C6)C7=CC=CC=C7

Properties
Chemical formula	C_{41}H_{29}NO
Molar mass	551.689 g·mol^{−1}
- Except where otherwise noted, data are given for materials in their standard state (at 25 °C [77 °F], 100 kPa). Infobox references

Reichardt's dye (Betaine 30) is an organic dye belonging to the class of azomerocyanine betaines. This dye is notable for its solvatochromic properties, meaning it changes color depending on the solvent in which it is dissolved. It has one of the largest solvatochromic effects ever observed, with color varying across the entire visible spectrum. As a result, it is often used for demonstrations of solvent polarity, due to its striking visual results.

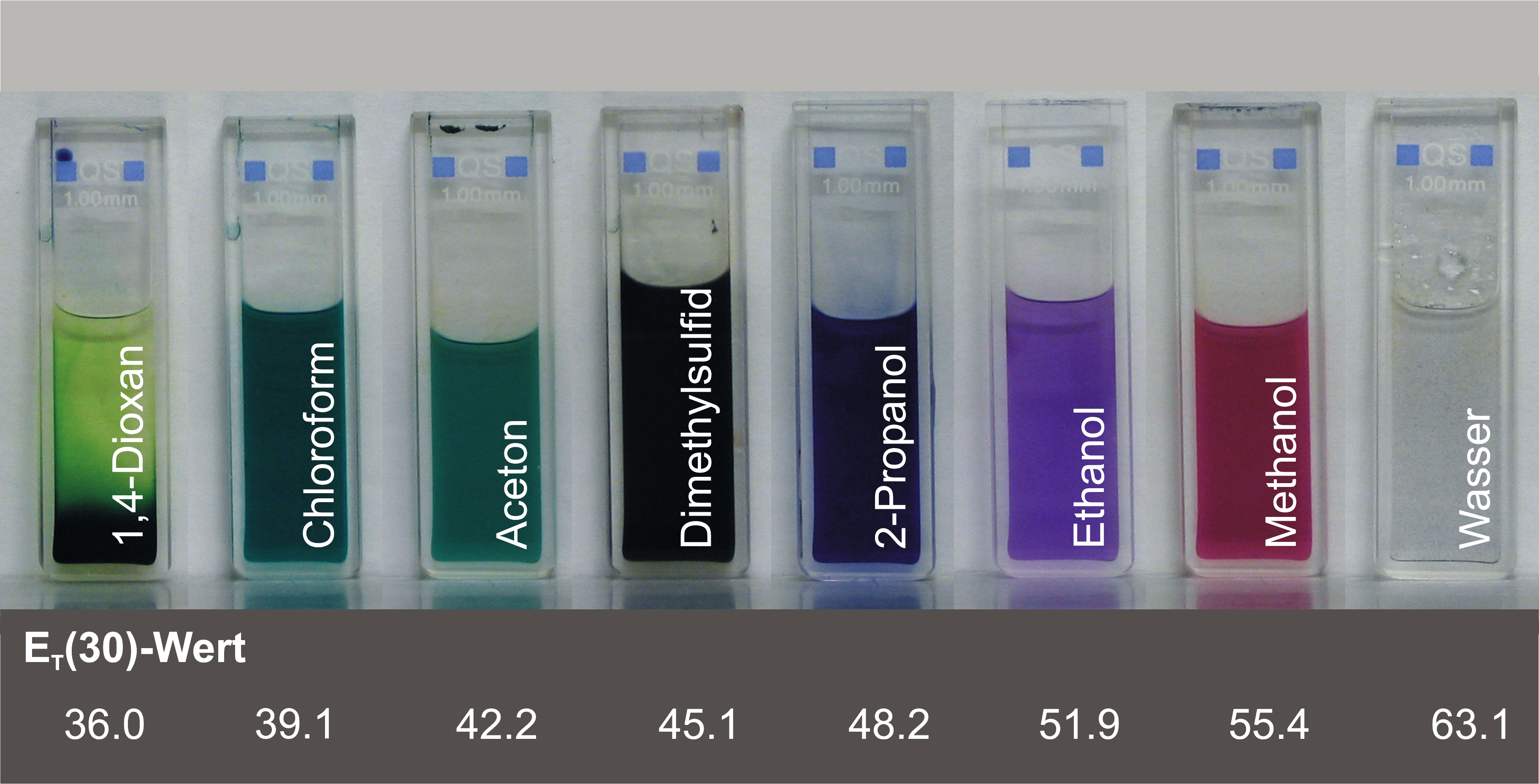
Reichardt's dye as seen in various solutions, in order of increasing polarity from left to right.

This chemical is named for Christian Reichardt, who developed it when working as a doctoral student in the lab of Karl Dimroth. It is thus also sometimes called Dimroth–Reichardt dye. The names also sometimes refer to some close chemical analogs, in particular, the one having para substituted tert-butyl groups on the phenyl rings.

== Synthesis ==
A newer synthesis is:

2,6-Diphenylphenol is nitrated with diluted nitric acid to 4-nitro-2,6-diphenylphenol and subsequently reduced with sodium dithionite to the amine. This is reacted in presence of sodium acetate in ethanol with 2,4,6-triphenylpyryliumhydrogensulfate to the hydrogen sulfate of the dye and the betaine is formed by adding sodium hydroxide.
