= Spiropyran =

Photochromic organic chemical compound

A spiropyran is a type of photochromic organic chemical compound, characterized by their ability to reversibly switch between two structural forms—spiropyran and merocyanine—upon exposure to light or other external stimuli. This reversible transformation alters their optical and electronic properties, making them valuable in various applications, including molecular switches, optical data storage, sensors, and smart materials.

== History ==
Spiropyrans were discovered in the early twentieth century, but it was not until 1952 that their photochromic properties were formally documented by chemists Fischer and Gerhard Hirshberg. Their pioneering work demonstrated that spiropyrans undergo reversible structural and color changes when exposed to ultraviolet light, a phenomenon that sparked widespread interest in photoresponsive organic compounds. Throughout the latter half of the twentieth century, advancements in synthetic methods enabled the development of a wide range of spiropyran derivatives with enhanced stability and responsiveness. By the 1990s and 2000s, the integration of spiropyrans into polymers, nanomaterials, and biological systems had established them as key components in emerging technologies such as molecular electronics, smart coatings, and environmental sensors. Today, spiropyrans continue to be actively investigated for their potential in dynamic and multifunctional materials.

== Synthesis ==
There are two methods for the production of spiropyrans. The first one can be by condensation of methylene bases with o-hydroxy aromatic aldehydes (or the condensation of the precursor of methylene bases). Spiropyrans generally could be obtained by boiling the aldehyde and the respective benzazolium salts in presence of pyridine or piperidine:

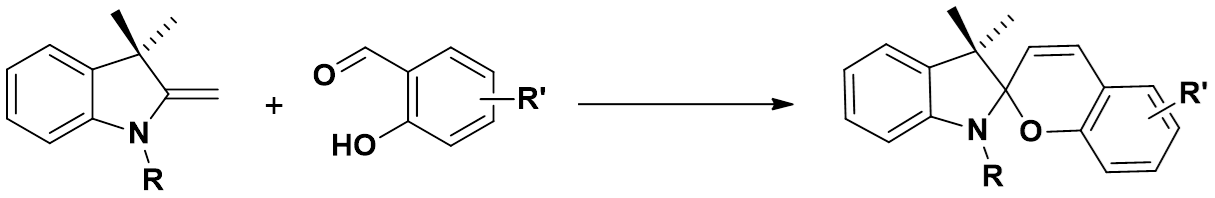
Figure 1: Formation of spiropyran from fundamental building blocks.

A second route involves condensation of o-hydroxy aromatic aldehydes with the salts of heterocyclic cations which contains active methylene groups and isolation of the intermediate styryl salts. This second procedure is followed by the removal of the elements of the acid from the obtained styryl salt, such as perchloric acid, with organic bases (gaseous ammonia or amines).

== Structure ==
A spiropyran is a 2H-pyran isomer that has the hydrogen atom at position two replaced by a second ring system linked to the carbon atom at position two of the pyran molecule in a spiro way. So there is a carbon atom which is common on both rings, the pyran ring and the replaced ring. The second ring, the replaced one, is usually heterocyclic but there are exceptions.

A solution of the spiropyran in polar solvents upon heating (thermochromism) or radiation (photochromism) becomes coloured owing to formation of the merocyanine isomer. The structural differences between spiropyran and merocyanine form is that, while in the first one the ring is in the closed form, in the other one the ring is opened. The photochromism arises from electrocyclic cleavage of the C-spiro-O bond.

== Photochromism ==
Photochromism is the phenomenon that produces a change of colour in a substance by incident radiation. In other words, Photochromism is a light-induced change of colour of a chemical substance. The spiropyrans are one of the photochromatic molecules that have raised more interest lately. These molecules consist of two heterocyclic functional groups in orthogonal planes bound by a carbon atom. Spiropyrans are one of the oldest families of photochromism. As solids, the spiropyrans do not present photochromism. It is possible in solution and in the dry state that radiation between 250 nm and 380 nm (approximately) is able to, by breaking the C-O binding, transform the spiropyrans into its colour emitting merocyanine form. The structure of the colourless molecules, the substrate of the reaction (N), is more thermodynamically stable than the product – depending on the solvent in which it is stored. For example, in NMP the equilibrium could be switched more toward the merocyanin form (solvatochromic effects). The photoisomers of the spiropyrans have a structure similar to cyanines, even though it is not symmetric about the center of the polymethine chain, and it is classified as a merocyanine (Figure 2).

Figure 2: Spiropyran (1) to merocyanine (2)

Once the irradiation has stopped, the merocyanine in solution starts to discolour and to revert to its original form, the spiropyran (SP). Procedure:

- Irradiation of spiropyrans in solution with UV light of wavelength 250–380 nm breaks C-O bonds.
- Consequently, the structure of the initial molecule changes, the resulting one being merocyanine (MC). Because of the apparent conjugated system after UV illumination the extinction coefficient of the MC-form is significantly higher than that of the closed spiropyran form (SP).
- Unlike the initial solution, the product of the photochromism reaction is not colorless.
- Depending on substituent on the aromatic system the switching behavior of the derivatives can change in their switching velocity and photo-fatigue resistance.

== Applications ==
Spiropyrans are widely studied for their photochromic properties, which enable reversible transformations between structurally distinct forms in response to external stimuli such as light, heat, pH, or metal ions. This unique behavior has led to their application in a diverse range of fields.

In materials science, spiropyrans are incorporated into smart materials and coatings that respond dynamically to environmental changes, offering potential for use in sensors, actuators, and light-responsive surfaces.

In electronics, they serve as molecular switches and components in optical data storage systems due to their reversible and controllable optical properties.

Spiropyrans also play a significant role in biomedical research, particularly in the development of light-activated drug delivery systems and biosensors.

The versatility and tunability of spiropyran derivatives continue to drive research into their integration in emerging technologies across chemistry, physics, and engineering disciplines.

Some more detailed examples of the applications of spiropyrans are listed below:

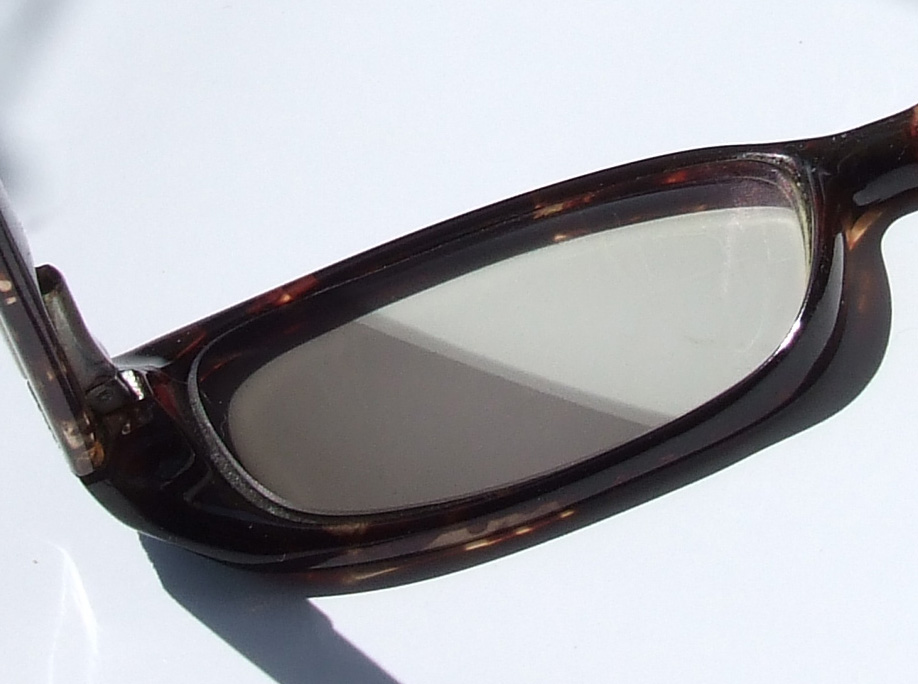
Figure 3: A photochromic lens where the left side (darkened) is irradiated with UV light, and the right side (clear) is irradiated with visible light.

- Some photochromic compounds based on spiropyrans, spirooxazines, and [2H]chromenes were developed as silver-free light-sensitive materials that could be used for self-darkening glasses as seen in Figure 3, optical recording data, including thin films, photoswitches (sensors that discern light of certain wavelength), light filters with modulated transmission and miniature hybrid multifunctional materials.
- The creation of novel media sensitive to IR radiation and the potential of spiropyrans for optical recording data has influenced the development of semiconductor lasers as an activating source of radiation.
- Spiropyrans with ion complexes and spiropyran copolymers which are part of powdered and film materials have been used too to record optical data and increase the length of time of its storage.
- Another group of spiropyrans which contain indoline or nitrogen heterocycles and the indolinospirothiapyrans found their application in film forms of photochromic materials using polyester resins. Those resins with a high refractive index were used to make photochromic lenses. Moreover, spiropyrans are being used in cosmetics.
- New types of modified spiropyrans polymers contained in photochromic compounds found their use in the creation of photoreceptors. The ones with rhodopsin as a compound are adopted to raise the level of the photosignal.
- Another collection of spiropyrans characterized for their sensitivity to UV radiation are detectors for the protection of organs, for the production of light filters with modulated transmission, or photochromic lenses.
- The determination of peroxidase activity and NO_{2} levels in the atmosphere are applications of carboxylated spiropyrans.
- Spiropyrans can be used to probe the conformational state of DNA, as certain derivatives can intercalate into DNA when in the open form.
- Spiropyrans are used in photo controlled transfer of amino acids across bilayers and membranes because of nucleophilic interaction between zwitterionic merocyanine and polar amino acids. Certain types of spiropyrans display ring opening upon recognition of an analyte, for example zinc ions.
- Today, spiropyrans are most used as molecular logic devices, photochromic and electrooptical devices, molecular and supramolecular logic switches, photoswitches and multifunctional artificial receptors.
