= Subi Jacob George =

Indian organic chemist

Prof. Subi Jacob George Associate Professor
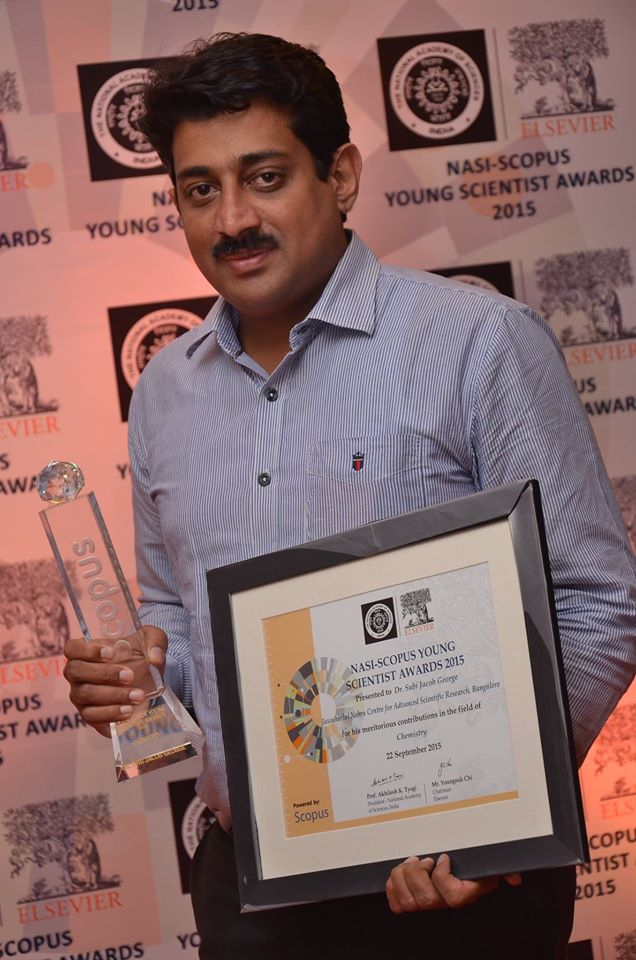
- Education: Mahatma Gandhi University, Kerala (B.Sc., M.Sc.); Cochin University of Science and Technology (Ph.D.)
- Spouse: Twintu Subi
- Children: 1
- Awards: Asian Scientist 100 2021; Shanti Swarup Bhatnagar Prize for Science and Technology 2020; Swarnajayanti Fellowship (2017), Scopus NASI Young Scientist Awards 2015, The APA Prize for Young Scientist 2015
- Scientific career
- Fields: Organic chemistry; Supramolecular chemistry
- Workplaces: Jawaharlal Nehru Centre for Advanced Scientific Research; Eindhoven University of Technology, Netherlands
- Thesis: [Thesis Oligo(p-phenylenevinylene) Derived Organogels: A Novel Class of Functional Supramolecular Materials] (2000-2004)
- Doctoral advisor: Ayyappanpillai Ajayaghosh
- Other academic advisors: Bert Meijer

Subi Jacob George (born in Kerala) is an Indian organic chemist known for his work in supramolecular chemistry, materials chemistry, and polymer chemistry. His research interests include organic and supramolecular synthesis, functional organic materials, supramolecular polymers, chiral amplification, hybrid materials, and optoelectronic materials.

== Education and career ==
He obtained a bachelor's degree in chemistry and a master's degree in organic chemistry from Mahatma Gandhi University, Kerala. In 2004, he was awarded a PhD in organic chemistry from the National Institute for Interdisciplinary Science and Technology, Trivandrum. He has been a professor at JNCASR since 2008.

== Awards ==
- 2015: APA Prize for Young Scientist
- 2015: Scopus NASI Young Scientist Awards
- 2017: Swarnajayanti Fellowship
- 2020: Shanti Swarup Bhatnagar Prize for Science and Technology
- 2021: Asian Scientist 100, Asian Scientist

== Selected publications ==
- Supramolecular Materials for Opto-Electronics.
- Emerging solvent-induced homochirality by the confinement of achiral molecules against a solid surface.
- Coiled-Coil Gel Nanostructures of Oligo(p-phenylenevinylene)s: Gelation-Induced Helix Transition in a Higher-Order Supramolecular Self-Assembly of a Rigid π-Conjugated System
- Helicity Induction and Amplification in an Oligo(p-phenylenevinylene) Assembly through Hydrogen-Bonded Chiral Acids.
- Oligo(p-phenylenevinylene) Derived Organogels: A Novel Class of Functional Supramolecular Materials

== See also ==
- Ayyappanpillai Ajayaghosh
- Bert Meijer
