= Supramolecular polymer =

Polymeric arrays of repeating units connected by non-covalent bonds

Supramolecular polymers are a subset of polymers where the monomeric units are connected by reversible and highly directional secondary interactions–that is, non-covalent bonds. These non-covalent interactions include van der Waals interactions, hydrogen bonding, Coulomb or ionic interactions, π-π stacking, metal coordination, halogen bonding, chalcogen bonding, and host–guest interaction. Their behavior can be described by the theories of polymer physics in dilute and concentrated solution, as well as in the bulk.

Additionally, some supramolecular polymers have distinctive characteristics, such as the ability to self-heal. Covalent polymers can be difficult to recycle, but supramolecular polymers may address this problem.

== History ==
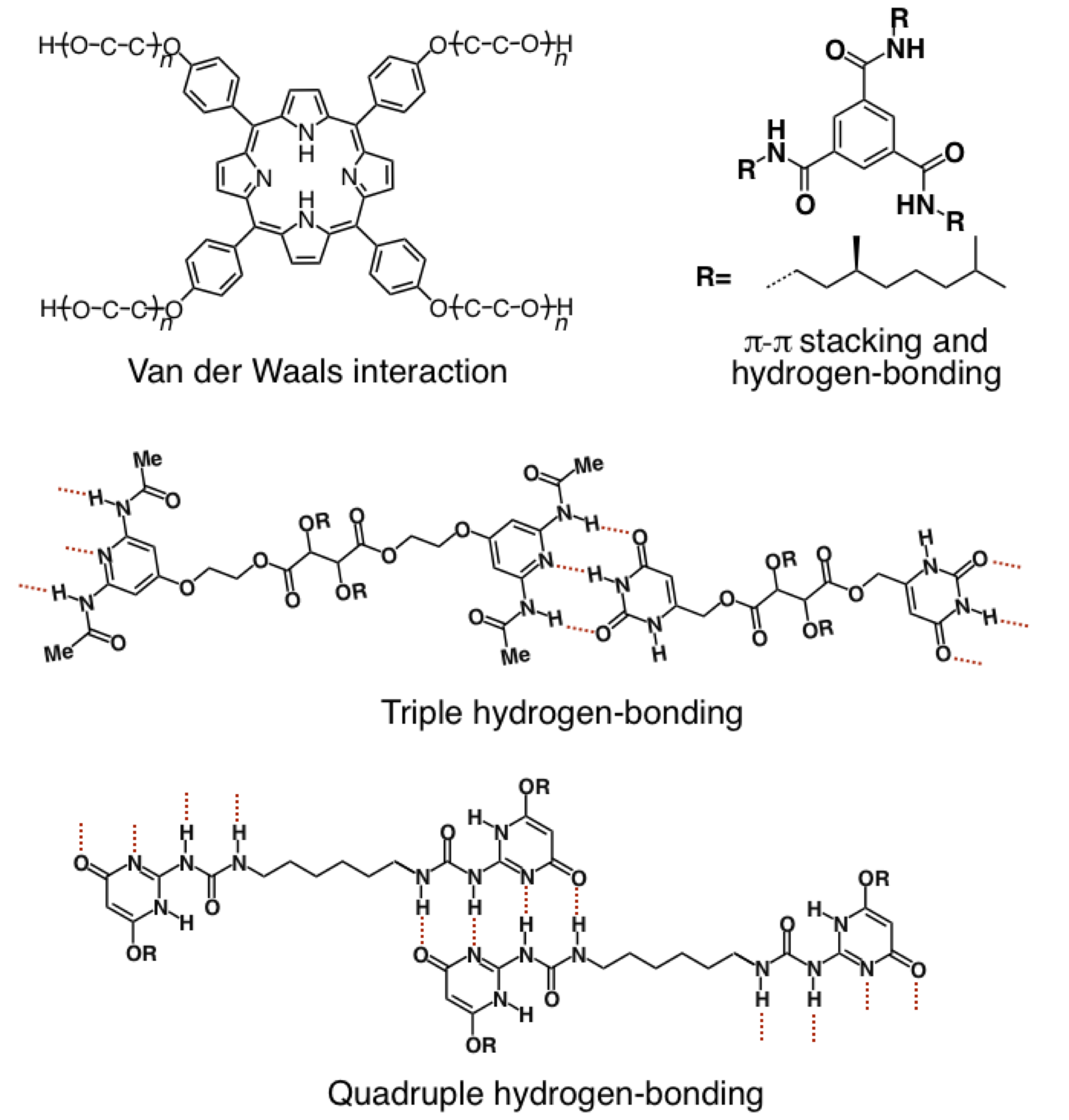
Monomeric motifs and types of interactions used for the preparation of supramolecular polymers

The preamble of the field of supramolecular polymers can be considered dye-aggregates and host-guest complexes. In early 19th century, it was noticed that dyes aggregate via "a special kind of polymerization". In 1988, Takuzo Aida, a Japanese polymer chemist, reported the concept of cofacial assembly wherein the amphiphilic porphyrin monomers are connected via van der Waals interaction forming one-dimensional architectures in solution, which can be considered as a prototype of supramolecular polymers. Soon thereafter, one-dimensional aggregates were described based on hydrogen bonding interaction in the crystalline state. With a different strategy using hydrogen bonds, Jean M. J. Fréchet showed in 1989 that mesogenic molecules with carboxylic acid and pyridyl motifs, upon mixing in bulk, heterotropically dimerize to form a stable liquid crystalline structure. In 1990, Jean-Marie Lehn showed that this strategy can be expanded to form a new category of polymers, which he called "liquid crystalline supramolecular polymer" using complementary triple hydrogen bonding motifs in bulk. In 1993, M. Reza Ghadiri reported a nanotubular supramolecular polymer where a b-sheet-forming macrocyclic peptide monomer assembled together via multiple hydrogen bonding between adjacent macrocycles. In 1994, Anselm. C. Griffin showed an amorphous supramolecular material using a single hydrogen bond between a homotropic molecules having carboxylic acid and pyridine termini. The idea to make mechanically strong polymeric materials by 1D supramolecular association of small molecules requires a high association constant between the repeating building blocks. In 1997, E.W. "Bert" Meijer reported a telechelic monomer with ureidopyrimidinone termini as a "self-complementary" quadruple hydrogen bonding motif and demonstrated that the resulting supramolecular polymer in chloroform shows a temperature-dependent viscoelastic property in solution. This is the first demonstration that supramolecular polymers, when sufficiently mechanically robust, are physically entangled in solution.

== Formation mechanisms ==
Monomers undergoing supramolecular polymerization are considered to be in equilibrium with the growing polymers, and thermodynamic factors therefore dominate the system. However, when the constituent monomers are connected via strong and multivalent interactions, a "metastable" kinetic state can dominate the polymerization. An externally supplied energy, in the form of heat in most cases, can transform the "metastable" state into a thermodynamically stable polymer. A clear understanding of multiple pathways exist in supramolecular polymerization is still under debate, however, the concept of "pathway complexity", introduced by E.W. "Bert" Meijer, shed a light on the kinetic behavior of supramolecular polymerization. Thereafter, many dedicated scientists are expanding the scope of "pathway complexity" because it can produce a variety of interesting assembled structures from the same monomeric units. Along this line of kinetically controlled processes, supramolecular polymers having "stimuli-responsive" and "thermally bisignate" characteristics is also possible.

In conventional covalent polymerization, two models based on step-growth and chain-growth mechanisms are operative. Nowadays, a similar subdivision is acceptable for supramolecular polymerization; isodesmic also known as equal-K model (step-growth mechanism) and cooperative or nucleation-elongation model (chain-growth mechanism). A third category is seeded supramolecular polymerization, which can be considered as a special case of chain-growth mechanism.

=== Step-growth polymerization ===
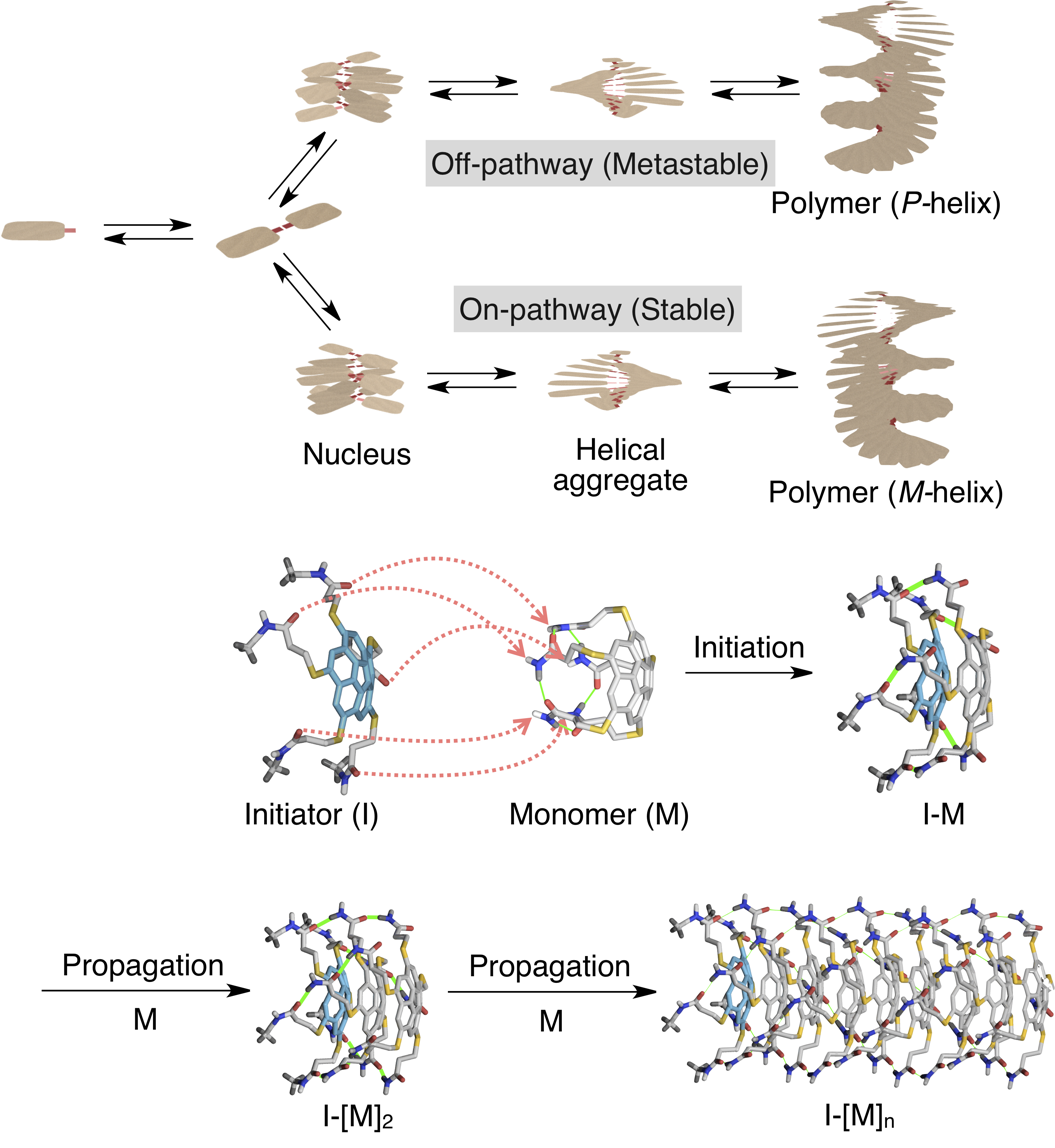
Schematics of "pathway-complexity" and "chain-growth" mechanisms operative in supramolecular polymerization

Supramolecular equivalent of step-growth mechanism is commonly known as isodesmic or equal-K model (K represents the total binding interaction between two neighboring monomers). In isodesmic supramolecular polymerization, no critical temperature or concentration of monomers is required for the polymerization to occur and the association constant between polymer and monomer is independent of the polymer chain length. Instead, the length of the supramolecular polymer chains rises as the concentration of monomers in the solution increases, or as the temperature decreases. In conventional polycondensation, the association constant is usually large that leads to a high degree of polymerization; however, a byproduct is observed. In isodesmic supramolecular polymerization, due to non-covalent bonding, the association between monomeric units is weak, and the degree of polymerization strongly depends on the strength of interaction, i.e. multivalent interaction between monomeric units. For instance, supramolecular polymers consisting of bifunctional monomers having single hydrogen bonding donor/acceptor at their termini usually end up with low degree of polymerization, however those with quadrupole hydrogen bonding, as in the case of ureidopyrimidinone motifs, result in a high degree of polymerization. In ureidopyrimidinone-based supramolecular polymer, the experimentally observed molecular weight at semi-dilute concentrations is in the order of 10^{6} Dalton and the molecular weight of the polymer can be controlled by adding mono-functional chain-cappers.

=== Chain-growth polymerization ===
Conventional chain-growth polymerization involves at least two phases; initiation and propagation, while and in some cases termination and chain transfer phases also occur. Chain-growth supramolecular polymerization in a broad sense involves two distinct phases; a less favored nucleation and a favored propagation. In this mechanism, after the formation of a nucleus of a certain size, the association constant is increased, and further monomer addition becomes more favored, at which point the polymer growth is initiated. Long polymer chains will form only above a minimum concentration of monomer and below a certain temperature. However, to realize a covalent analogue of chain-growth supramolecular polymerization, a challenging prerequisite is the design of appropriate monomers that can polymerize only by the action of initiators. Recently one example of chain-growth supramolecular polymerization with "living" characteristics is demonstrated. In this case, a bowl-shaped monomer with amide-appended side chains form a kinetically favored intramolecular hydrogen bonding network and does not spontaneously undergo supramolecular polymerization at ambient temperatures. However, an N-methylated version of the monomer serves as an initiator by opening the intramolecular hydrogen bonding network for the supramolecular polymerization, just like ring-opening covalent polymerization. The chain end in this case remains active for further extension of supramolecular polymer and hence chain-growth mechanism allows for the precise control of supramolecular polymer materials.

=== Seeded polymerization ===
This is a special category of chain-growth supramolecular polymerization, where the monomer nucleates only in an early stage of polymerization to generate "seeds" and becomes active for polymer chain elongation upon further addition of a new batch of monomer. A secondary nucleation is suppressed in most of the case and thus possible to realize a narrow polydispersity of the resulting supramolecular polymer. In 2007, Ian Manners and Mitchell A. Winnik introduced this concept using a polyferrocenyldimethylsilane–polyisoprene diblock copolymer as the monomer, which assembles into cylindrical micelles. When a fresh feed of the monomer is added to the micellar "seeds" obtained by sonication, the polymerization starts in a living polymerization manner. They named this method as crystallization-driven self-assembly (CDSA) and is applicable to construct micron-scale supramolecular anisotropic structures in 1D–3D. A conceptually different seeded supramolecular polymerization was shown by Kazunori Sugiyasu in a porphyrin-based monomer bearing amide-appended long alkyl chains. At low temperature, this monomer preferentially forms spherical J-aggregates while fibrous H-aggregates at higher temperature. By adding a sonicated mixture of the J-aggregates ("seeds") into a concentrated solution of the J-aggregate particles, long fibers can be prepared via living seeded supramolecular polymerization. Frank Würthner achieved similar seeded supramolecular polymerization of amide functionalized perylene bisimide as monomer. Importantly, the seeded supramolecular polymerization is also applicable to prepare supramolecular block copolymers.

== Examples ==
=== Hydrogen bonding interaction ===
Monomers capable of forming single, double, triple or quadruple hydrogen bonding has been utilized for making supramolecular polymers, and increased association of monomers obviously possible when monomers have maximum number of hydrogen bonding donor/acceptor motifs. For instance, ureidopyrimidinone-based monomer with self-complementary quadruple hydrogen bonding termini polymerized in solution, accordingly with the theory of conventional polymers and displayed a distinct viscoelastic nature at ambient temperatures.

=== π-π stacking ===
Monomers with aromatic motifs such as bis(merocyanine), oligo(para-phenylenevinylene) (OPV), perylene bisimide (PBI) dye, cyanine dye, corannulene and nano-graphene derivatives have been employed to prepare supramolecular polymers. In some cases, hydrogen bonding side chains appended onto the core aromatic motif help to hold the monomer strongly in the supramolecular polymer. A notable system in this category is a nanotubular supramolecular polymer formed by the supramolecular polymerization of amphiphilic hexa-peri-hexabenzocoronene (HBC) derivatives. Generally, nanotubes are categorized as 1D objects morphologically, however, their walls adopt a 2D geometry and therefore require a different design strategy. HBC amphiphiles in polar solvents solvophobically assemble into a 2D bilayer membrane, which roles up into a helical tape or a nanotubular polymer. Conceptually similar amphiphilic design based on cyanine dye and zinc chlorin dye also polymerize in water resulting in nanotubular supramolecular polymers.

=== Host-guest interaction ===
A variety of supramolecular polymers can be synthesized by using monomers with host-guest complementary binding motifs, such as crown ethers/ammonium ions, cucurbiturils/viologens, calixarene/viologens, cyclodextrins/adamantane derivatives, and pillar arene/imidazolium derivatives [30–33]. When the monomers are "heteroditopic", supramolecular copolymers results, provided the monomers does not homopolymerize. Akira Harada was one of the firstwhorecognize the importance of combining polymers and cyclodextrins. Feihe Huang showed an example of supramolecular alternating copolymer from two heteroditopic monomers carrying both crown ether and ammonium ion termini. Takeharo Haino demonstrated an extreme example of sequence control in supramolecular copolymer, where three heteroditopic monomers are arranged in an ABC sequence along the copolymer chain. The design strategy utilizing three distinct binding interactions; ball-and-socket (calix[5]arene/C60), donor-acceptor (bisporphyrin/trinitrofluorenone), and Hamilton's H-bonding interactions is the key to attain a high orthogonality to form an ABC supramolecular terpolymer.

== Chirality ==
Stereochemical information of a chiral monomer can be expressed in a supramolecular polymer. Helical supramolecular polymer with P-and M-conformation are widely seen, especially those composed of disc-shaped monomers. When the monomers are achiral, both P-and M-helices are formed in equal amounts. When the monomers are chiral, typically due to the presence of one or more stereocenters in the side chains, the diastereomeric relationship between P- and M-helices leads to the preference of one conformation over the other. Typical example is a C_{3}-symmetric disk-shaped chiral monomer that forms helical supramolecular polymers via the "majority rule". A slight excess of one enantiomer of the chiral monomer resulted in a strong bias to either the right-handed or left-handed helical geometry at the supramolecular polymer level. In this case, a characteristic nonlinear dependence of the anisotropic factor, g, on the enantiomeric excess of a chiral monomer can be generally observed. Like in small molecule based chiral system, chirality of a supramolecular polymer also affected by chiral solvents. Some application such as a catalyst for asymmetric synthesis and circular polarized luminescence are observed in chiral supramolecular polymers too.

== Copolymers ==
A copolymer is formed from more than one monomeric species. Advanced polymerization techniques have been established for the preparation of covalent copolymers, however supramolecular copolymers are still in its infancy and is slowly progressing. In recent years, all plausible category of supramolecular copolymers such as random, alternating, block, blocky, or periodic has been demonstrated in a broad sense.

== Properties ==
Supramolecular polymers are the subject of research in academia and industry.

=== Reversibility and dynamicity ===
The stability of a supramolecular polymer can be described using the association constant, K_{ass}. When K_{ass} ≤ 10^{4}M^{−1}, the polymeric aggregates are typically small in size and do not show any interesting properties and when K_{ass}≥ 10^{10} M^{−1}, the supramolecular polymer behaves just like covalent polymers due to the lack of dynamics. So, an optimum K_{ass} = 10^{4}–10^{10}M^{−1}need to be attained for producing functional supramolecular polymers. The dynamics and stability of the supramolecular polymers often affect by the influence of additives (e.g. co-solvent or chain-capper). When a good solvent, for instance chloroform, is added to a supramolecular polymer in a poor solvent, for instance heptane, the polymer disassembles. However, in some cases, cosolvents contribute the stabilization/destabilization of supramolecular polymer. For instance, supramolecular polymerization of a hydrogen bonding porphyrin-based monomer in a hydrocarbon solvent containing a minute amount of a hydrogen bond scavenging alcohol shows distinct pathways, i.e. polymerization favored both by cooling as well as heating, and is known as "thermally bisignate supramolecular polymerization". In another example, minute amounts of molecularly dissolved water molecules in apolar solvents, like methylcyclohexane, become part of the supramolecular polymer at lower temperatures, due to specific hydrogen bonding interaction between the monomer and water.

=== Self-healing ===
Supramolecular polymers may be relevant to self-healing materials. A supramolecular rubber based on vitrimers can self-heal simply by pressing the two broken edges of the material together. High mechanical strength of a material and self-healing ability are generally mutually exclusive. Thus, a glassy material that can self-heal at room temperature remained a challenge until recently. A supramolecularly polymer based on ether-thiourea is mechanically robust (e= 1.4 GPa) but can self-heal at room temperature by a compression at the fractured surfaces. The invention of self-healable polymer glass updated the preconception that only soft rubbery materials can heal.

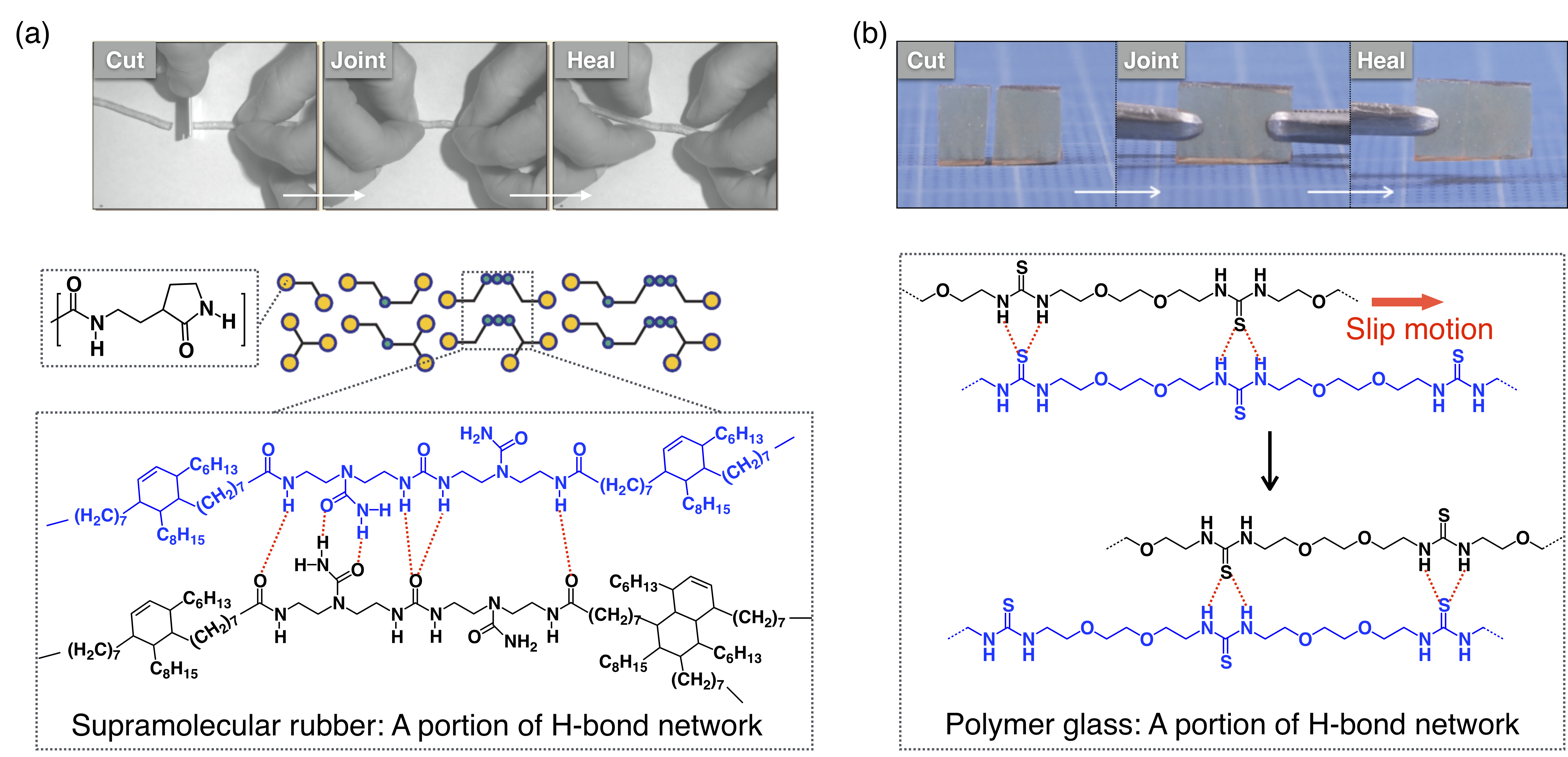
Examples of hydrogen-bonding based self-healing 'supramolecular rubber' (a) and 'polymer glass' (b).

Another strategy uses a bivalent poly(isobutylene)s (PIBs) functionalized with barbituric acid at head and tail. Multiple hydrogen bonding existed between the carbonyl group and amide group of barbituric acid enable it to form a supramolecular network. In this case, the snipped small PIBs-based disks can recover itself from mechanical damage after several-hour contact at room temperature.

Interactions between catechol and ferric ions exhibit pH-controlled self-healing supramolecular polymers. The formation of mono-, bis- and triscatehchol-Fe^{3+} complexes can be manipulated by pH, of which the bis- and triscatehchol-Fe^{3+} complexes show elastic moduli as well as self-healing capacity. For example, the triscatehchol-Fe^{3+} can restore its cohesiveness and shape after being torn. Chain-folding polyimide and pyrenyl-end-capped chains give rise to supramolecular networks.

=== Optoelectronic ===
By incorporating electron donors and electron acceptors into the supramolecular polymers, features of artificial photosynthesis can be replicated.

=== Biocompatible ===
DNA and protein are major examples of supramolecular polymers. Much effort has been devoted to related but synthetic materials. At the same time, their reversible and dynamic nature make supramolecular polymers bio-degradable, which surmounts hard-to-degrade issue of covalent polymers and makes supramolecular polymers a promising platform for biomedical applications. Being able to degrade in biological environment lowers potential toxicity of polymers to a great extent and therefore, enhances biocompatibility of supramolecular polymers.

=== Biomedical applications ===
Their capacity in biodegradation and biocompatibility shows potential in the development of drug delivery, gene transfection and other biomedical applications.

Drug delivery: Multiple cellular stimuli could induce responses in supramolecular polymers. The dynamic molecular skeletons of supramolecular polymers can be depolymerized when exposing to the external stimuli like pH in vivo. On the basis of this property, supramolecular polymers are capable of being a drug carrier. Making use of hydrogen bonding between nucleobases to induce self-assemble into pH-sensitive spherical micelles.

Gene transfection: Effective and low-toxic nonviral cationic vectors are highly desired in the field of gene therapy. On account of the dynamic and stimuli-responsive properties, supramolecular polymers offer a cogent platform to construct vectors for gene transfection. By combining ferrocene dimer with β-cyclodextrin dimer, a redox-control supramolecular polymers system has been proposed as a vector. In COS-7 cells, this supramolecular polymersic vector can release enclosed DNA upon exposing to hydrogen peroxide and achieve gene transfection.

=== Adjustable mechanical properties ===
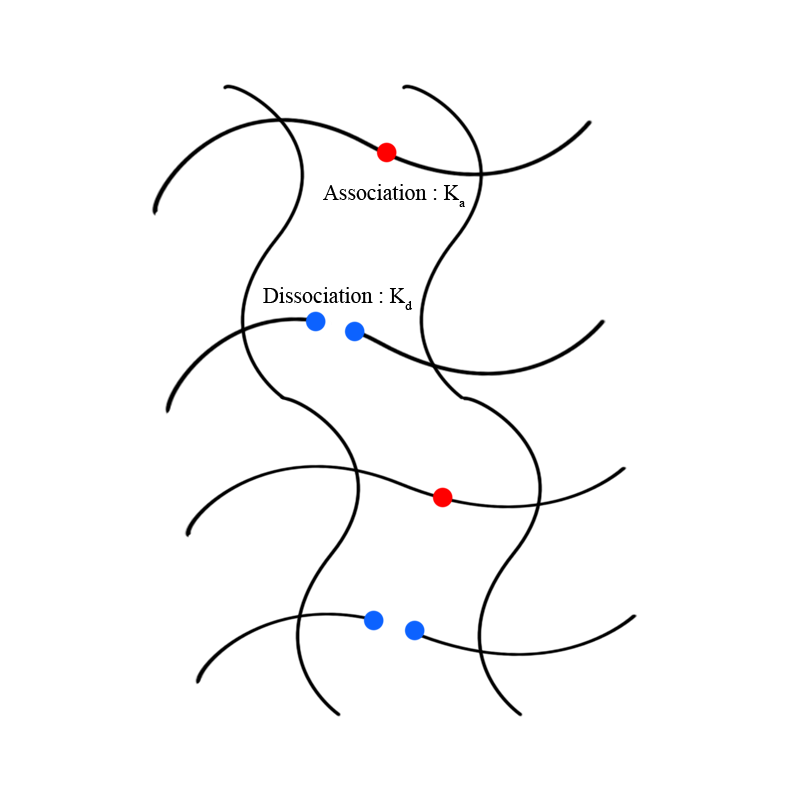
Association and dissociation kinetics for polymer dynamics

1. Basic Principle : Noncovalent interactions between polymer molecules significantly affect the mechanical properties of supramolecular polymers. More interaction between polymers tends to enhance the interaction strength between polymers. The association rate and dissociation rate of interacting groups in polymer molecules determine intermolecular interaction strength. For supramolecular polymers, the dissociation kinetics for dynamic networks plays a critical role in the material design and mechanical properties of the SPNs(supramolecular polymer networks). By changing the dissociation rate of polymer crosslink dynamics, supramolecular polymers have adjustable mechanical properties. With a slow dissociation rate for dynamic networks of supramolecular polymers, glass-like mechanical properties are dominant, on the other hand, rubber-like mechanical properties are dominant for a fast dissociation rate. These properties can be obtained by changing the molecular structure of the crosslink part of the molecule.
2. Experimental examples : One research controlled the molecular design of cucurbit[8]uril, CB[8]. The hydrophobic structure of the second guest of CB-mediated host-guest interaction within its molecular structure can tune the dissociative kinetics of the dynamic crosslinks. To slow the dissociation rate (kd), a stronger enthalpic driving force is needed for the second guest association (ka) to release more of the conformationally restricted water from the CB(8] cavity. In other words, the hydrophobic second guest exhibited the highest Keq and lowest kd values. Therefore, by polymerizing different concentrations of polymer subgroups, different dynamics of the intermolecular network can be designed.For example, mechanical properties like compressive strain can be tuned by this process. Polymerized with different hydrophobic subgroups in CB[B], The compressive strength was found to increase across the series in correlation with a decrease of kd, which could be tuned between 10–100MPa. NVI, is the most hydrophobic subgroup structure of monomer which have two benzene rings, on the other hand, BVI is the least hydrophobic subgroup structure of monomer via control group. Besides, varying concentrations of hydrophobic subgroups in CB[B], polymerized molecules show different compressive properties. Polymers with the highest concentration of hydrophobic subgroups show the highest compressive strain and vice versa.

== Biomaterials ==
Supramolecular polymers can simultaneously meet the requirements of aqueous compatibility, bio-degradability, biocompatibility, stimuli-responsiveness and other strict criterion. Consequently, supramolecular polymers could be applicable to the biomedical fields.

The reversible nature of supramolecular polymers can produce biomaterials that can sense and respond to physiological cues, or that mimic the structural and functional aspects of biological signaling.

Protein delivery, bio-imaging and diagnosis and tissue engineering, are also well developed.
