= Safelight =

Light source suitable for use in a darkroom

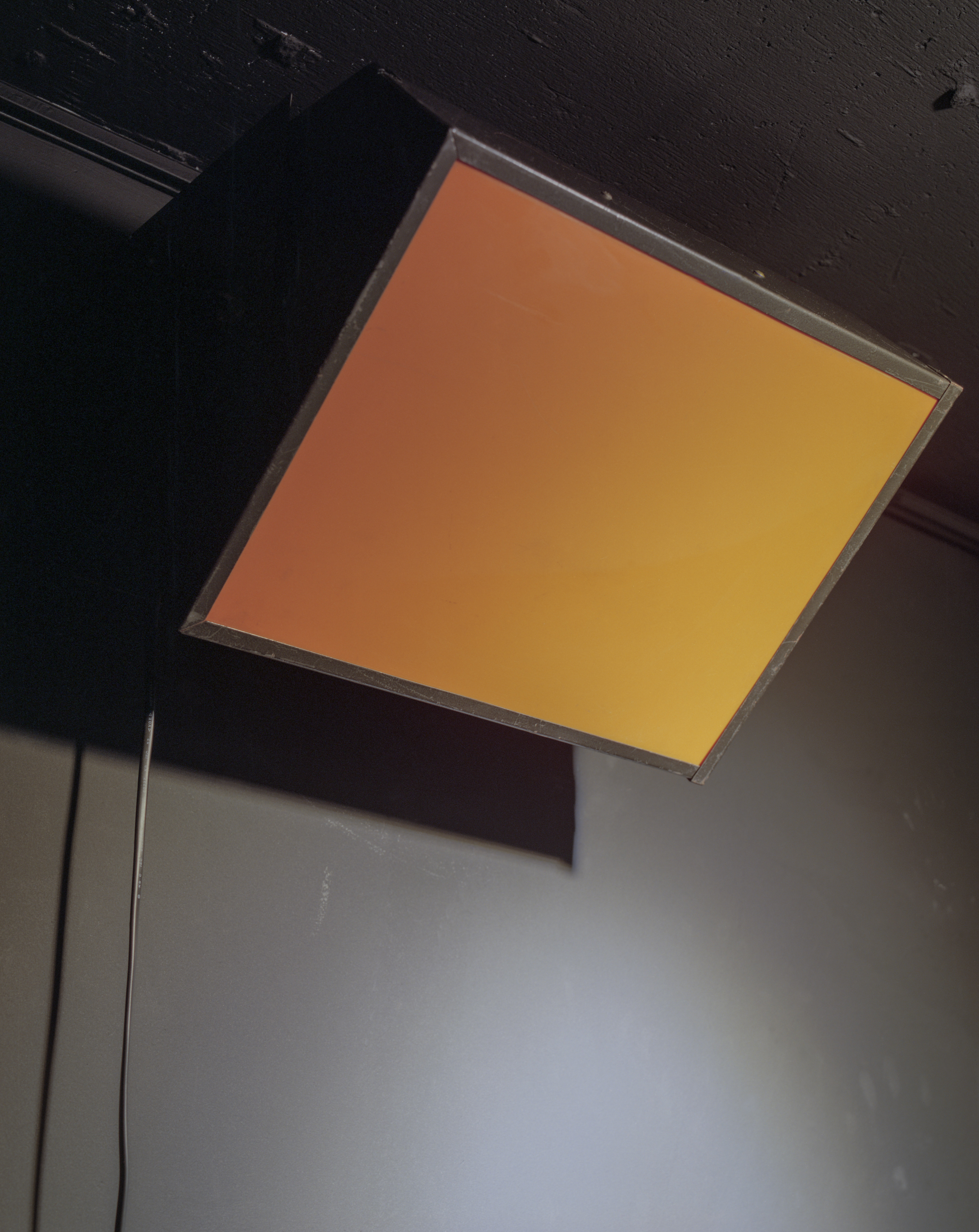
Fixed safelight in darkroom.

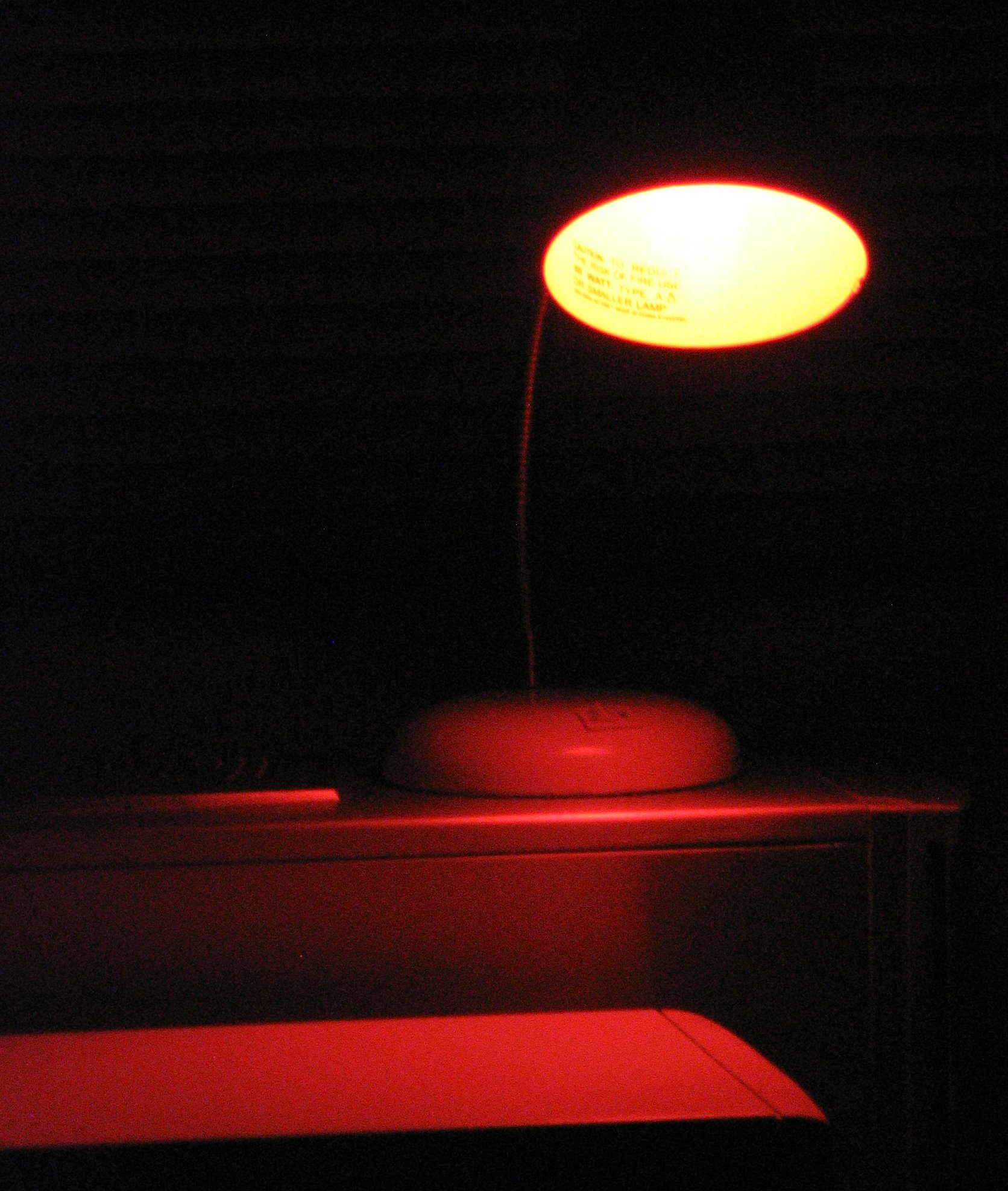
An amber (light brown) safelight for use with certain black-and-white photographic papers

A safelight is a light source suitable for use in a photographic darkroom. It provides illumination only from parts of the visible spectrum to which the photographic material in use is nearly, or completely, insensitive.

== Design ==
A safelight usually consists of an ordinary light bulb in a housing closed off by a coloured filter, but sometimes a special light bulb or fluorescent tube with suitable filter material or phosphor (in fluorescent tubes) coated directly on the glass is used in an ordinary fixture. More recently LEDs, which have a relatively narrow spectral bandwidth, are becoming more popular.

Differently sensitised materials require different safelights. In traditional black-and-white photographic printing, photographic papers normally are handled under an amber or red safelight, as such papers typically are sensitive only to blue and green light. Orthochromatic papers and films are also sensitive to yellow light and must be used only with a deep red safelight, not with an amber one. Panchromatic films and papers, nominally sensitive to the entire spectrum, sometimes have a region of minimum in their range of sensitivity that allows the careful use of safelight confined to that part of the spectrum. For example, Kodak Panalure panchromatic paper is tolerant of limited exposure to light filtered through a Kodak 13 Safelight Filter. Other panchromatic materials must be handled only in total darkness.

Many photosensitive materials used in technical and industrial applications, such as photoresist, are sensitive only to blue, violet, and ultraviolet light and may be handled under a brighter yellow safelight. Low-pressure sodium vapour lamps sometimes are used in larger industrial darkrooms. They emit nearly monochromatic light at 589 nm (yellow), to which the materials are insensitive; as a result they can be extremely bright while still "safe".

The word safe in safelight is relative, as in most cases, a sensitised material eventually will be affected by its safelight if exposed to it for an extended length of time.

For its black-and-white papers, Ilford recommends its SL1 or 902 safelight with a 15 W bulb at a distance of at least 1.2 metres (4 ft), under which the papers should be safe for up to four minutes. Safelight filters gradually fade with use, and Ilford advises changing them each year. Darkroom conditions can be checked with a safelight test, in which a sheet of paper given a faint grey exposure under the enlarger is exposed in sections to the safelight for increasing times, up to about four minutes, and then processed; if the sections show no change in density, the conditions are safe for that time.

== See also ==
- Photographic processing
- Purkinje effect
