= Bert Meijer =

Dutch organic chemist

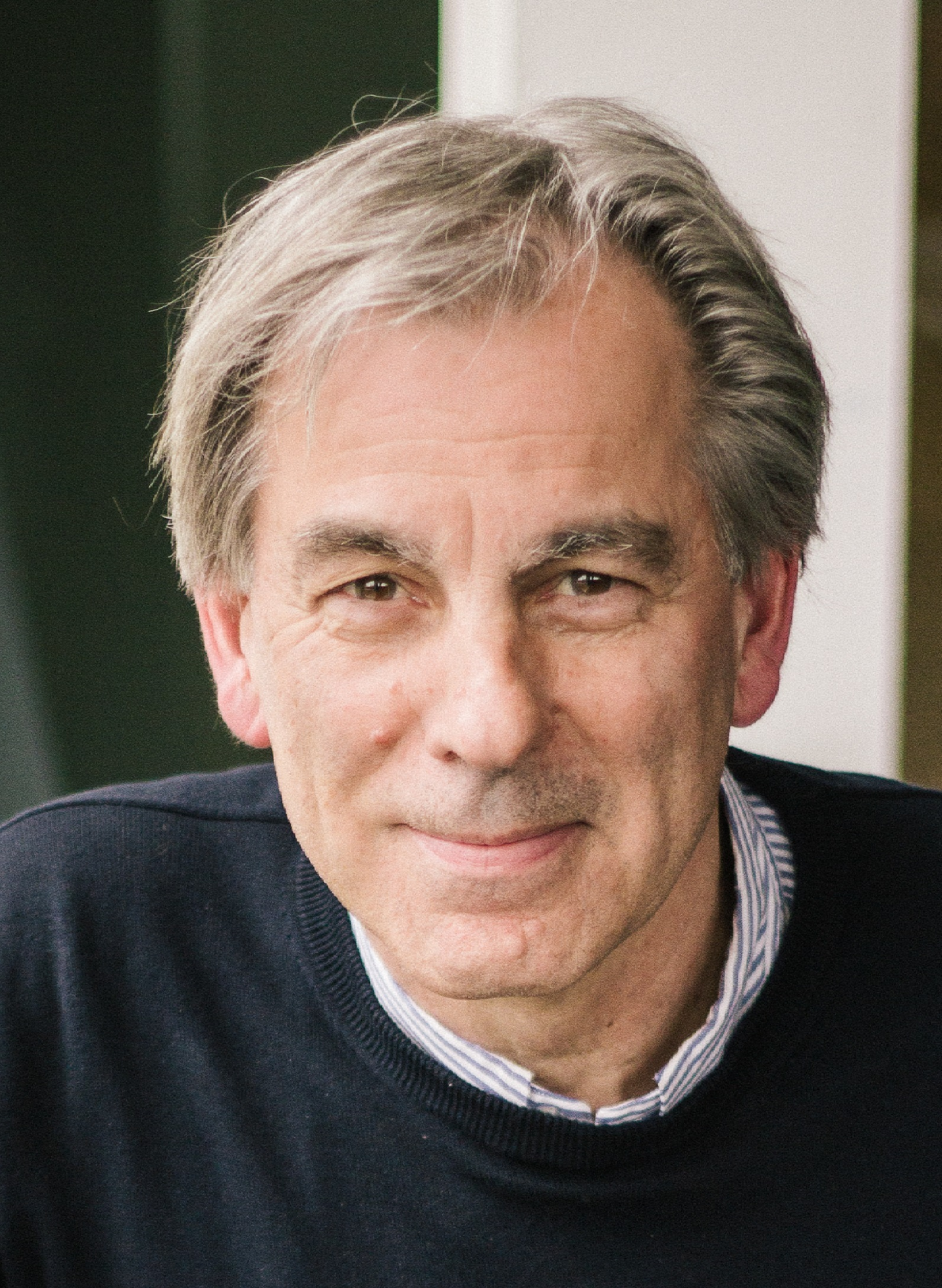
- Bert Meijer (2016)
- Born: Egbert Willem Meijer; 22 April 1955 (age 71); Groningen, Netherlands
- Education: Groningen University
- Known for: Dendrimers, supramolecular polymers, molecular self-assembly
- Scientific career
- Fields: Chemistry; Supramolecular chemistry, Materials Chemistry and Polymer Chemistry
- Workplaces: Eindhoven University of Technology
- Doctoral advisor: Professor Hans Wijnberg
- Website: http://www.meijerlab.nl/

Egbert Willem Meijer (born 1955) is a Dutch organic chemist, known for his work in the fields of supramolecular chemistry, materials chemistry and polymer chemistry. Meijer, who is distinguished professor of Molecular Sciences at Eindhoven University of Technology (TU/e) and Academy Professor of the Royal Netherlands Academy of Arts and Sciences, is considered one of the founders of the field of supramolecular polymer chemistry. Meijer is a prolific author, sought-after academic lecturer and recipient of multiple awards in the fields of organic and polymer chemistry. In 2025, he was elected to the American Philosophical Society.

== Education ==
After attending secondary school in Appingedam where he graduated in 1972, Meijer received his education in Organic Chemistry at the University of Groningen. He obtained his MSc degree in 1978, and subsequently his PhD degree under supervision of Professor Hans Wijnberg in 1982. Meijer graduated summa cum laude with his thesis on 'Chemiluminescence in action: syntheses, properties, and applications of 1,2-dioxetanes'.

== Career ==
Meijer started his career in 1982 at the Philips Research Laboratories in Eindhoven as a research scientist in Molecular Materials. In 1989 he moved to DSM Research in Geleen to become head of the department for New Materials. In 1991 Meijer was installed as full professor of Organic Chemistry at the department for Chemistry & Chemical Engineering of Eindhoven University of Technology (TU/e) and in 1999 at the department for Biomedical Engineering at the same university. Since 2004 Bert Meijer is a distinguished university professor of Molecular Sciences at TU/e, where he founded the Institute for Complex Molecular Systems and served as its Scientific Director from 2008 until 2018. Meijer is adjunct professor of Macromolecular Chemistry at Radboud University Nijmegen since 1994 and distinguished visiting professor at the University of California, Santa Barbara since 2008. In 2014 Bert Meijer was inducted as Academy Professor of the Royal Netherlands Academy of Arts and Sciences.

== Contributions to research ==
Meijer's research focuses on supramolecular systems with special properties and functions. It's founded on the principles of synthetic and organic chemistry to find solutions to challenges in materials science and life sciences. Meijer is recognized as a pioneer in the field of supramolecular materials, being one of the first chemists to explore and develop functional supramolecular polymers as a new class of materials. Via advanced molecular design and synthesis he has realized systems in which monomeric units self-assemble into long supramolecular polymeric chains, resulting in materials displaying unique dynamic properties that were thought to be exclusively reserved for macromolecules. His new class of supramolecular structures thus led to an adjusted definition of Staudinger’s description of what polymers are.

Meijer's career took off with breakthrough results in dendrimer chemistry including a dendritic box and super-amphiphiles (being the first examples of polymersomes). He synthesized poly(propylene imine) dendrimers that are now produced at commercially relevant quantities (at multiple kilogram scale) worldwide. His dendrimers form the basic compound of a phosphate binder currently used in the clinic. Meijer also developed novel semiconducting polymers with high electron mobilities. His exploration of the combination of chirality and mesoscopic morphology in these polymers led to the fabrication of an LED that emits circularly polarized light. Many years later the insights into chiral semiconductors were used to optimize the water splitting in a photoelectrochemical cell.

Meijer's discovery of ureidopyrimidinone-based supramolecular polymers is a landmark in supramolecular chemistry. He designed a simple quadruple hydrogen-bonded building block that is self-complementary and exhibits a very large association constant. Bringing two of these units together with a spacer resulted in a supramolecular polymer with unprecedented properties. Depending on the conditions applied it on the one hand it possess all the properties of macromolecules, both in solution and solid state, while on the other hand it displays the dynamic nature of organic molecules tied together via non-covalent bonds. Today, the concept of supramolecular polymers is investigated in many international academic and industrial laboratories. The Meijer lab has successfully started the company SupraPolix, offering a supramolecular polymer platform as a key component in several applications, including glue (as superflow elastomers), cosmetics and regenerative medicine of heart valves, for which clinical trials are underway by the Dutch/Swiss company Xeltis.

Following up on his discovery Meijer has unraveled the mechanisms behind chemical self-assembly and has proven that supramolecular polymerizations can be classified, based on their mechanism, in a way similar to conventional polymerizations. Current research in the Meijer lab focuses on complex multi-component supramolecular polymer systems and their assembly behaviour Also the potential use of supramolecular polymers is explored as mimics of biological tissue using a modular approach that allows for easy adjustment of their dynamics to external stimuli.

== Achievements and awards ==
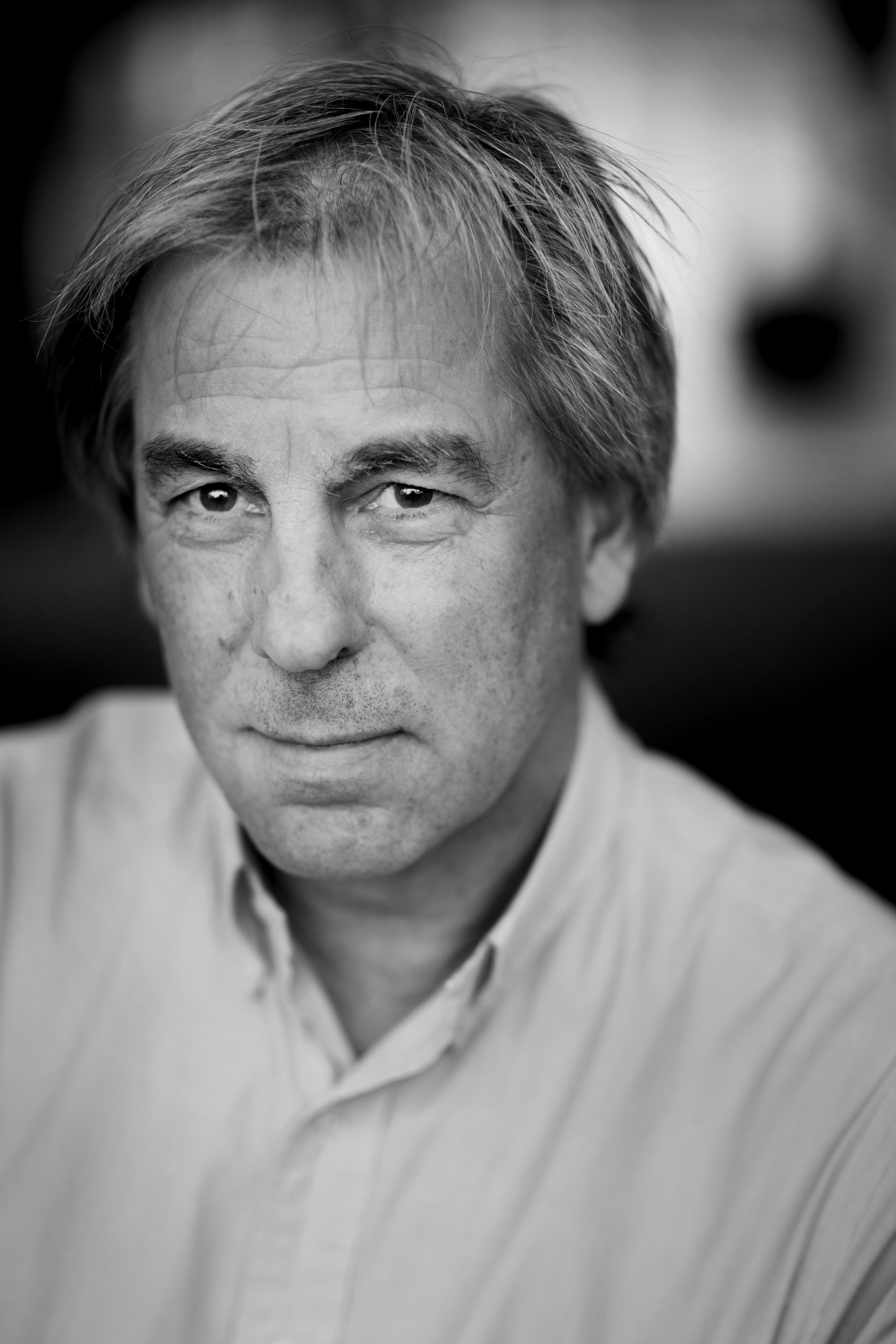
Bert Meijer (2014)

=== Scientific output and research management ===
Meijer has published over 600 peer reviewed research articles and reviews which have been cited more than 100.000 times, yielding him an H-index of well over 142. He guided 100+ PhD students and more than 25 of his former group members now hold tenured academic professorships worldwide. Meijer has over 20 patents and co-founded the companies SyMO-Chem, a professional contract research company (2000) and SupraPolix, focusing on supramolecular polymers (2003).

Since 2006 Meijer is the chairman of the International Scientific Advisory Board of DSM, in 2008 he founded the Institute for Complex Molecular Systems at Eindhoven University of Technology, and he chairs the 27 million euro national Dutch research program into 'Functional Molecular Systems' since 2012. Between 2017 and 2023 Meijer was a member of the Board of Trustees of Leiden University. Meijer also served as member of advisory or editorial boards of over 10 scientific journals, including Advanced Materials (since 1992), Angewandte Chemie (since 1998), Chemical Science (since 2010) and the Journal of the American Chemical Society (since 2010).

=== Academic invitations and memberships ===
Meijer has obtained visiting professorships and was invited to named lectureships at many universities. He was visiting professor at the universities of Leuven, Belgium (1995), Illinois (1998), Bordeaux (2007), Zhejiang (2008) and California, Santa Barbara (2008). He currently is a Humboldt visiting professor at the Free University Berlin (until 2024). He has been, amongst others, Bayer distinguished lecturer (Cornell, New York, 1998), Glaxo-Wellcome lecturer (Sheffield, 1998), Rohm & Haas lecturer (Berkeley, 2002), Xerox Distinguished Lecturer of Canada (Toronto and Montreal, 2004), Melville Lecturer (Cambridge University, 2006) Mordecai and Rivka Rubin Lecturer (Technion, Israel, 2015), Aldrich Lecturer (Stanford University, USA, 2015) and Eastman Lecturer (North Carolina, 2016). He gave the Van ‘t Hoff Centennial lecture at the Royal Netherlands Academy of Arts and Sciences in 2001, the Carothers Lecture at Dupont Wilmington in 2005 and provided the keynote science lecture at Lowlands University 2009, as part of the Lowlands music- and culture festival (Flevopolder, The Netherlands). In 2019, he was the Saul Winstein Lecturer at the University of California, Los Angeles and he was the 2020 Robert Robinson lecturer at the University of Oxford. He is also the 2025 Allan Hay lecturer at McGill University in Montreal.

Meijer is an elected member of the Royal Netherlands Academy of Arts and Sciences (KNAW, since 2003) and the Royal Holland Society of Sciences and Humanities (KHMW, since 1997), the Deutsche Akademie der Technikwissenschaften since 2012), the Nordrhein-Westfälische Akademie der Wissenschaften und der Künste (since 2014), and the Academia Europaea (since 2012). He is Honorary Fellow of the Chemical Research Society of India (since 2012) and Fellow of the American Association for the Advancement of Science (since 2015). Meijer is furthermore elected as an Honorary Member of the Royal Netherlands Chemical Society (KNCV, since 2018). In 2019, he was elected as a member of the European Academy of Sciences and as International Honorary Member of the American Academy of Arts and Sciences.

=== Awards ===
Meijer has received numerous prominent awards, including the Gold Medal of the Royal Netherlands Chemical Society (1993), the Spinoza Award of the Netherlands Organisation for Scientific Research (2001), the ACS Award in Polymer Chemistry (2006) and the AkzoNobel Science Award (2010). In 2010 he received an ERC Advanced Research Grant and he was awarded the Wheland Medal of the University of Chicago and the International Award of the Society of Polymer Science of Japan. In 2012 the ACS presented him the Arthur C. Cope Scholar Award. In 2013 Meijer held the Solvay International Chair in Chemistry, and in 2014 he won the Belgium Polymer Group Award and the Prelog Medal of ETH Zürich. That same year he received the Academy Professor Prize of the Netherlands Academy of Arts and Sciences appointed as a lifetime achievement award. In 2017 Meijer was installed Doctorem Honoris Causa at the University of Mons (Belgium) and awarded the Forschungspreis of the Humboldt Foundation (Germany) and the Nagoya Gold Medal Award in Organic Chemistry (Japan). In 2018, he was awarded a second ERC Advanced Research Grant and the Chirality Medal of the Società Chimica Italiana (Princeton, 2018). In 2019, Bert Meijer was installed Doctorem Honoris Causa at the Free University Berlin. In 2020, he received the title of Commander of the Order of the Netherlands Lion, the prestigious Dutch order of chivalry founded by King William I in 1815. On September 12, 2022, the German Chemical Society GDCh presented him the Hermann Staudinger Prize 2022 for his 'outstanding and creative contributions to the field of supramolecular polymer chemistry'. In May 2024, the PTN Medema Lecture Award was received by Meijer for his excellence in polymer science and his strong connection with the Dutch polymer community. On February the 12th, 2025 Le Grand Prix de la Fondation de la Maison de la Chimie will be awarded to honor his work in supramolecular polymer chemistry, in particular via non non-covalent interactions that led him to the concept of "quadrupolar hydrogen bonds".

== Personal life ==
Meijer was born in 1955 as the oldest son of Roelof Meijer and Winy Meijer–de Wit (both civil servants). In 1979 he married Iektje Oosterbeek with whom he has two sons: Roger Meijer (1985) and Wieger Meijer (1988).

== See also ==
- Subi Jacob George
