= Brooker's merocyanine =

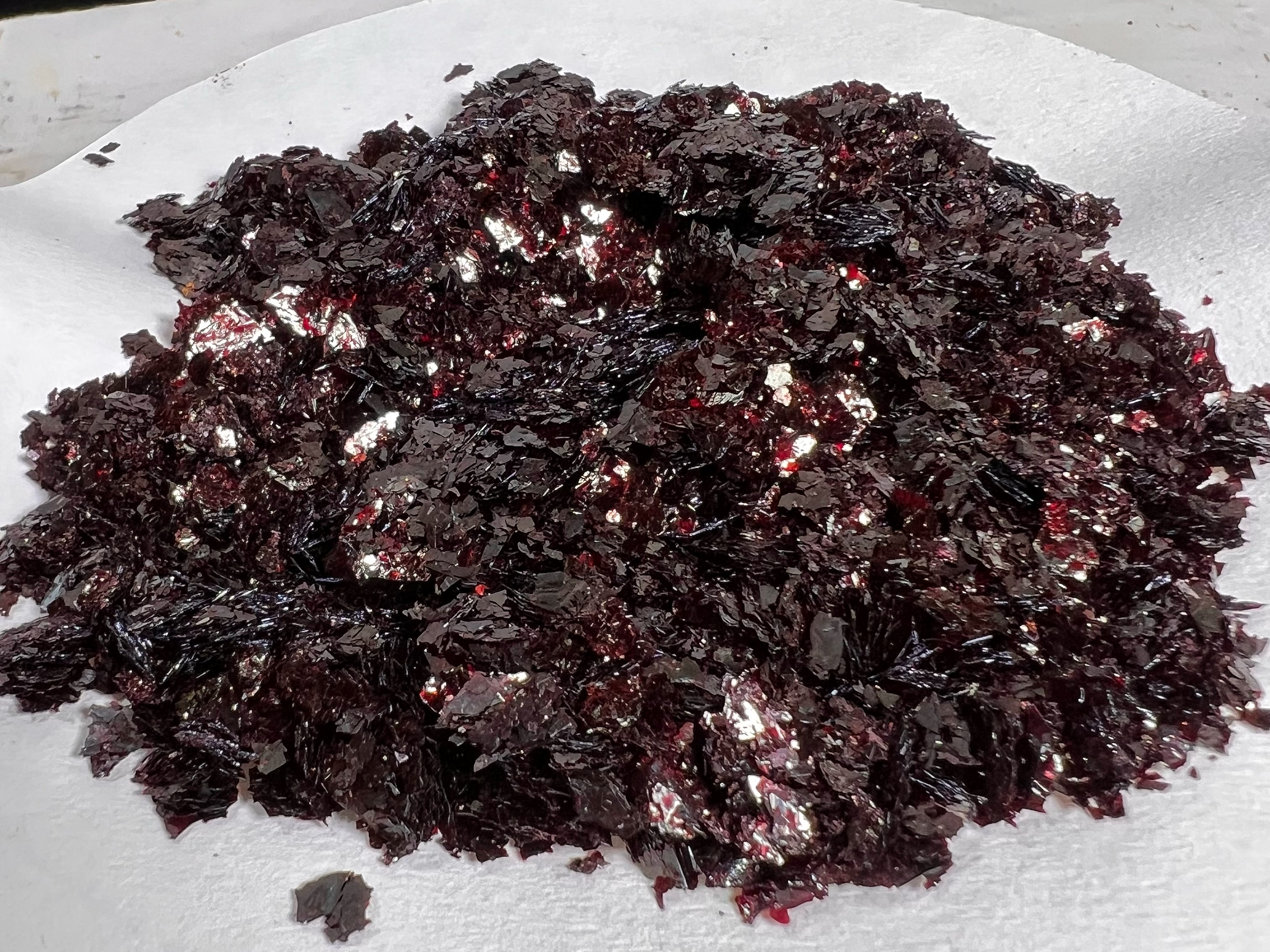

Names
- IUPAC name 1-methyl-4-[(oxocyclohexadienylidene)ethylidene]-1,4-dihydropyridine

Identifiers
CAS Number	23302-83-2
3D model (JSmol)	Interactive image
ChemSpider	226778
ECHA InfoCard	100.255.640
PubChem CID	258436
UNII	K765RJZ7AS
CompTox Dashboard (EPA)	DTXSID70293129
- InChI: InChI=1S/C14H13NO/c1-15-10-8-13(9-11-15)3-2-12-4-6-14(16)7-5-12/h2-11H,1H3 Key: DBOHWMPKJCJANT-UHFFFAOYSA-N; InChI=1/C14H13NO/c1-15-10-8-13(9-11-15)3-2-12-4-6-14(16)7-5-12/h2-11H,1H3 Key: DBOHWMPKJCJANT-UHFFFAOYAD
- SMILES: O=C\2\C=C/C(=C\C=C1\C=C/N(/C=C1)C)/C=C/2

Properties
Chemical formula	C_{14}H_{13}NO
Molar mass	211.26 g/mol
Appearance	Red crystals
Melting point	220 °C (428 °F; 493 K) (decomposes)
- Except where otherwise noted, data are given for materials in their standard state (at 25 °C [77 °F], 100 kPa). verify (what is ?) Infobox references

Brooker's merocyanine (MOED) is an organic dye belonging to the class of merocyanines. It is known for its solvatochromic properties.

== Solvatochromic effects ==
MOED is well-known to exhibit solvatochromism. In polar solvents, MOED appears yellow, whereas its solution in nonpolar solvents, such as acetone, are purple or blue. Similarly, protic and aprotic solvents affect the color of MOED in solutions.

Colors of MOED Solutions in Various Solvents
Solvent	Color	λ(max, nm)	Relative solvent polarity
Water	Yellow	442	1
Methanol	Red-orange	509	0.762
Ethanol	Red	510	0.654
2-Propanol	Violet	545	0.546
DMSO	Blue-violet	572	0.444
Acetone	Blue-violet	577	0.355
Pyridine	Blue	603	0.302
Chloroform	Blue	618	0.259

== Synthesis and structure ==
Brooker's merocyanine can be prepared by condensation of N-methyl-4-methylpyridinium with 4-hydroxybenzaldehyde. Two hydrates have been characterized by X-ray crystallography as well as the iodide salt of the protonated derivative. These studies reveal a planar molecule and phenolate- or phenol-like C-O single bonds.
