= Hypsochromic shift =

Change in a molecule's spectral band position to a shorter wavelength

In spectroscopy, hypsochromic shift (from Ancient Greek ὕψος (upsos) 'height' and χρῶμα (chrōma) 'color') is a change of spectral band position in the absorption, reflectance, transmittance, or emission spectrum of a molecule to a shorter wavelength (higher frequency). Because the blue color in the visible spectrum has a shorter wavelength than most other colors, this effect is also commonly called a blue shift. It should not be confused with a bathochromic shift, which is the opposite process – the molecule's spectra are changed to a longer wavelength (lower frequency).

Hypsochromic shifts can occur because of a change in environmental conditions. For example, a change in solvent polarity will result in solvatochromism. A series of structurally related molecules in a substitution series can also show a hypsochromic shift. Hypsochromic shift is a phenomenon seen in molecular spectra, not atomic spectra - it is thus more common to speak of the movement of the peaks in the spectrum rather than lines.

$$\Delta\lambda = \lambda\!_{\text{state 1} \atop \text{observed}} - \, \lambda\!_{\text{state 2} \atop \text{observed}}$$

where $\lambda$ is the wavelength of the spectral peak of interest and $\lambda\!_{\text{state 1} \atop \text{observed}} > \, \lambda\!_{\text{state 2} \atop \text{observed}}\!.$

For example, β-acylpyrrole will show a hypsochromic shift of 30-40 nm in comparison with α-acylpyrroles.

== See also ==
- Bathochromic shift, a change in band position to a longer wavelength (lower frequency).
