= Polymethine =

Class of chemical compounds

Polymethines are compounds made up from an odd number of methine groups (CH) bound together by alternating single and double bonds. Compounds made up from an even number of methine groups are known as polyenes.

== Polymethine dyes ==
Cyanines are synthetic dyes belonging to polymethine group. Anthocyanidins are natural plant pigments belonging to the group of the polymethine dyes.

Polymethines are fluorescent dyes that may be attached to nucleic acid probes for different uses, e.g., to accurately count reticulocytes.
