= Bathochromic shift =

Change in a molecule's spectral band position to a longer wavelength

In spectroscopy, bathochromic shift (from Greek βαθύς (bathys) 'deep' and χρῶμα (chrōma) 'color'; hence less common alternate spelling "bathychromic") is a change of spectral band position in the absorption, reflectance, transmittance, or emission spectrum of a molecule to a longer wavelength (lower frequency). Because the red color in the visible spectrum has a longer wavelength than most other colors, the effect is also commonly called a red shift.

Hypsochromic shift is a change to shorter wavelength (higher frequency).

== Conditions ==
It can occur because of a change in environmental conditions: for example, a change in solvent polarity will result in solvatochromism.

A series of structurally-related molecules in a substitution series can also show a bathochromic shift. Bathochromic shift is a phenomenon seen in molecular spectra, not atomic spectra; it is thus more common to speak of the movement of the peaks in the spectrum rather than lines.

$$\Delta\lambda = \lambda\!_{\text{state 2} \atop \text{observed}} - \, \lambda\!_{\text{state 1} \atop \text{observed}}$$

where $\lambda$ is the wavelength of the spectral peak of interest and $\lambda\!_{\text{state 2} \atop \text{observed}} > \, \lambda\!_{\text{state 1} \atop \text{observed}}.$

== Detection ==
Bathochromic shift is typically demonstrated using a spectrophotometer, colorimeter, or spectroradiometer.

== See also ==
- Chromism
- Solvatochromism
- Spectroscopy
