= Solvatochromism =

Change in color of a solution with different solvents

In chemistry, solvatochromism is the phenomenon observed when the colour of a solution is different when the solute is dissolved in different solvents.

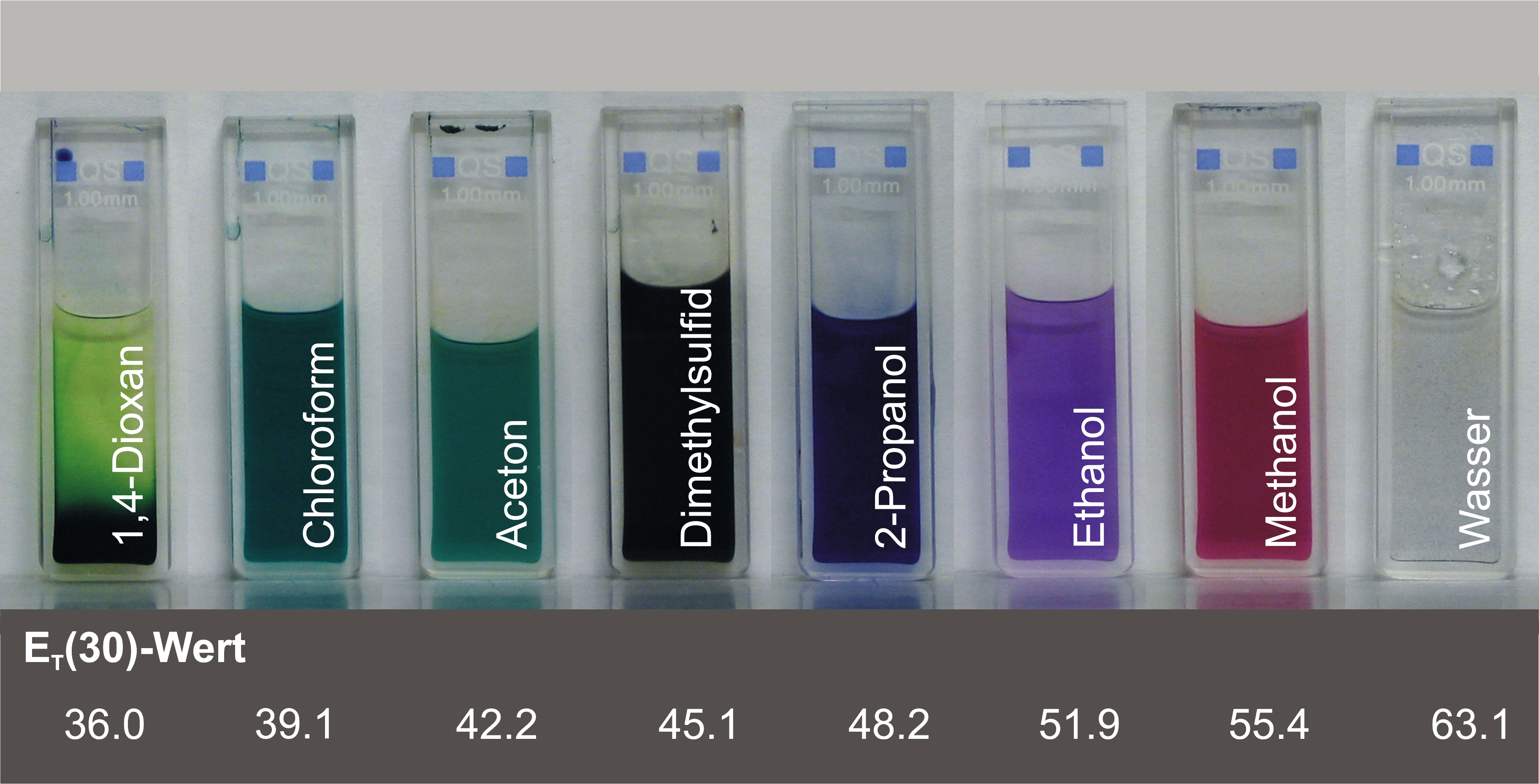
Reichardt's dye dissolved in different solvents

The solvatochromic effect is the way the spectrum of a substance (the solute) varies when the substance is dissolved in a variety of solvents. In this context, the dielectric constant and hydrogen bonding capacity are the most important properties of the solvent. With various solvents there is a different effect on the electronic ground state and excited state of the solute, so that the size of energy gap between them changes as the solvent changes. This is reflected in the absorption or emission spectrum of the solute as differences in the position, intensity, and shape of the spectroscopic bands. When the spectroscopic band occurs in the visible part of the electromagnetic spectrum, solvatochromism is observed as a change of colour. This is illustrated by Reichardt's dye, as shown in the image.

Negative solvatochromism corresponds to a hypsochromic shift (or blue shift) with increasing solvent polarity. An examples of negative solvatochromism is provided by 4-(4′-hydroxystyryl)-N-methylpyridinium iodide, which is red in 1-propanol, orange in methanol, and yellow in water.

Positive solvatochromism corresponds to a bathochromic shift (or red shift) with increasing solvent polarity. An example of positive solvatochromism is provided by 4,4'-bis(dimethylamino)fuchsone, which is orange in toluene, red in acetone.

The main value of the concept of solvatochromism is the context it provides to predict colors of solutions. Solvatochromism can in principle be used in sensors and in molecular electronics for construction of molecular switches. Solvatochromic dyes are used to measure solvent parameters, which can be used to explain solubility phenomena and predict suitable solvents for particular uses.

Solvatochromism of the photoluminescence/fluorescence of carbon nanotubes has been identified and used for optical sensor applications. In one such application, the wavelength of the fluorescence of peptide-coated carbon nanotubes was found to change when exposed to explosives, facilitating detection. However, more recently the small chromophore solvatochromism hypothesis has been challenged for carbon nanotubes in light of older and newer data showing electrochromic behavior. These and other observations regarding non-linear processes on the semiconducting nanotube suggest colloidal models will require new interpretations that are in line with classic semiconductor optical processes, including electrochemical processes, rather than small molecule physical descriptions. Conflicting hypotheses may be due to the fact the nanotube is only a single atom thick material interface unlike other "bulk" nanomaterials.
