= Cyanine =

Class of dyes

Cyanines are a family of synthetic dyes belonging to the polymethine dye group. The widely used Cy dyes are indocarbocyanines. Although the name cyanine derives etymologically from terms for shades of blue, their optical absoption spans the electromagnetic spectrum from near IR to UV.

In terms of their structures, cyanines consist of a conjugated system between two nitrogen atoms; in each resonance structure, exactly one nitrogen atom is an iminium. Typically, they form part of a nitrogenous heterocyclic system.

The main application for cyanine dyes is in biological labeling. Cyanines are found in some CD and DVD media as well as electrophotography.

== Nomenclature and classification ==
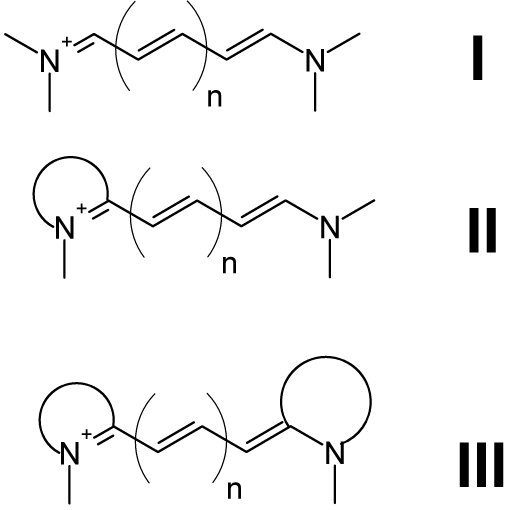
The Cyanines: I = Streptocyanines, II = Hemicyanines, III = Closed cyanines

Cyanines are often named to emphasize the number of methine groups (mono-, tri-, penta-, heptamethine). Older names are common, e.g., ‘’carbocyanine’’, ‘’dicarbocyanine’’, and ‘’tricarbocyanine’’ denote tri-, penta- and heptamethines. Some popular cyanine dyes are referred to by trade names such as Cy3 and Cy5. Some authors count the chain from nitrogen to nitrogen

- Streptocyanines or open chain cyanines:

R_{2}N^{+}=CH[CH=CH]_{n}-NR_{2} (I)

- Hemicyanines:

(N-heterocycle)^{+}=CH[CH=CH]_{n}-NR_{2}(II)

- Closed chain cyanines:

(N-heterocycle)^{+}=CH[CH=CH]_{n}-(N-heterocycle)(III)

- Other classes are recognized:, such as the Apocyanines, in which the two heterocycles are linked directly, without an intervening methine group; the only known examples are the yellow xantho- and red erythro-apocyanines.

In all cyanines, a polymethine chain links the two nitrogen atoms. Both nitrogens may each be independently part of a heteroaromatic moiety, such as pyrrole, imidazole, thiazole, pyridine, quinoline, indole, benzothiazole, etc. In addition, the polymethine chain of cyanines can bear various substituents allowing modulation of spectral properties.

Long-chain cyanine dyes are relatively fragile structure. Heptamethine cyanine dyes can undergo sponteneous thermal truncation to pentamethine cyanines, and the pentamethine cyanines are capable of similar decomposition in the presence of amine base to trimethine cyanines.

== History and use in industry ==
The first cyanine, subsequently named "quinoline blue", was reported in 1857, a result of experiments using impure quinoline obtained from coal tar.

Cyanines were subsequently shown to be useful in photography. They increase the sensitivity range of photographic emulsions, i.e., to increase the range of wavelengths which will form an image on the film, making the film panchromatic. Cyanines are also used in CD-R and DVD-R media. The ones used are mostly green or light blue colour, and are chemically unstable. For that reason, unstabilized cyanine discs are unsuitable for archival CD and DVD use. Recent cyanine discs contain stabilizers, typically a metal atom bonded to the cyanine molecule, that slow the deterioration significantly. These discs are often rated with an archival life of 75 years or more. The other dyes used in CD-Rs are phthalocyanine and azo.

=== Use in biotechnology ===
For applications to biotechnology, special cyanine dyes are synthesized from 1, 3, 5 or 7-methine structures with reactive groups on either one or both of the nitrogen ends so that they can be chemically linked to either nucleic acids or protein molecules. Labeling is done for visualization and quantification purposes. Biological applications include comparative genomic hybridization and gene chips, which are used in transcriptomics, and various studies on RNA localization, molecular interaction studies by Förster resonance energy transfer (FRET) and fluorescent immunoassays. Cy3 conjugated to a nucleic acid is capable of protein-induced fluorescence enhancement (PIFE), a single-molecule experiment to observe the biophysics of protein-nucleic acid binding. This has been attributed to inhibition of trans-to-cis photoisomerization.

Cyanine dyes are available with different modifications such as methyl, ethyl or butyl substituents, carboxyl, acetylmethoxy, and sulfo groups which alter their hydrophilicity.

Probe	Ex (nm)	Em (nm)	MW	Quantum yield
Cy2	489	506	714	QY 0.12
Cy3	(512);550	570;(615)	767	QY 0.15 *
Cy3B	558	572;(620)	658	QY 0.67
Cy3.5	581	594;(640)	1102	QY 0.15
Cy5	(625);650	670	792	QY 0.27
Cy5.5	675	694	1128	QY 0.28
Cy7	743	767	818	QY 0.28

Ex (nm): Excitation wavelength in nanometers
Em (nm): Emission wavelength in nanometers
MW: Molecular weight
QY: Quantum yield

* Depends strongly on viscosity, temperature, and biomolecular interactions.

== Common cyanine dyes and their uses ==
Because they yield bright and stable fluorescence, cyanines are competitive with conventional dyes such as fluorescein and rhodamines.

- Cy3 and Cy5 are the most popular, typically used combined for 2 color detection.

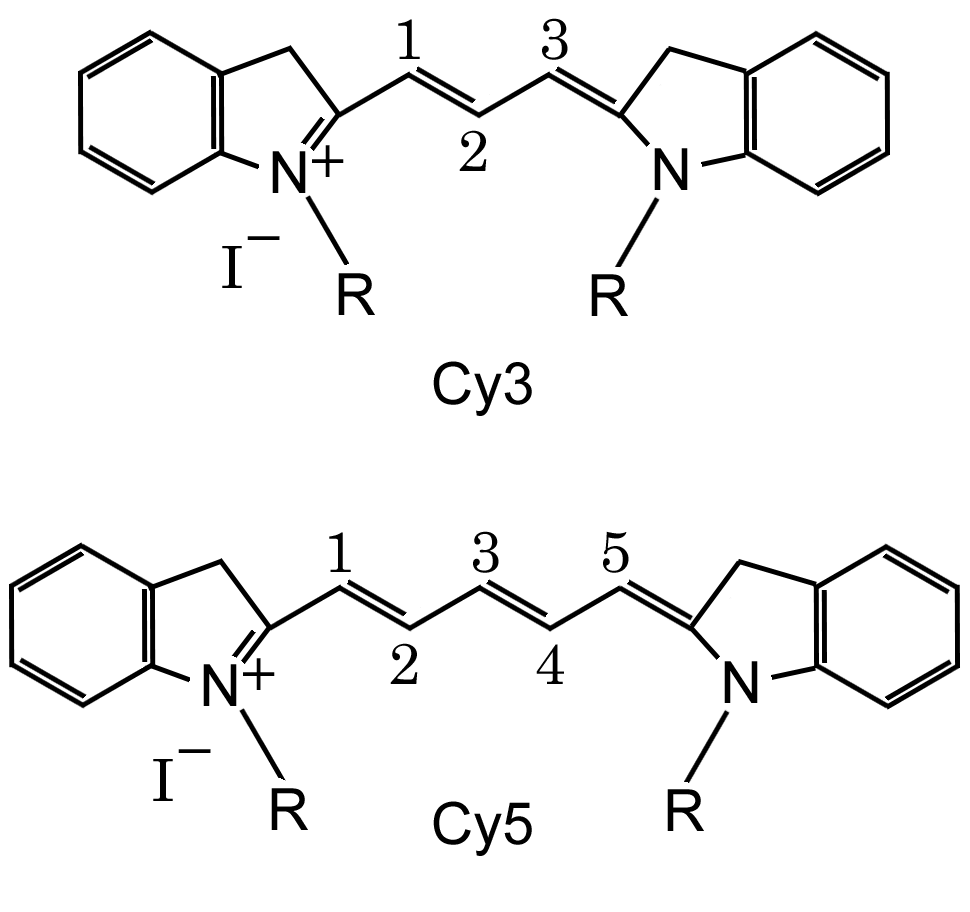

Cy3 fluoresces greenish yellow (~550 nm excitation, ~570 nm emission), while Cy5 is fluorescent in the far-red region (~650 excitation, 670 nm emission). Cy3 can be detected by various fluorometers, imagers, and microscopes with standard filters for tetramethylrhodamine (TRITC). Due to its high molar extinction coefficient, this dye is also easily detected by naked eye on electrophoresis gels, and in solution. Cy5 became a popular replacement for far red fluorescent dyes because of its high extinction coefficient (as small as 1 nanomol can be detected in gel electrophoresis by naked eye) and its fluorophore emission maximum in the red region, where many CCD detectors have maximum sensitivity and biological objects give low background interference.

The scanners actually use diverse laser emission wavelengths (typically 532 nm and 635 nm) and filter wavelengths (550-600 nm and 655-695 nm) to avoid background contamination. They are thus able to easily distinguish colors from Cy3 and from Cy5, and also able to quantify the amount of Cy3 and Cy5 labeling in one sample (multiparametric detection).

- Other cyanine dyes are useful:

Cy3.5 can replace sulfoRhodamine 101.

Cy5.5 is a near-infrared (IR) fluorescence-emitting dye (excitation/emission maximum 678/694 nm).

Cy7 is a near-IR fluor that is invisible to the naked eye (excitation/emission maximum 750/776 nm). It is used in in vivo imaging applications, as well as the Cy7.5 dye.

Sulfo–cyanine dyes bear one or two sulfo groups, rendering the Cy dye water-soluble, but tri- and quadri-sulfonated forms are available for even higher water solubility. PEGylation is another modification that confers hydrophilicity, not only to the dye but also to the labeled conjugate.

=== Nomenclature and structure ===
The Cy3 and Cy5 nomenclature was first proposed by Ernst, et al. in 1989, and is non-standard since it gives no hint of their chemical structures. In the original paper the number designated the count of the methines (as shown), and the side chains were unspecified. Due to this ambiguity various structures are designated Cy3 and Cy5 in the literature. The R groups do not have to be identical. In the dyes as used they are short aliphatic chains one or both of which ends in a highly reactive moiety such as N-hydroxysuccinimide or maleimide.

=== Alternatives ===
Many commercial analogues are available commercially.

=== Applications ===
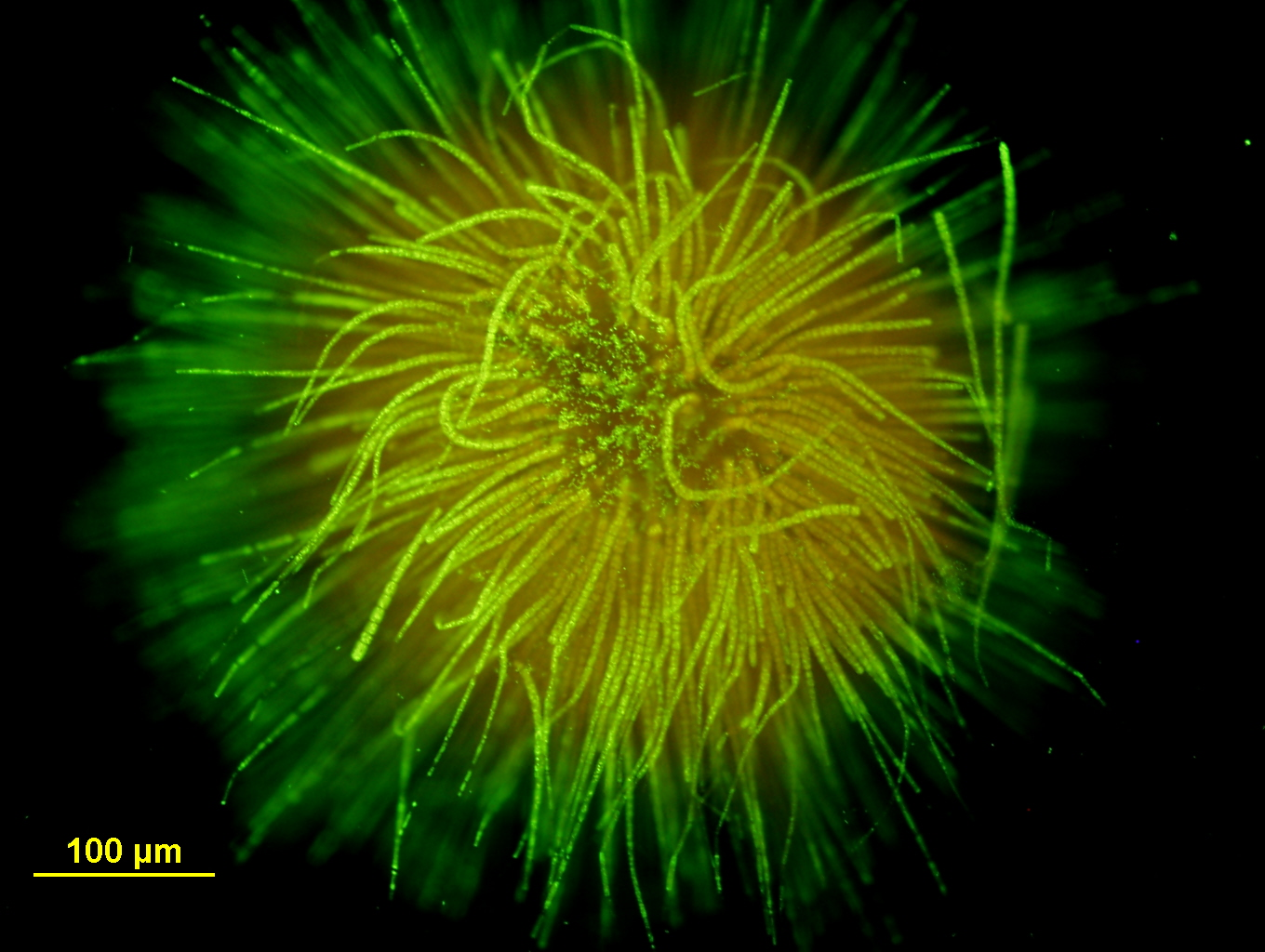
A cyanobacterium stained green with cyanine dye

Cyanine dyes are used to label proteins, antibodies, peptides, nucleic acid probes, and any kind of other biomolecules to be used in a variety of fluorescence detection techniques: flow cytometry, microscopy (mainly the visible range, but also UV and IR), microplate assays, microarrays, as well as "light-up probes," and in vivo imaging.

==== Nucleic acid labeling ====
In micorarray experiments DNA or RNA is labeled with either Cy3 or Cy5 that has been synthesized to carry an N-hydroxysuccinimidyl ester (NHS-ester) reactive group. Since NHS-esters react readily only with aliphatic amine groups, which nucleic acids lack, nucleotides have to be modified with aminoallyl groups. This is done through incorporating aminoallyl-modified nucleotides during synthesis reactions. A good ratio is a label every 60 bases such that the labels are not too close to each other, which would result in quenching effects.

==== Protein labeling ====
For protein labeling, Cy3 and Cy5 dyes sometimes bear a succinimidyl group to react with amines, or a maleimide group to react with a sulfhydryl group of cysteine residues.

Cy5 is sensitive to its electronic environment. Changes in the conformation of the protein it is attached to will produce either enhancement or quenching of the emission. The rate of this change can be measured to determine enzyme kinetic parameters. The dyes can be used for similar purposes in FRET experiments.

Cy3 and Cy5 are used in proteomics experiments so that samples from two sources can be mixed and run together through the separation process. This eliminates variations due to differing experimental conditions that are inevitable if the samples were run separately. These variations make it extremely difficult, if not impossible, to use computers to automate the acquisition of the data after the separation is complete. Using these dyes makes the automation trivial.

== Etymology ==
The word cyanin is from the English word "cyan", which conventionally means a shade of blue-green (close to "aqua") and is derived from the Greek κυάνεος/κυανοῦς kyaneos/kyanous which means a somewhat different color: "dark blue".
