= List of former toponyms in Grevena Prefecture =

Some inhabited places in Grevena Prefecture of Greece were previously known by different names. Some of the name forms are identifiably of Greek origin, others of Slavic, yet others of Turkish or more obscure origins.

Former name(s)	Current official name other Greek names	Prefecture	Geographic Coordinates	Citation	Population (2001)	Other
Avdela	Avdella (Αβδέλλα)	Grevena	40°01′N 21°07′E	p. 107	448	
Agalush, Angelush (Агалуш, Ангелуш)	Agalea (Αγαλαίοι)	Grevena	40°02′N 21°37′E	p. 107	72	
Sveti Gorgi (Агиос Георгиос)	Agios Georgios (Άγιος Γεώργιος)	Grevena	39°52′N 21°46′E	p. 107	824	
Gorno Vidishte (Горно Видище)	Ano Ekklisia (Άνω Εκκλησία)	Grevena	40°09′N 21°16′E	p. 108	79	
Arap (Арап)	Dimitra, Arapis (Δήμητρα, Αράπις)	Grevena	39°57′N 21°40′E	p. 108	712	
Baltino, Boltino (Балтино, Болтино)	Kallithea, Katafygion (Καλλιθέα, Καταφύγιον)	Grevena	39°52′N 21°21′E	p. 108	169	
Bishovo (Бишово)	Kyparissi, Lysvaton (Κυπαρίσσιον, Κυπαρίσσι, Λύσβατον)	Grevena	40°09′N 21°14′E	p. 109	111	
Bozovo (Бозово)	Prionia (Πριόνια)	Grevena	39°53′N 21°22′E	p. 109	166	
Bura (Бура)	Doxaras (Δοξαράς)	Grevena	40°04′N 21°24′E	p. 109	212	
Vantsiko, Vansko (Ванцико, Ванско)	Kydonies, Kydonia (Κυδωνίες, Κυδωνίαι)	Grevena	40°11′N 21°17′E	p. 109; GeoNames	163	
Varishte, Vartsa (Варище, Варца)	Varis (Βάρης)	Grevena	40°08′N 21°40′E	p. 109; GeoNames	76	
Ventsi, Ventsiya (Венци, Венция)	Kentro (Κέντρον)	Grevena	40°01′N 21°37′E	p. 110	114	
Vidishte, Vivisti (Видище, Вивисти)	Ekklisia (Εκκλησία)	Grevena	40°09′N 21°16′E	p. 110	45	
Vilya, Velya (Виля, Веля)	Oropedio (Οροπέδιο, Οροπέδιον)	Grevena	40°07′N 21°19′E	p. 110	189	
Vich, Vitsa, Vicho (Вич, Вица, Вичо)	Lochmi (Λόχμη)	Grevena	40°10′N 21°23′E	p. 110	47	
Vodensko, Vudinsko (Воденско, Вудинско)	Polyneri, Polynerion, Vodentsiko (Πολυνέρι, Πολυνέριον, Βοδετσικό)	Grevena	40°03′N 21°12′E	p. 110	221	
Vravonishta (Вравонища)	Kalirachi (Καληράχη)	Grevena	40°05′N 21°17′E	p. 111	222	
Varbovo, Vurbovo (Върбово, Вурбово)	Itea (Ιτέα)	Grevena	40°04′N 21°37′E	p. 111	242	
Vreashtino, Vrashen (Вреаштино, Врашен)	Anavryta, Vrastinon, Vraston (Αναβρυτά, Βράστινον, Βραστόν)	Grevena	40°04′N 21°17′E	p. 111	43	
Goblaraki (Гоблараки)	Mikro (Μικρόν)	Grevena	39°58′N 21°36′E	p. 112; GeoNames		
Goblari, Koblar (Гоблари, Коблар)	Myrsina (Μυρσίνα)	Grevena	40°08′N 21°29′E	p. 112	266	
Golemo Serin (Големо Серин)	Megalo Seirini, Mega Sirinion (Μέγα Σειρήνιο, Μέγα Σειρήνι, Μέγα Σειρήνιον)	Grevena	40°07′N 21°25′E	p. 112	696	
Gostum, Gustam (Гостум, Густам)	Poros (Πόρος)	Grevena	40°07′N 21°32′E	p. 112	148	
Greben (Гребен)	Grevena (Γρεβενά)	Grevena	40°05′N 21°25′E	p. 112	10,177	Capital of prefecture; Aromanian: Grebini
Greus, Greausa (Греус, Греауса)	Anoixi, Anoixis, Gria (Άνοιξη, Άνοιξις, Γρία)	Grevena	39°55′N 21°35′E	p. 113	151	
Grintades, Kritades (Гринтадес, Критадес)	Aimilianos (Αιμιλιανός)	Grevena	39°58′N 21°26′E	p. 113	61	
Gournaki	Neochori, Neochorion, Gournakion (Νεοχώρι, Νεοχώριον, Γουρνάκιον)	Grevena	40°00′N 21°41′E	p. 113	138	
Delvino, Delnon (Делвино, Делнон)	Prosvorro, Prosvoron (Πρόσβορρο, Πρόσβορον)	Grevena	40°06′N 21°12′E	p. 113	186	
Dimenitsa, Diminitsa (Дименица, Диминица)	Karpero, Karperon (Καρπερό, Καρπερόν)	Grevena	39°57′N 21°37′E	p. 114	745	
Dobratovo (Добратово)	Vatolakkos (Βατόλακκος)	Grevena	40°10′N 21°29′E	p. 114	386	
Dovrani, Dobrani (Доврани, Добрани)	Elatos (Έλατος)	Grevena	40°05′N 21°21′E	p. 114; GeoNames	233	
Duvrunishta, Dervenishta (Дуврунища, Дервенища)	Klimataki, Klimatakion (Κληματάκι, Κληματάκιον)	Grevena	40°12′N 21°22′E	p. 115	156	
Dusko, Dontsiko (Дуско, Донцико)	Dotsiko, Dontsikon (Δοτσικό, Δοντσικόν)	Grevena	40°08′N 21°08′E	p. 115	187	
Zhitovo, Sitovo (Житово, Ситово)	Sitaras (Σιταράς)	Grevena	39°57′N 21°24′E	p. 116	84	
Zalovo (Залово)	Trikomo, Trikomon (Τρίκωμο, Τρίκωμον)	Grevena	39°59′N 21°19′E	p. 116	201	
Zapandei (Запандеи)	Lagkadia (Λαγκαδιά)	Grevena	39°56′N 21°26′E	p. 116		
Zemnyach, Zimnyatsi (Земяч, Зимяци)	Paliouria (Παλιουριά)	Grevena	39°58′N 21°44′E	p. 116	412	
Zigost, Zigosti (Зигост, Зигости)	Mesolakkos (Μεσόλακκος)	Grevena	40°05′N 21°31′E	p. 116; GeoNames	88	
Kalamach, Kalamitsa (Каламач, Каламица)	Kalamitsi, Kalamitsion (Καλαμίτσι, Καλαμίτσιον)	Grevena	40°05′N 21°28′E	p. 117	58	
Kolokitaki (Колокитаки)	Lefkaki, Kolokithanion (Λευκάκιον, Κολοκυθάκιον)	Grevena	40°07′N 21°37′E	p. 118		
Konsko, Kusko (Конско, Куско)	Elefthero (Ελεύθερο, Ελεύθερον)	Grevena	40°09′N 21°25′E	p. 118	81	
Kopriva (Коприва)	Knidi (Κνίδη)	Grevena	40°06′N 21°36′E	p. 118; GeoNames	443	
Koskondi, Konokisti (Косконди, Конокисти)	Taxiarchis, Kosku (Ταξιάρχης, Κοσκού)	Grevena	40°11′N 21°32′E	p. 119	408	
Krivtsi (Кривци)	Kivotos (Κιβωτός)	Grevena	40°13′N 21°27′E	p. 119	708	
Kritapak (Критапакь)	Kritharakia (Κριθαράκια)	Grevena	40°11′N 21°22′E	p. 119	15	
Labanitsa (Лабаница)	Mikrolivado (Μικρολίβαδο, Μικρολίβαδον)	Grevena	39°57′N 21°15′E	p. 120	96	
Libinovo (Либиново)	Diakos (Διάκος)	Grevena	39°55′N 21°27′E	p. 120		
Lipintsi, Lepenitsa (Липинци, Лепеница)	Perivolaki (Περιβολάκι, Περιβολάκιον)	Grevena	40°02′N 21°14′E	p. 121	30	
Lochishno, Lunchishno (Лочишно, Лунчишно)	Lagkadakia (Λαγκαδάκια)	Grevena	40°08′N 21°32′E	p. 121		
Lubinishta (Лубинища)	Valanion (Βαλάνιον)	Grevena	39°52′N 21°41′E	p. 121		
Luntsi, Lunch (Лунци, Лунч)	Kalloni (Καλλονή)	Grevena	40°09′N 21°12′E	p. 121	171	
Mavran, Mavronishta (Мавран, Мавронища)	Mavranaioi (Μαυραναίοι)	Grevena	40°02′N 21°21′E	p. 122	229	
Mager (Магер)	Dasyllio, Mageron (Δασύλλιο, Δασύλλιον, Μαγέρον)	Grevena	40°10′N 21°11′E	p. 122	43	
Malo Serin (Мало Серин)	Mikro Seirini, Apano Sirini (Μικρόν Σειρήνιον, Απάνω Σειρήνι)	Grevena	40°08′N 21°26′E	p. 122	162	
Manastir Zapurta (Манастир Запурта)	Agios Nikanoros Monastery (Μονή Αγίου Νικάνορος, Μονή Ζαπούρτα, Μονή Οσίου Νικάνορος)	Grevena	39°58′N 21°46′E	p. 122	3	
Manash (Манаш)	Anthrakia, Manes (Ανθρακιά, Μάνες)	Grevena	39°56′N 21°31′E	p. 123	124	
Mesolovo, Mesolur (Месолово, Месолур)	Mesolouri (Μεσολούρι, Μεσολούριον)	Grevena	40°07′N 21°09′E	p. 123	139	
Nasinokos (Насинокос)	Nisi, Nision (Νησί, Νησίον)	Grevena	40°00′N 21°36′E	p. 124	120	
Paleokopriva (Палеокоприва)	Palaioknidi (Παλαιοκνίδη)	Grevena	40°07′N 21°35′E	p. 124		
Paleokopriya	Dasaki (Δασάκι, Δασάκιον)	Grevena	40°12′N 21°21′E	p. 124	19	
Paleokhori	Stavros (Σταυρός)	Grevena	40°01′N 21°19′E	p. 125	77	
Pesko, Peskavo (Песко, Пескаво)	Pistiko, Pistikon, Pisko (Πιστικό, Πιστικόν, Πισκό)	Grevena	40°05′N 21°34′E	p. 126	80	
Pikrovenitsa, Prevenitsa (Пикровеница, Превеница)	Amygdalies (Αμυγδαλιές, Αμυγδαλέαι)	Grevena	40°10′N 21°22′E	p. 126	714	
Pinyari (Пиняри)	Elafion (Ελάφιον)	Grevena	39°59′N 21°34′E	p. 127		
Pichugja (Пичуѓа)	Dasochori (Δασοχώρι)	Grevena	39°53′N 21°49′E	p. 127	205	
Plyasa, Plisiya (Пляcа, Плисия)	Melissi, Plesia (Μελίσσι, Μελίσσιον, Πλέσια)	Grevena	39°58′N 21°30′E	p. 127	0	
Radovishte (Радовище)	Rodia, Radovistion (Ροδιά, Ραδοβίστιον)	Grevena	40°09′N 21°20′E	p. 127	383	
Radunishta, Radosinishta (Радунища, Радосинища)	Megaro (Μέγαρον)	Grevena	40°07′N 21°17′E	p. 128	561	
Ratsi (Раци)	Agapi (Αγάπη)	Grevena	40°04′N 21°34′E	p. 128	58	
Ryahovo (Ряхово)	Paroreio (Παρόρειο, Παρόρειον)	Grevena	40°00′N 21°18′E	p. 128	33	
Santovishta (Сантовища)	Mikrokleisoura (Μικροκλεισούρα)	Grevena	40°09′N 21°33′E	p. 129	133	
Selisma (Селисма)	Diasellaki (Διασελλάκιον)	Grevena	39°53′N 21°43′E	p. 129	8	
Sinitsa, Slenitsa (Синица, Сленица)	Trifylli (Τριφύλλι, Τριφύλλιον)	Grevena	39°54′N 21°39′E	p. 129	184	
Snikhovo (Снихово)	Despotis (Δεσπότης)	Grevena	40°01′N 21°26′E	p. 130	36	
Spata	Polydendro (Πολύδενδρο, Πολύδενδρον)	Grevena	40°13′N 21°29′E	p. 130; GeoNames	250	
Stihazi, Stizyahi (Стихази, Стизяхи)	Aidonia (Αηδόνια)	Grevena	40°12′N 21°19′E	p. 131	136	
Suvin, Svolyani (Сувин, Своляни)	Kokkinia, Sumpino (Κοκκινιά, Σούμπινο)	Grevena	40°13′N 21°29′E	p. 131	229	
Tista (Тиста)	Zakas (Ζάκας)	Grevena	40°02′N 21°17′E	p. 131; GeoNames	341	
Torishte, Torishta (Ториште, Торища)	Pontini (Ποντινή)	Grevena	40°04′N 21°41′E	p. 131	322	
Trivesht, Trivish (Тривешт, Тривиш)	Syndendro (Σύνδενδρο, Σύνδενδρον)	Grevena	40°08′N 21°21′E	p. 132	345	
Tritsko, Tritsiko (Трицко, Трицико)	Trikorfo (Τρίκορφο, Τρίκορφον)	Grevena	40°09′N 21°13′E	p. 132	65	
Tuz, Tost (Туз, Тост)	Alatopetra (Αλατόπετρα)	Grevena	40°04′N 21°13′E	p. 132	140	
Turye (Турйе)	Kranea (Κρανέα)	Grevena	39°54′N 21°17′E	p. 132	589	
Turyuki, Toronik (Турюки, Тороник)	Panagia, Tournikion (Παναγία, Τουρνίκιον)	Grevena	39°58′N 21°44′E	p. 133	116	
Fil (Фил)	Felli (Φελλίο, Φελλίον, Φιλί)	Grevena	40°02′N 21°32′E	p. 133	289	
Filishta (Филища)	Filippaioi (Φιλιππαίοι)	Grevena	40°05′N 21°09′E	p. 133	206	
Khisar (Хисар)	Kastro, Kastron (Κάστρο, Κάστρον)	Grevena	40°06′N 21°18′E	p. 133	29	
Kholenishta (Холенища)	Diporo (Δίπορο, Δίπορον)	Grevena	40°00′N 21°39′E	p. 133	119	
Tsuryaka (Цуряка)	Aetia (Αετιά)	Grevena	40°05′N 21°11′E	p. 134	48	
Chaturnyja (Чатурня)	Trikokkia, Tsapournia (Τρικοκκιά, Τσαπουρνιά)	Grevena	39°53′N 21°37′E	p. 134	305	
Chirak (Чирак)	Agios Kosmas, Tsiraki (Άγιος Κοσμάς, Τσιράκι)	Grevena	40°09′N 21°15′E	p. 134	68	
Chuka	Gilofos (Γήλοφος)	Grevena	39°51′N 21°47′E	p. 134	141	
Churkhli, Zurlukhli, Dzhurkhli (Чурхли, Зурлухли, Джурхли)	Agios Georgios (Άγιος Γεώργιος)	Grevena	40°12′N 21°24′E	p. 135	10	
Shargan (Шарган)	Panorama, Sarganaia (Πανόραμα, Σαργκαναίοι)	Grevena	40°03′N 21°11′E	p. 135	126	
