= 1995 Kozani–Grevena earthquake =

Large earthquake in Greece

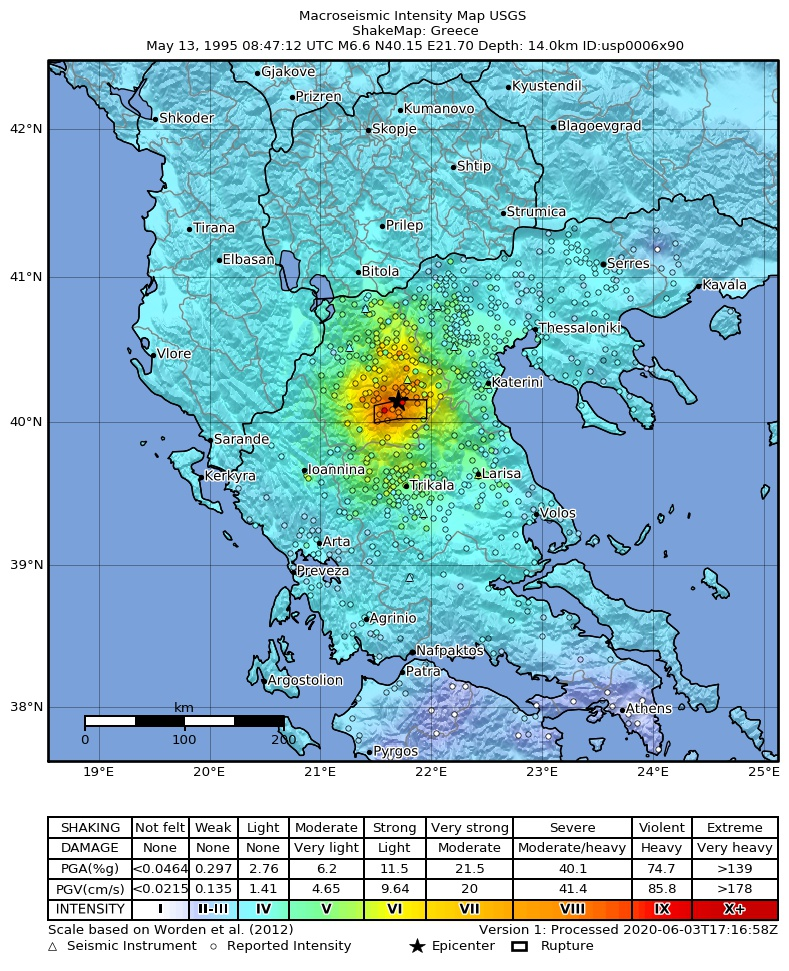

- Location within Greece
- UTC time: 1995-05-13 08:47:12
- ISC event: 103422
- USGS-ANSS: ComCat
- Local date: 13 May 1995
- Local time: 11:47:12 EEST
- Magnitude: 6.5-6.6 M_{w} 6.6 M_{s}
- Depth: 14 km (9 mi)
- Epicenter: 40.10°N 21.67°E
- Fault: Dheskati, Paleochori and Servia faults
- Type: Normal
- Areas affected: Greece
- Total damage: $450 million (1995 USD)
- Max. intensity: MMI X (Extreme)
- Peak acceleration: 0.75 g
- Landslides: Extensive amounts
- Aftershocks: 468 in 1 month
- Casualties: 25 injured

The 1995 Kozani–Grevena earthquake was a large earthquake that occurred on May 13, 1995, in the region of Western Macedonia, Greece. With a magnitude of 6.6 on the moment magnitude scale, this earthquake caused locally significant damage to villages and towns in the regions of Kozani and Grevena. 25 people were injured and monetary damages of $450 million were caused as a result of the earthquake.

The earthquake occurred on an area which was thought to have low seismic risk since no active faults were known to exist there. Following multiple years of research of the area concluded that the earthquake was associated with multiple faults southwest of the Polyfytos Lake.

== Tectonic setting ==
The country of Greece as well as the Aegean Region of Turkey are the most seismically active regions of Europe and the Mediterranean. It is a site where the Alpine-Himalayan Belt goes through. The geographical region consist of multiple main geologic features, including the Hellenic Trench, the Hellenic arc and the Mediterranean Ridge, which are all the sites of the collision between the African Plate and the Aegean Plate, where the African Plate lithosphere subducts under the Aegean Plate. Despite this convergent plate collision being the cause of multiple large quakes in recent history, the 1995 Kozani–Grevena earthquake was not caused by this.

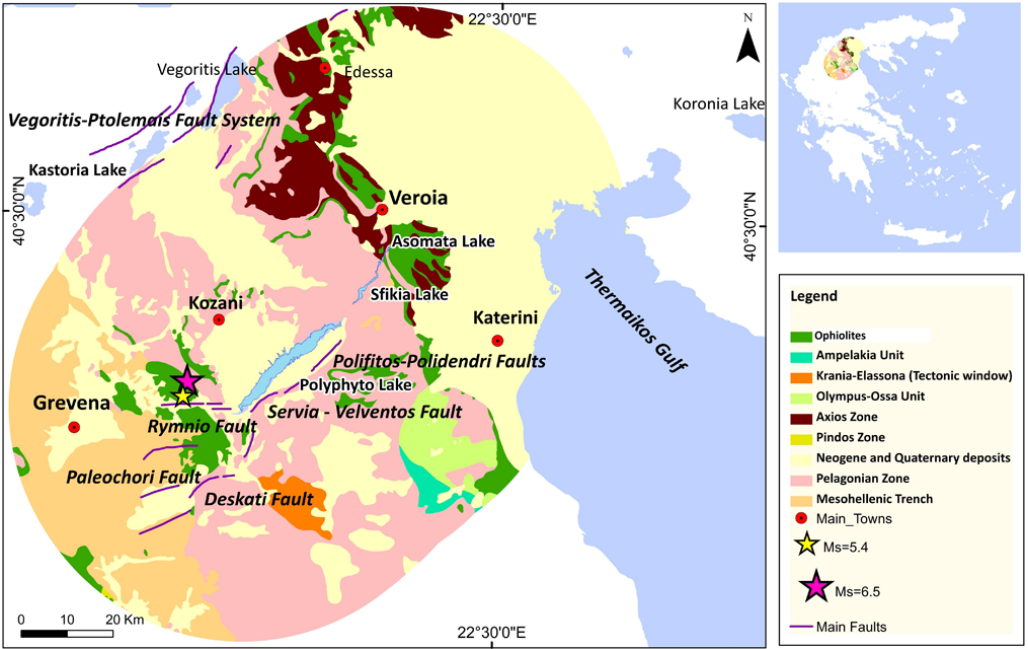
A geologic map of the Kozani-Grevena region including fault lines. The purple star is the 1995 earthquake, the yellow star is the 1984 earthquake.

Instead, the earthquake is related to a province of extensional tectonics surrounded by compressional zones which form structures like grabens in the region. More specifically, related to the earthquake is the Florina-Vegoritis-Ptolemais Graben, which is a large Cenozoic basin extending from Bitola of North Macedonia all the way to the Kozani area. This basin is filled with Neogene sediment which covers the Paleozoic metamorphic rocks and Mesozoic limestones below it, which make up the basement of the graben. Thrust sheet occurrences from the west of the basin and anticline formations on the east of the basin make up the folding phases of this graben which occurred during the Tertiary era. Running through the basin can be found many southwest–northeast directed lengthy normal faults which are hard to locate since they're covered by Neogene-Quaternary sediments. Fault plane analysis confirmed that southeast–northwest directed faults (related to the graben) had a focal mechanism of strike-slip meanwhile southwest–northeast faults which run through the basin have a focal mechanism of normal faulting.

=== Local geology ===
Shortly after the earthquake occurred, no surface rupture was found therefore the fault plane couldn't be calculated. However the closest known fault to the earthquake, the Servia Fault, was known to dip northwestward as well as the fault plane therefore it was associated with the Servia Fault. This was later confirmed by the series of aftershocks recorded by a seismic network equipped with GPS. Later, the earthquake was more complex than thought and was apparently associated with other faults nearby including the Dheskati Fault and the Paleohori Fault as a result of aligning with the earthquake and the aftershock sequence.

== Earthquake ==
The M_{w} 6.6 earthquake struck at 08:47:12 GMT on 13 May 1995, in Northwestern Macedonia, Greece, at a depth of 14 km (9 mi) along the normal Paleohori Fault. The earthquake had a MMI of X (Extreme). The highest intensity of X was recorded in the state of Grevena in the village of Knidi. Furthermore, IX was recorded in the Kalamitsi and Varis towns and VIII was recorded in the villages of Taxiarchis, Grevena, Kokkinia, Grevena, Vatolakkos, Grevena, Poros, Grevena, Lankadakia, Kalochi, Pyloroi and Pontini. In major cities in other states and countries, the earthquakes were felt as well with intensities of IV in Thessaloniki and III in Tirana and Podgorica.

=== Focal mechanism ===
The moment tensor solution determined from Harvard CMT (now called GCMT) is a pure normal faulting solution with a depth of 16 km (10 mi) trending northeast–southwest and dipping towards the northwest at an angle of 31 degrees. A different paper, using a waveform modelling system, obtained a focal mechanism with a depth of 11 km (7 mi), trending northeast–southwest with a dipping angle of 41 degrees to the northwest. The seismic moment value given by the same paper is 6.2 x 10^18 N-m, compared to the 7.6 x 10^18 N-m value given by the Harvard CMT.

=== Ground motion ===
Ground motion values of the earthquake were observed in real-time by KOZ, a seismic station and a nearby network of accelerometers deployed by the Public Power Corporation near the Polyfytos Dam and the Sfikia Dam which were located 50 km within the epicenter's radius. The KOZ station observed 0.20 g meanwhile the Polyfytos and Sfikia Dam accelerometers observed 0.068 g at most.

In 2019, the ground motion values for the earthquake were simulated using hypothetical seismic stations and a stochastic modeling approach to compute the synthetic ground motion for the event. As a result, PGA (peak ground acceleration) values of 0.75 g at most was computed. This technique was used on other earthquakes before, including the 2010 Haiti earthquake and the 1995 Aigio earthquake.

== Impact ==
As a result of the earthquake, many houses, schools, historic churches were destroyed and road networks along with water drillings. No deaths were reported however roughly 7,000 people were left homeless, leaving the social life among villages disrupted. Extensive amounts of landslides, rockfalls and surface ruptures were recorded. Liquefaction was widespread, where a 2 km (1.2 miles) wide zone at the southern shore of Polyfytos Dam near the village of Rymnio. Multiple sand and mud volcanoes were observed in this area with an NW-SE orientation, as well as some with a NE-SW direction which coincides with the Servia Fault strike. As a result, 25 people were injured and a monetary damage of $450 million was caused.

== Response ==
=== Prediction controversy ===
In July 1993, a group called VAN (standing for the first letters of the last names of the creators) in Greece installed an electric and magnetic station nearby their base in Ioannina. This station, for the next 2 years until April 19 of 1995, produced "anomalous signals", which were interpreted as "seismic electric signals" by the VAN group. VAN claimed that these signals were the precursor to the 1995 Kozani–Grevena earthquake; claiming electric energy is related to stress among faults underground.

These claims stirred controversy in the world of seismology, as the group called out geologists who disputed the claim. The government was ready to support the VAN method until seismologists preferred this method was rather unsound. Outside of seismologists in Greece, Xavier Le Pichon of ENS Paris suggested that the VAN group cannot claim success on barely any observations. David Booth of the British Geological Survey, speaking on behalf of his knowledge, said that the prediction windows were too vague and loose and the predictions were not very accurate in terms of time and magnitude.

The VAN method did not only get negative response, but it was also warmly approached by other institutions including the JMA of Japan which was ready to fund a budget for the VAN project to operate in Japan. Another warm approach included Sir James Lighthill of UCL, which aimed to provide an evaluation of the method.

For the 1995 Kozani earthquake, a paper in 1996 analyzing the signals leading to the earthquake revealed that the "seismic electric signals" observed by the stations were actually signals from a local industrial source where the station was located in.

== See also ==
- 1995 Aigio earthquake
- List of earthquakes in Greece
