= Greco-Turkish War (1897) =

Conflict over the status of Crete

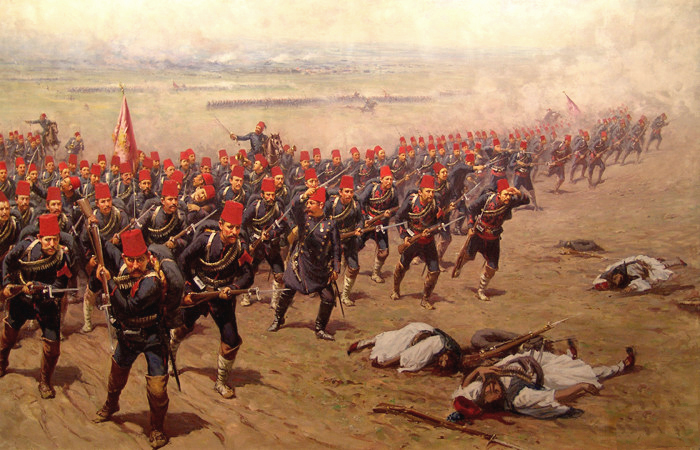
- Painting depicting the Battle of Domokos by Fausto Zonaro
Date	18 April – 20 May 1897 (32 days)
Location	Mainland Greece (mainly Epirus and Thessaly) and Crete
Result	Ottoman victory
Territorial changes	Small parts of Thessaly ceded to the Ottoman Empire; Cretan State established through the intervention of the great powers of Europe

Belligerents
Ottoman Empire; Albanian regulars and volunteers	(Kingdom of Greece) Greece; (Kingdom of Italy) Italian volunteers; (Armenia) Armenian volunteers; Philhellenic Legion (Note: The Philhellenic Legion included British, French, German, Italian, Danish, Polish, Finnish and other non-Greek volunteers. In total, people of 16 different nationalities became part of the Philhellenic Legion.)

Commanders and leaders
Abdul Hamid II; Edhem Pasha; Ahmed Hifzi Pasha; Hasan Izzet Pasha; Ahmed Niyazi Bey; Hasan Rami Pasha	(Kingdom of Greece) Crown Prince Constantine (Kingdom of Greece) Konstantinos Sapountzakis (Kingdom of Greece) Thrasyvoulos Manos (Kingdom of Italy) Ricciotti Garibaldi

Strength
120,000 infantry 1,300 cavalry 210 guns	(Kingdom of Greece) 75,000–90,000 infantry (Kingdom of Greece) 500 cavalry (Kingdom of Italy) 2,000 Italian volunteers (Armenia) 600 Armenian volunteers 150 Philhellenic volunteers (Kingdom of Greece) 136 guns

Casualties and losses
999–1,300 killed 2,064–2,697 wounded	(Kingdom of Greece) 700–832 killed (Kingdom of Greece) 2,481 wounded (Kingdom of Greece) 253 prisoners

The Greco-Turkish War of 1897 or the Ottoman-Greek War of 1897 was fought between the Kingdom of Greece and the Ottoman Empire. Its immediate cause involved the ongoing Cretan Revolt and the status of the Ottoman province of Crete, whose Greek-majority population had long desired union with Greece. Despite the Ottoman victory on the field, an autonomous Cretan State under Ottoman suzerainty was established the following year (as a result of the intervention of the Great Powers after the war), with Prince George of Greece and Denmark as its first High Commissioner.

The war put the military and political personnel of Greece to test in an official open war for the first time since the Greek War of Independence in 1821. For the Ottoman Empire, this was also the first war-effort to test a re-organized military system. The Ottoman army operated under the guidance of a German military mission led (1883–1895) by Colmar Freiherr von der Goltz, who had reorganized the Ottoman military after its defeat in the Russo-Turkish War of 1877–1878.

The conflict proved that Greece was wholly unprepared for war. Plans, fortifications and weapons were non-existent, the mass of the officer corps was unsuited to its tasks, and training was inadequate. As a result, the numerically superior, better-organized, -equipped, and -led Ottoman forces, heavily composed of Albanian troop levies with combat experience, pushed the Greek forces south out of Thessaly and threatened Athens, only to cease fighting when the Great Powers persuaded the Sultan to agree to an armistice. The war was the first to be filmed on camera, though the footage has since been lost.

== Background ==
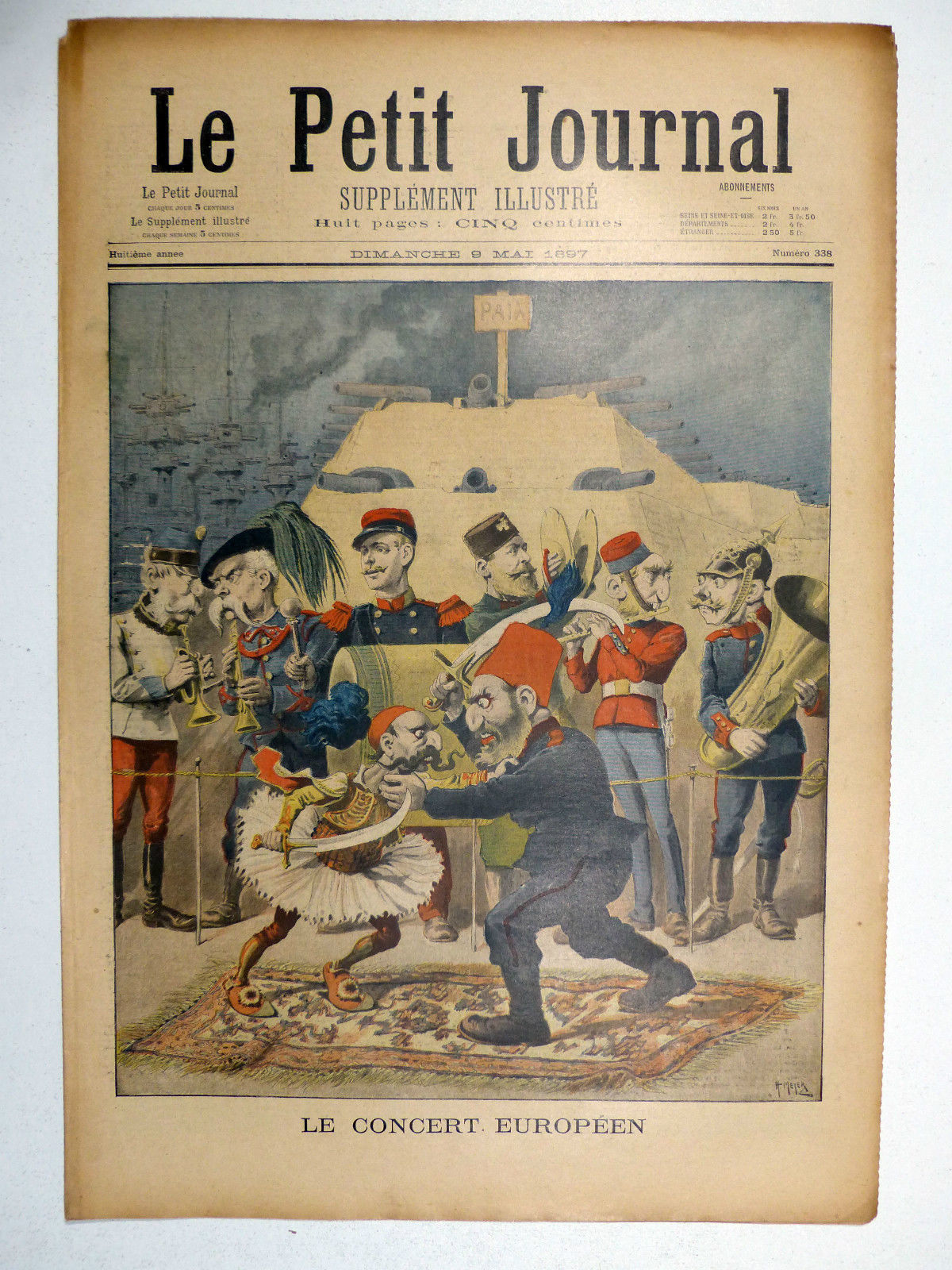
The Greco-Turkish war of 1897 on the cover of Le Petit Journal

In 1878 the Ottoman Empire, according to the provisions of the Congress of Berlin, signed the Pact of Halepa which entailed the implementation of the organic law of 1868, promised but never implemented by the Ottoman government, which was to give Crete a status of wide-ranging autonomy. The Ottoman commissioners, however, repeatedly ignored the convention, causing three successive rebellions in 1885, 1888 and 1889. In 1894 Sultan Abdul Hamid II re-appointed Alexander Karatheodori Pasha as governor of Crete, but Karatheodori's zeal for the implementation of the agreement was met with fury by the Muslim population of the island and led to renewed clashes between the Greek and Muslim communities there in 1896.

To quell the unrest, Ottoman military reinforcements arrived while Greek volunteers landed on the island to support the Greek population. At the same time the fleets of the Great Powers patrolled the Cretan waters, leading to further escalation. Nevertheless, an agreement was reached with the Sultan and the tensions receded. In January 1897 inter-communal violence broke out as both sides tried to consolidate their grip on power. The Christian district of Chania was set on fire and many fled to the foreign fleet anchored outside the city. A struggle for independence and union with Greece was declared by Cretan revolutionaries.

Greek prime minister Theodoros Deligiannis was subjected to fierce criticism by his adversary Dimitrios Rallis over his alleged inability to handle the issue. Continuous demonstrations in Athens accused King George I and the government of betrayal of the Cretan cause. The National Society, a nationalistic, militaristic organisation that had infiltrated all levels of the army and bureaucracy, pushed for immediate confrontation with the Ottomans.

=== Prelude to war ===
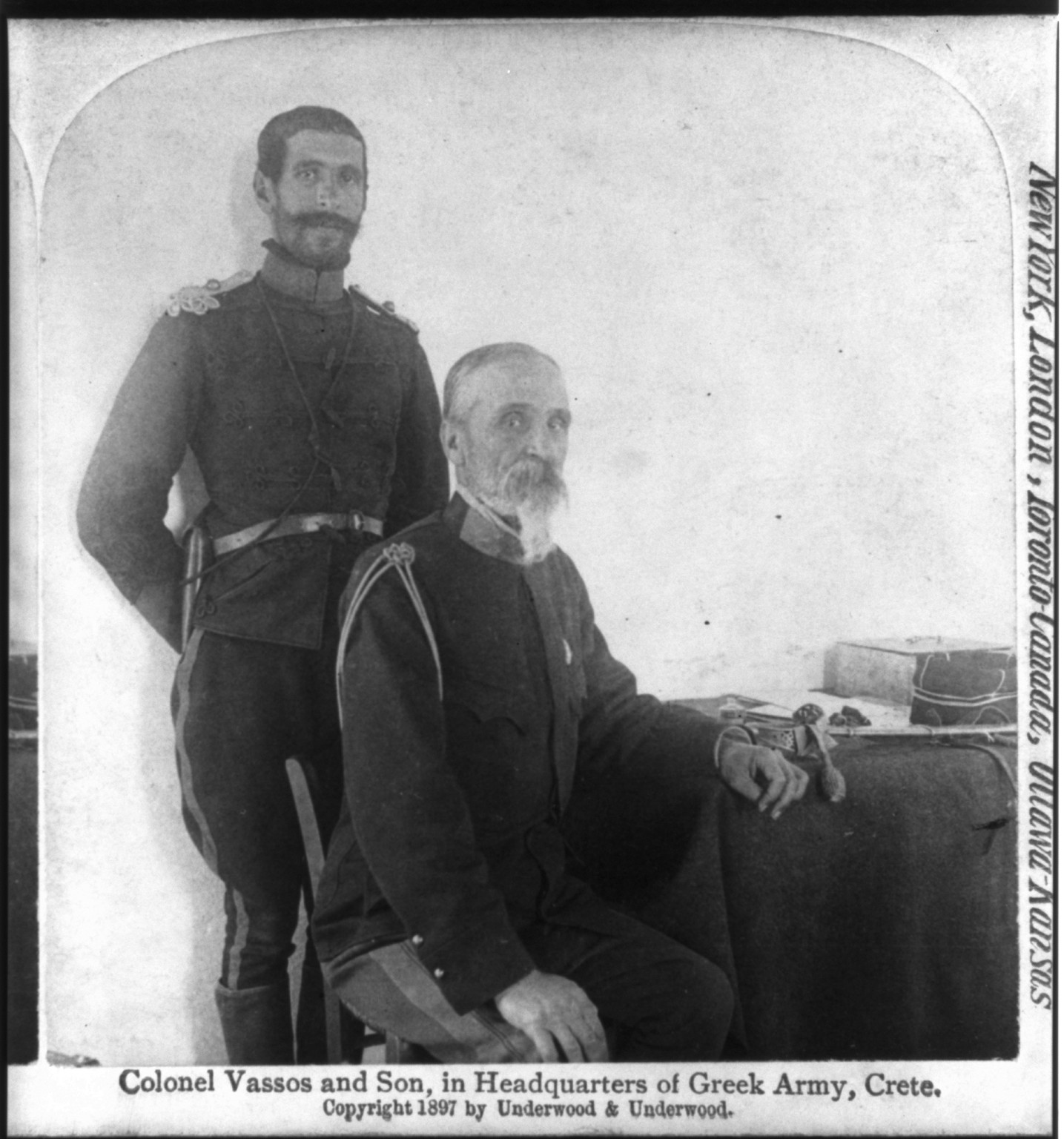
Colonel Timoleon Vassos and his son at the Greek headquarters in Crete

On 6 February 1897 (according to the modern Gregorian calendar; it was 25 January 1897 according to the Julian calendar then in use in Greece and the Ottoman Empire, which was 12 days behind the Gregorian during the 19th century) the first troopships, accompanied by the battleship Hydra, sailed for Crete. Before they arrived, a small Greek Navy squadron under the command of Prince George of Greece and Denmark appeared off Crete on 12 February (31 January Julian) with orders to support the Cretan insurgents and harass Ottoman shipping. Six Great Powers (Austria-Hungary, France, the German Empire, the Kingdom of Italy, the Russian Empire, and the United Kingdom) had already deployed warships to Cretan waters to form a naval "International Squadron" to intervene and to maintain peace on Crete, and they warned Prince George not to engage in hostilities; Prince George returned to Greece the next day. However, the troopships disembarked two battalions of the Greek Army under Colonel Timoleon Vassos at Platanias, west of Chania, on 14 February (2 February on the Julian calendar). Despite the guarantees given by the Great Powers on Ottoman sovereignty over the island, Vassos upon his arrival unilaterally proclaimed its union with Greece. The Powers reacted by demanding that Deligiannis immediately withdraw Greek forces from the island in exchange for a statute of autonomy.

The demand was rejected, and so on 19 February (7 February Julian) the first full-scale battle between Greeks and Ottomans occurred, when the Greek expeditionary force in Crete defeated a 4,000-strong Ottoman force at the Battle of Livadeia. Ordered to keep away from Crete's capital Canea (now Chania), Vassos accomplished little thereafter on Crete, but Cretan insurgents attacked Ottoman forces during February and March 1897. The warships of the International Squadron bombarded the insurgents to break up their attacks and put an international force of sailors and marines ashore to occupy Canea, and by the end of March major fighting on Crete came to an end, although the uprising continued.

=== Opposing forces ===
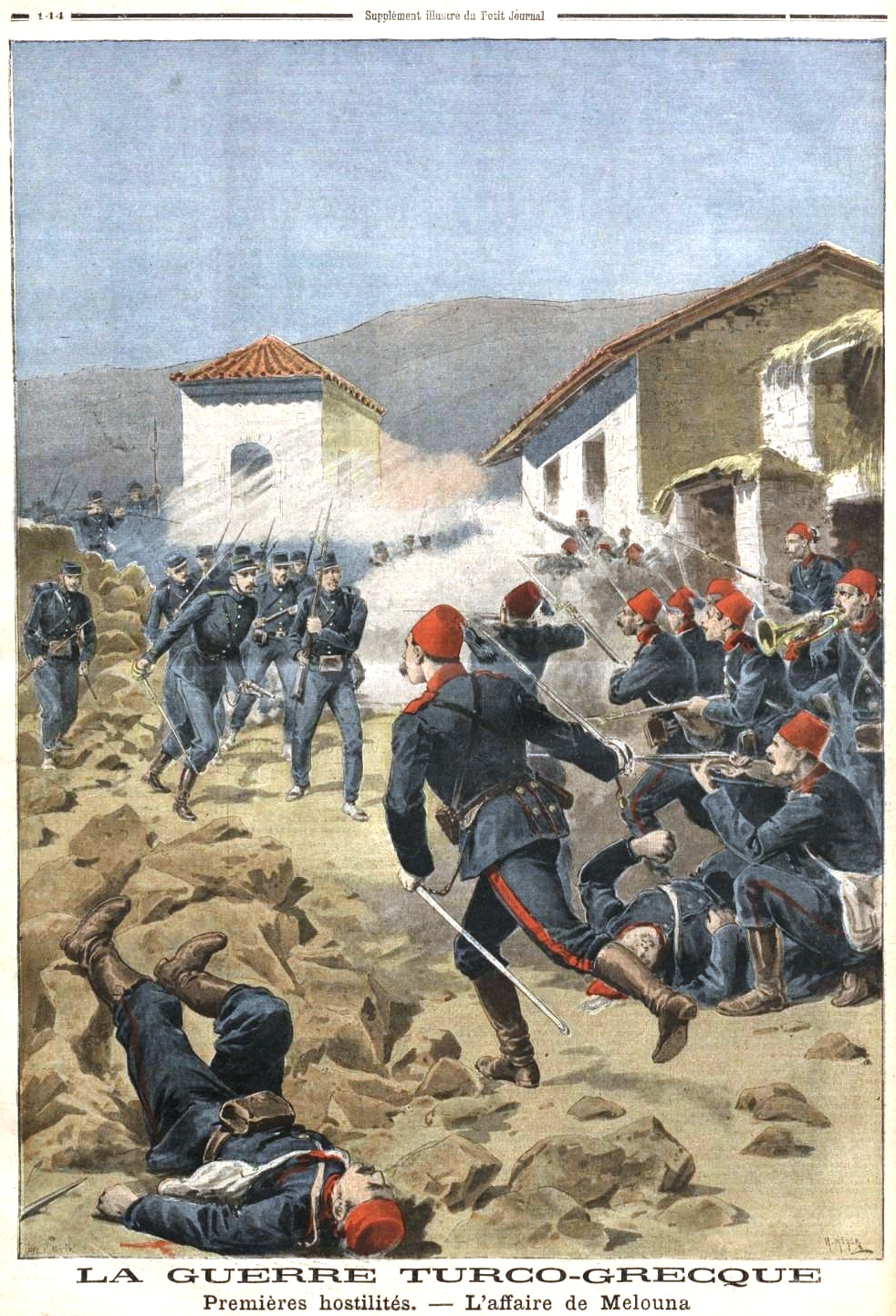
The first skirmishes at the Melouna border post, Le Petit Journal

Edhem Pasha, the Ottoman commander, with two aides-de-camp

The Greek army was made up of three divisions, with two of them taking positions in Thessaly and one in Arta, Epirus. Crown Prince Constantine was the only general in the army. He took command of the forces on 25 March. The Greek army in Thessaly consisted of 45,000 men, 500 cavalry, and 96 guns, while that of Epirus comprised 16,000 men and 40 guns.

The opposing Ottoman army comprised eight infantry divisions, largely consisting of Albanians, plus one cavalry division. On the Thessaly front, it consisted of 58,000 men, 1,300 cavalry, and 186 guns, while in Epirus it could field 26,000 men and 29 guns. Edhem Pasha had overall command of the Ottoman forces.

Apart from the obvious difference in numbers, the two sides had also significant differences in the quality of armaments and soldiers. The Ottoman army was already being equipped with its second generation of smokeless powder repeater rifles (Mauser Models 1890 and 1893), while the Greeks were equipped with the inferior single-shot Gras rifle. There was also the potential for a naval contest. In 1897 the Greek navy consisted of three small Hydra class battleships, one cruiser, the Miaoulis, and several older small ironclads and gunboats. The Greek ships bombarded Turkish fortifications and escorted troop transports, but there was no major naval battle during the war. The Ottoman fleet had seven battleships and ironclads at least as large as the Greek battleships, and although most of these were obsolete designs, the Osmaniye class had been rebuilt and modernized. The Ottoman navy also had several smaller ironclads, two unprotected cruisers and smaller ships including torpedo craft. The Ottoman fleet had not been maintained, perhaps due to the Sultan's fear of a strong navy becoming a power base for plots against the government, and in 1897 when called into action most of the ships were in poor condition and could not contest control of the sea beyond the Dardanelles.

== War ==
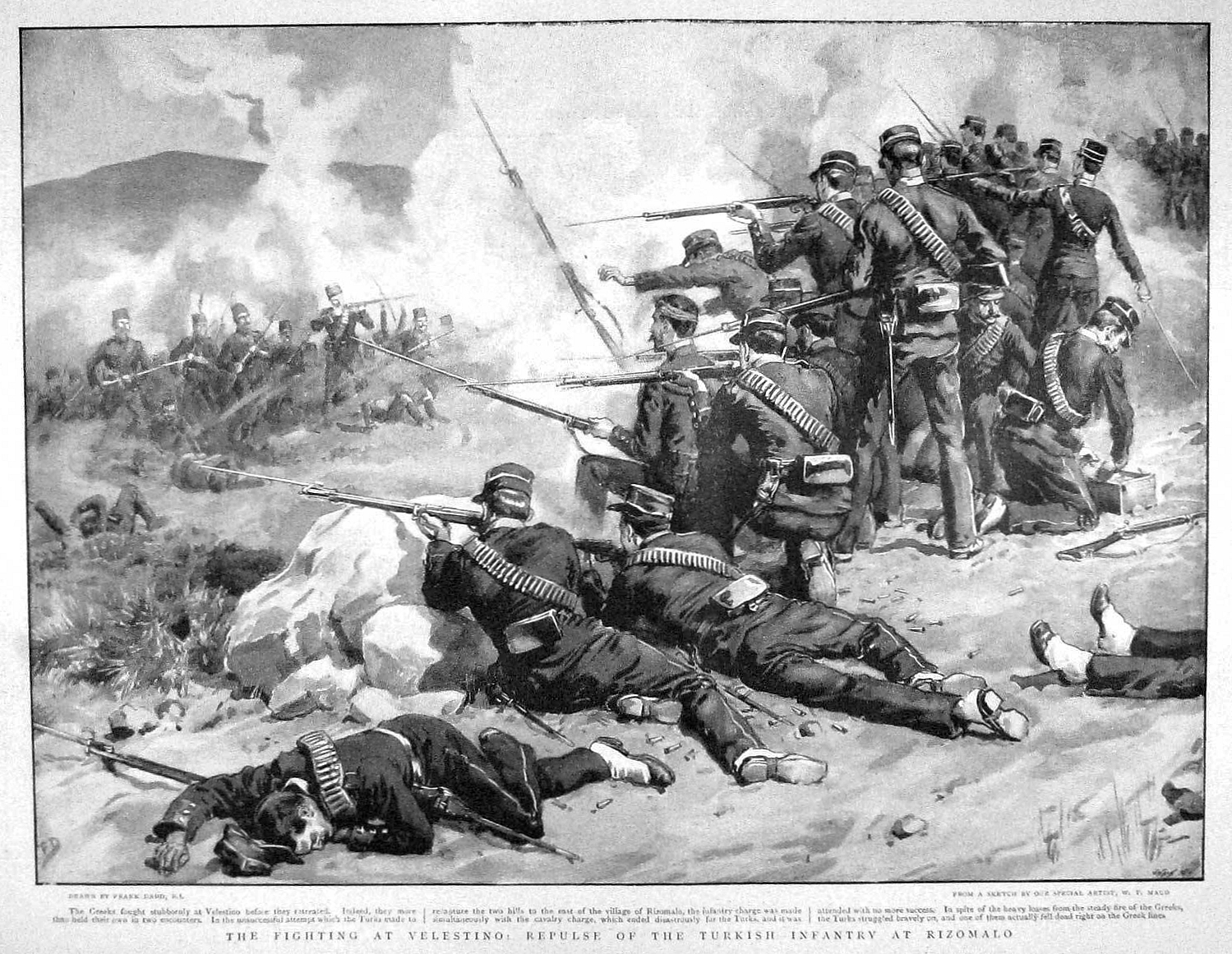
Firefight between Greeks and Turks at Rizomylos, during the Battle of Velestino

On 24th March, about 2,600 irregulars crossed the Greek border into Ottoman Macedonia in order to provoke disarray behind enemy lines by rousing locals against Ottoman administration. As a result, on 6 April Edhem Pasha mobilised his forces. His plan was to surround Greek forces and by using river Pineios as a natural barrier to push them back to central Greece. Nevertheless, his rear forces were halted while the center of his formation gained ground, altering his initial plans. The Greek plan called for a wider open field combat, which ultimately would cost heavy casualties against an already superior opponent. There was no serious force left to prevent the Ottoman Army from entering the Greek capital, Athens. Halil Rifat Pasha, asked Abdul Hamid for permission to enter Athens. In agreement with the Great powers, the Russian Tsar, Nicholas II, telegraphed Abdul Hamid himself and demanded that the war be stopped. On 19 May, the Ottoman army stopped its advance. On 20 May 1897, a ceasefire went into effect.

=== Thessalian front ===
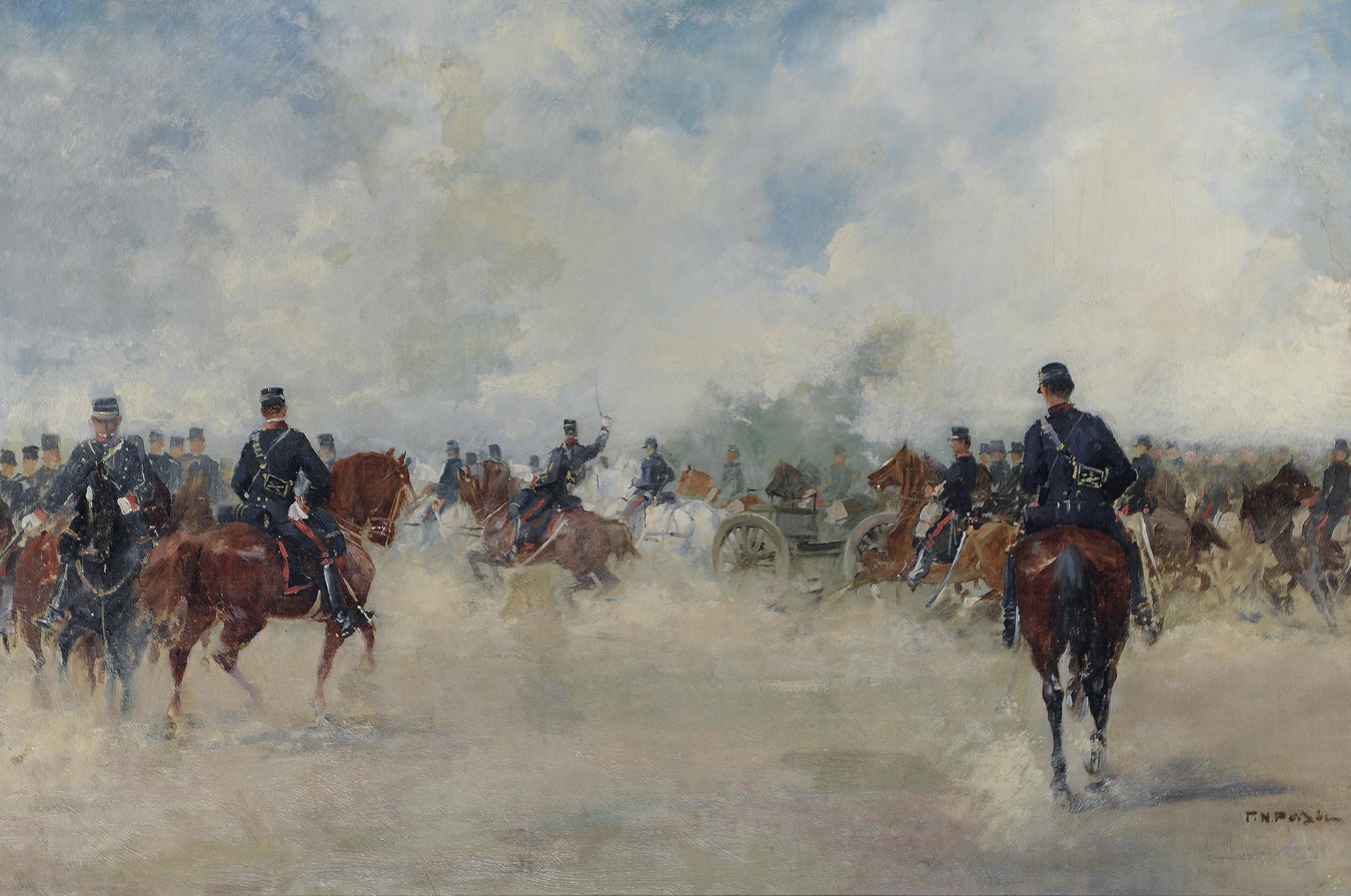
Greek cavalry during the battle of Farsala, by Georgios Roilos

Officially, war was declared on 18 April when the Ottoman ambassador in Athens, Asim Bey, met with the Greek foreign minister announcing the cutting of diplomatic ties. Heavy fighting occurred between 21 and 22 April outside the town of Tyrnavos but when the overwhelming Ottoman forces converged and pushed together, the Greek general staff ordered a general withdrawal, spreading panic among soldiers and civilians alike. Larissa fell on 27 April, while the Greek front was being reorganised behind the strategic lines of Velestino, in Farsala. Nevertheless, a division was ordered to head for Velestino, thus cutting Greek forces in two, 60 km apart. Between 27 and 30 April, under the command of Col. Konstantinos Smolenskis, Greek forces checked and halted the Ottoman advance.

On 5 May three Ottoman divisions attacked Farsala, forcing an orderly withdrawal of Greek forces to Domokos; on the eve of those events Smolenskis had withdrawn from newly recaptured Velestino to Almyros. Volos fell into Ottoman hands on 8 May.

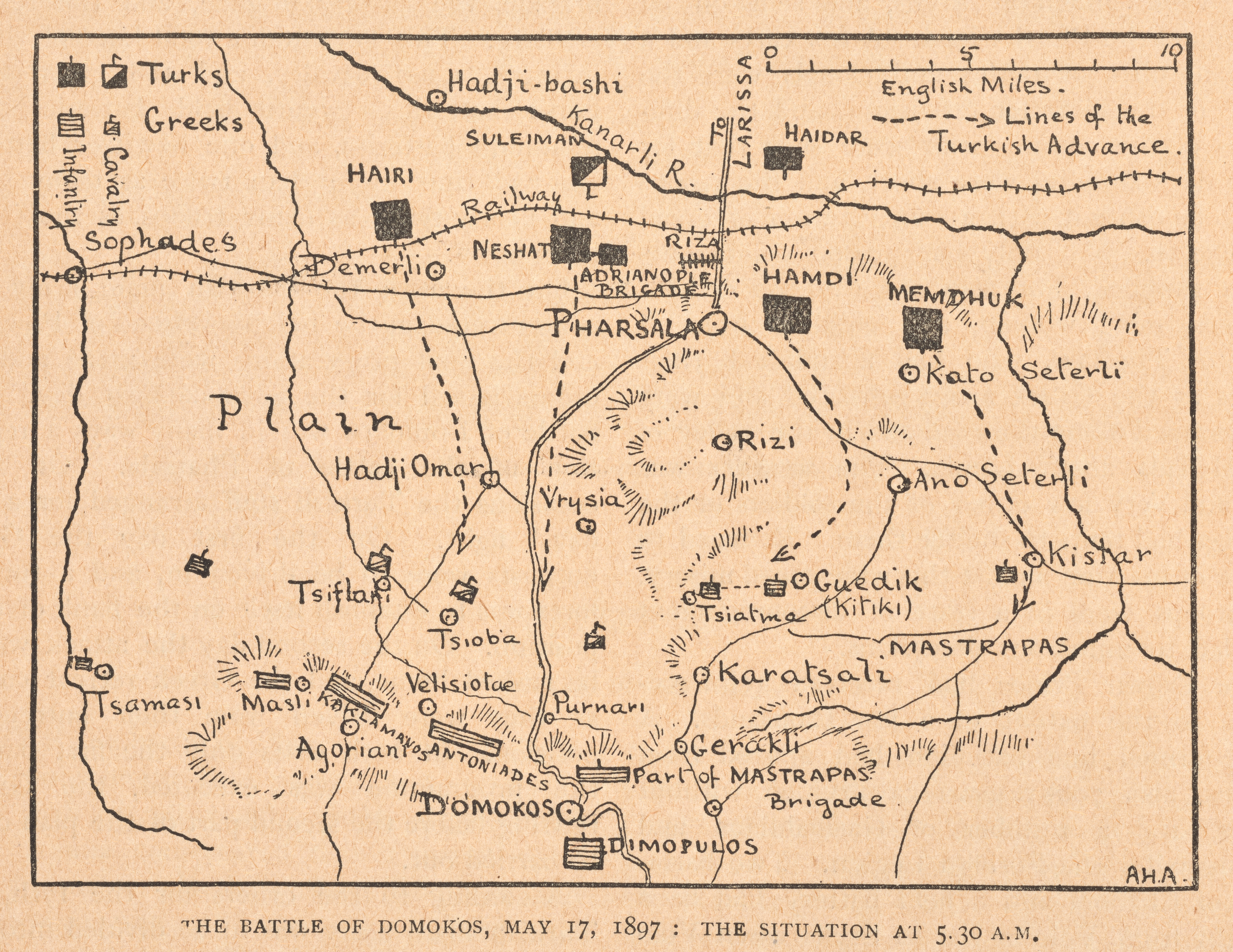
The situation at the Battle of Domokos on 17 May 1897, at 5.30 am

At Domokos the Greeks assembled 40,000 men in a strong defensive position, joined by about 2,000 Italian "Redshirt" volunteers under the command of Ricciotti Garibaldi, son of Giuseppe Garibaldi and the Philhellenic Legion of 150 men, from 16 different nationalities, most prominently British, French, German, Danish and Polish, as well as non-Redshirt Italian. The regiment was created after proposals by Henry Nevinson. A notable member of the Legion was the Swedish-speaking Finnish author John William Nylander. The Ottoman Empire had a total of about 70,000 troops, of whom about 45,000 were directly engaged in the battle.

On 16 May the attackers sent part of their army around the flank of the Greeks to cut off their line of retreat, but it failed to arrive in time. The next day, the rest of their army made a frontal assault. Both sides fought ferociously. The Ottomans were held at bay by the fire of the defending infantry until their left flank defeated the Greek right. The Ottoman formation broke through, forcing a renewed withdrawal. Smolenskis was ordered to stand his ground at the Thermopylae passage, but on 20 May a ceasefire went into effect.

=== Epirote and Macedonian front ===
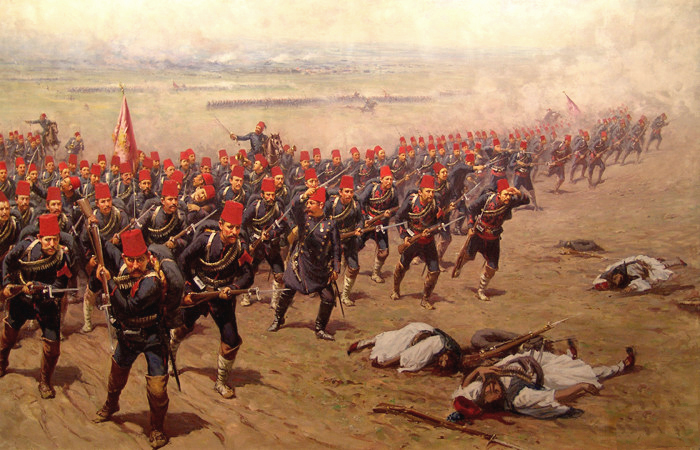
The Attack, a painting of the Battle of Domekos, by Fausto Zonaro

On 18 April, Ottoman forces under Ahmed Hifzi Pasha attacked the bridge of Arta but were forced to withdraw and reorganise around Pente Pigadia. Five days later Col. Thrasyvoulos Manos captured Pente Pigadia, but the Greek advance was halted due to lack of reinforcements against an already numerically superior opposition. On 12 May Greek forces tried to cut off Preveza but were forced to retreat with heavy casualties.

Greek forces entered the villages of Gkrintades (now Aimilianos), Kipoureio, Pigaditsa, Plesia (now Melissi), Sitovo (now Sitaras) and Zalovo (now Trikomo) without major difficulties. Upon reaching Baltinon (now Kallithea), they met armed resistance from local Aromanian fighters, organized and led by armatoles Steriu Milior Apostolina, Dauca and Mihali Teguiani and schoolteacher Dimitrie Cicma.

Aromanians collaborating with the Ottoman side against Greece were broadly coordinated by Apostol Mărgărit; their actions also included some assistance in logistics for the Ottoman army, particularly in the supply of food for the Turks. Nonetheless, the Austro-Hungarian envoy to Volos reported that Aromanians collaborating with the Ottomans were an "insignificant number". Furthermore, other Aromanians, such as Georgios Lepintatos, fought for Greece, especially in Samarina.

=== Armistice ===
On 20 September a peace treaty was signed between the two sides. Greece was forced to cede minor border areas and pay heavy reparations. To pay the latter, the Greek economy came under the formal oversight of the International Financial Commission. For the Greek public opinion and the military, the forced armistice was a humiliation, highlighting the unpreparedness of the country to fulfill its national aspirations.

=== Map gallery ===
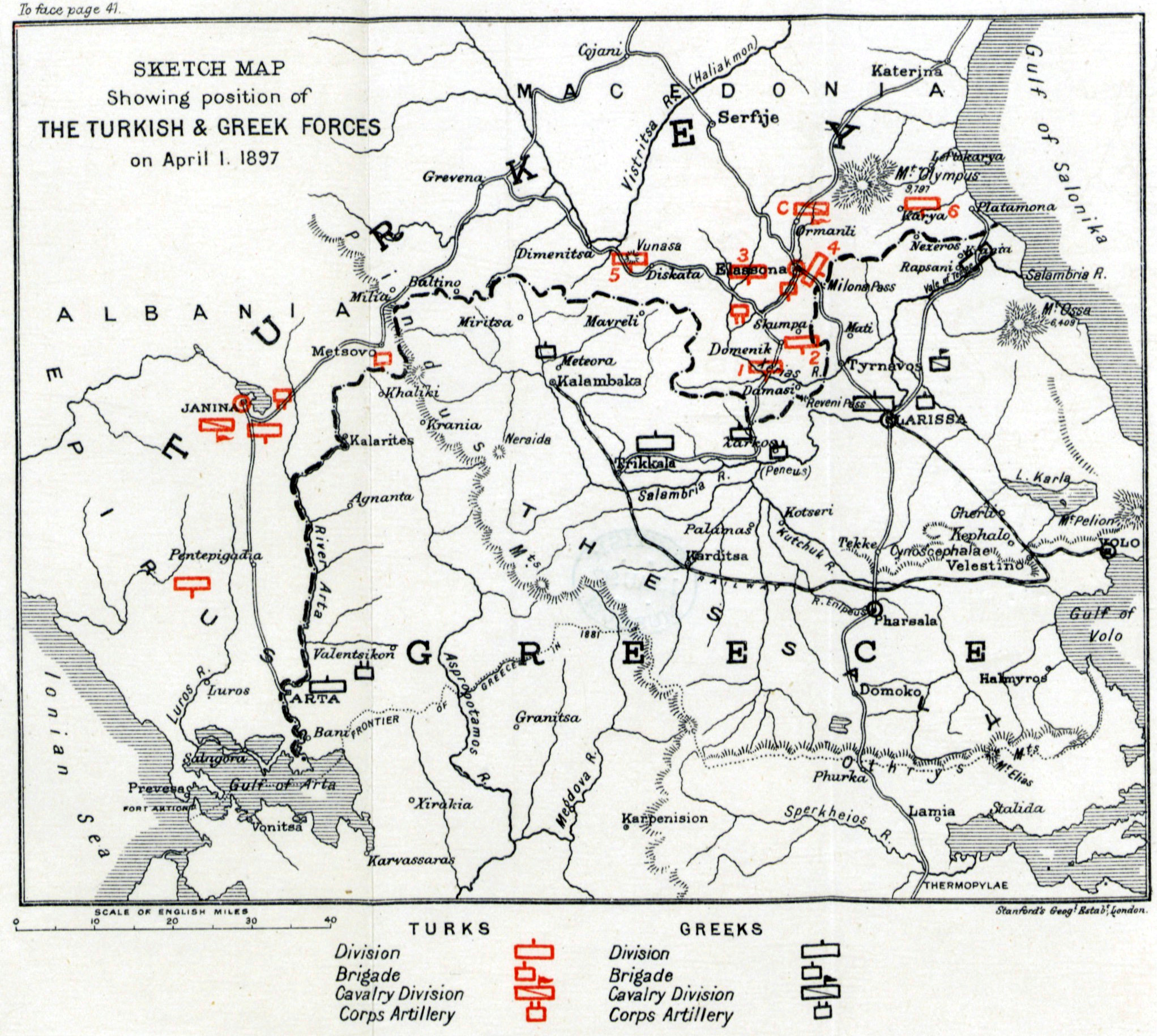
Disposition of the Greek and Ottoman forces on 1 April

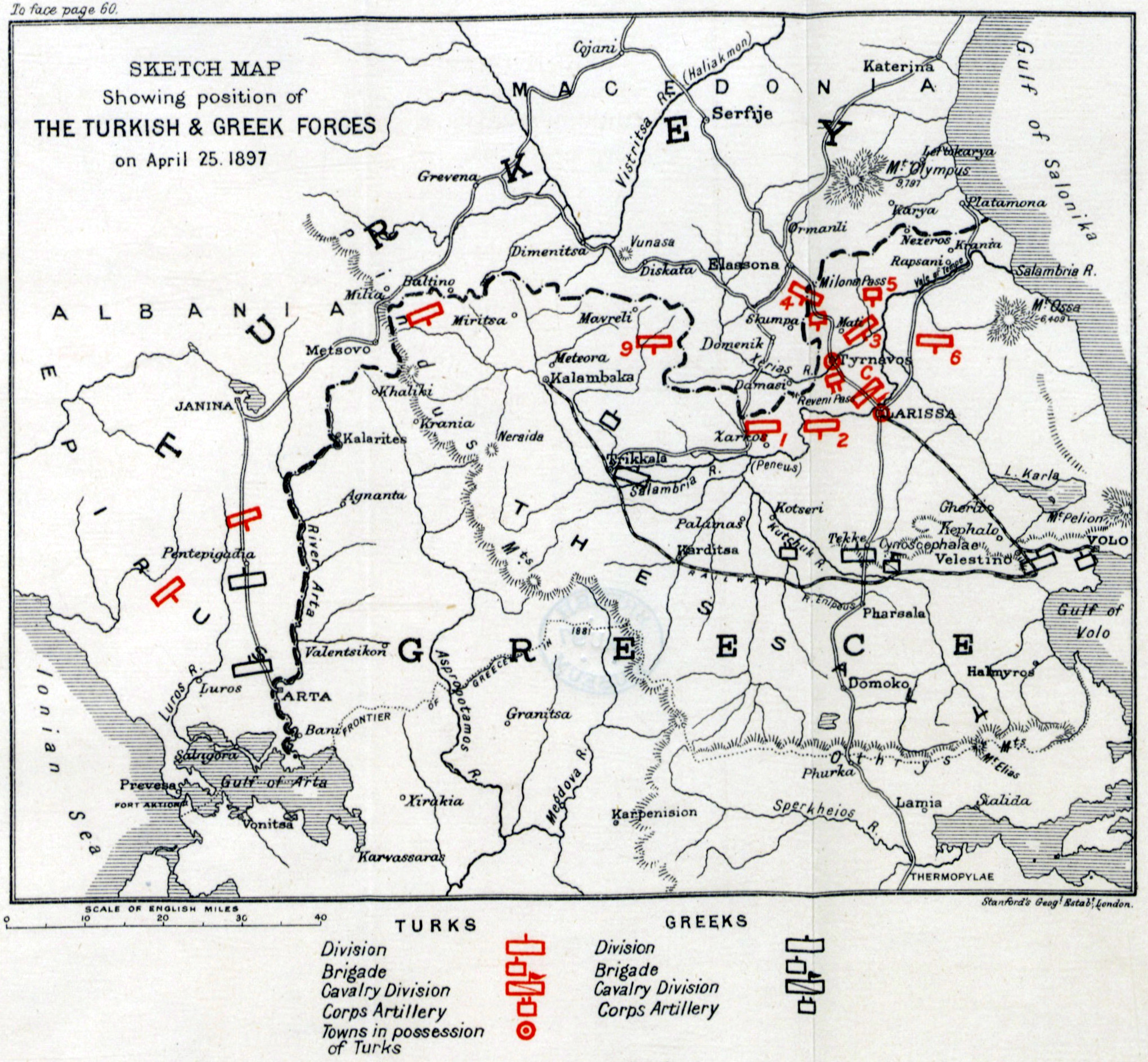
Disposition of the Greek and Ottoman forces on 25 April

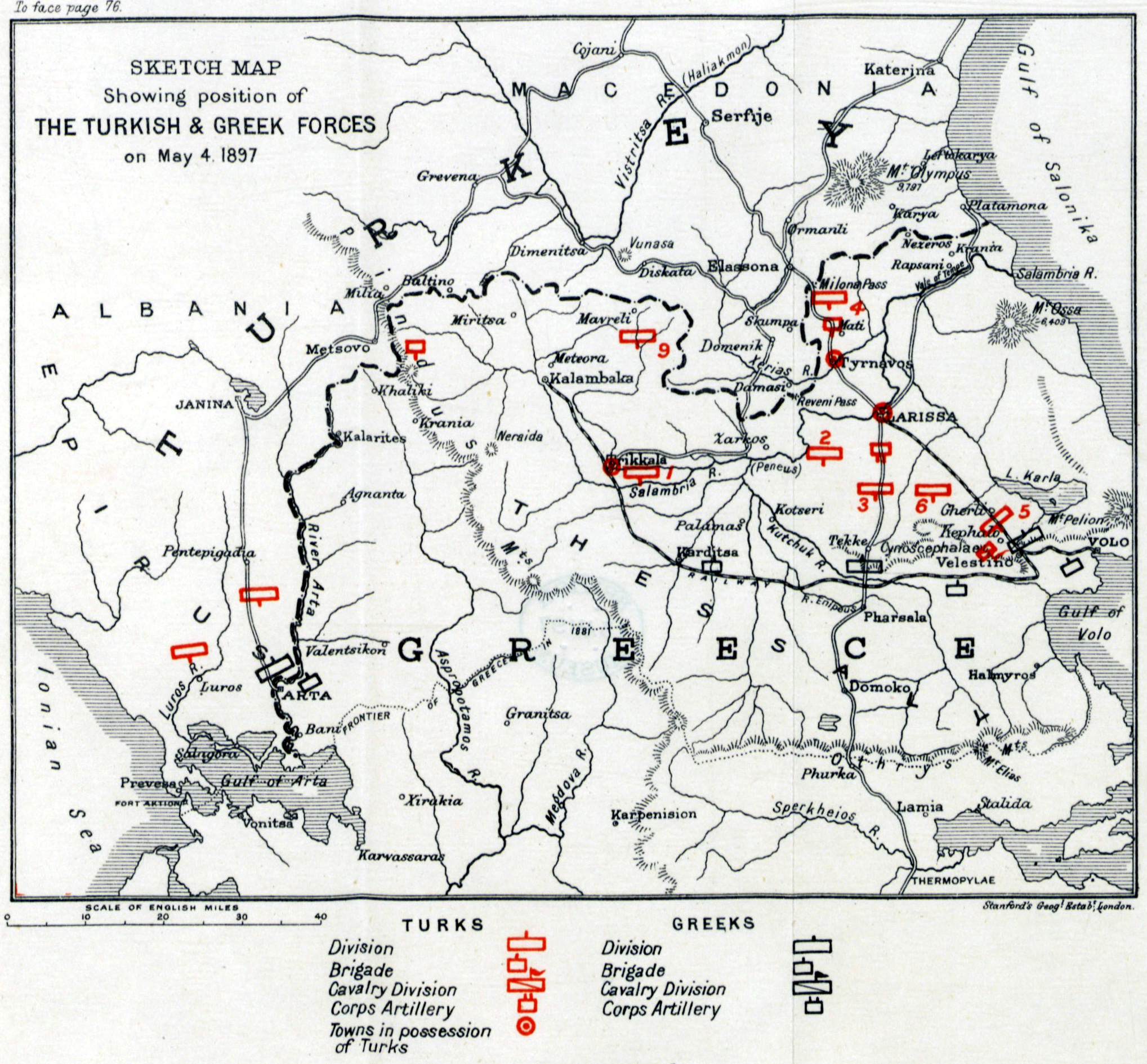
Disposition of the Greek and Ottoman forces on 4 May

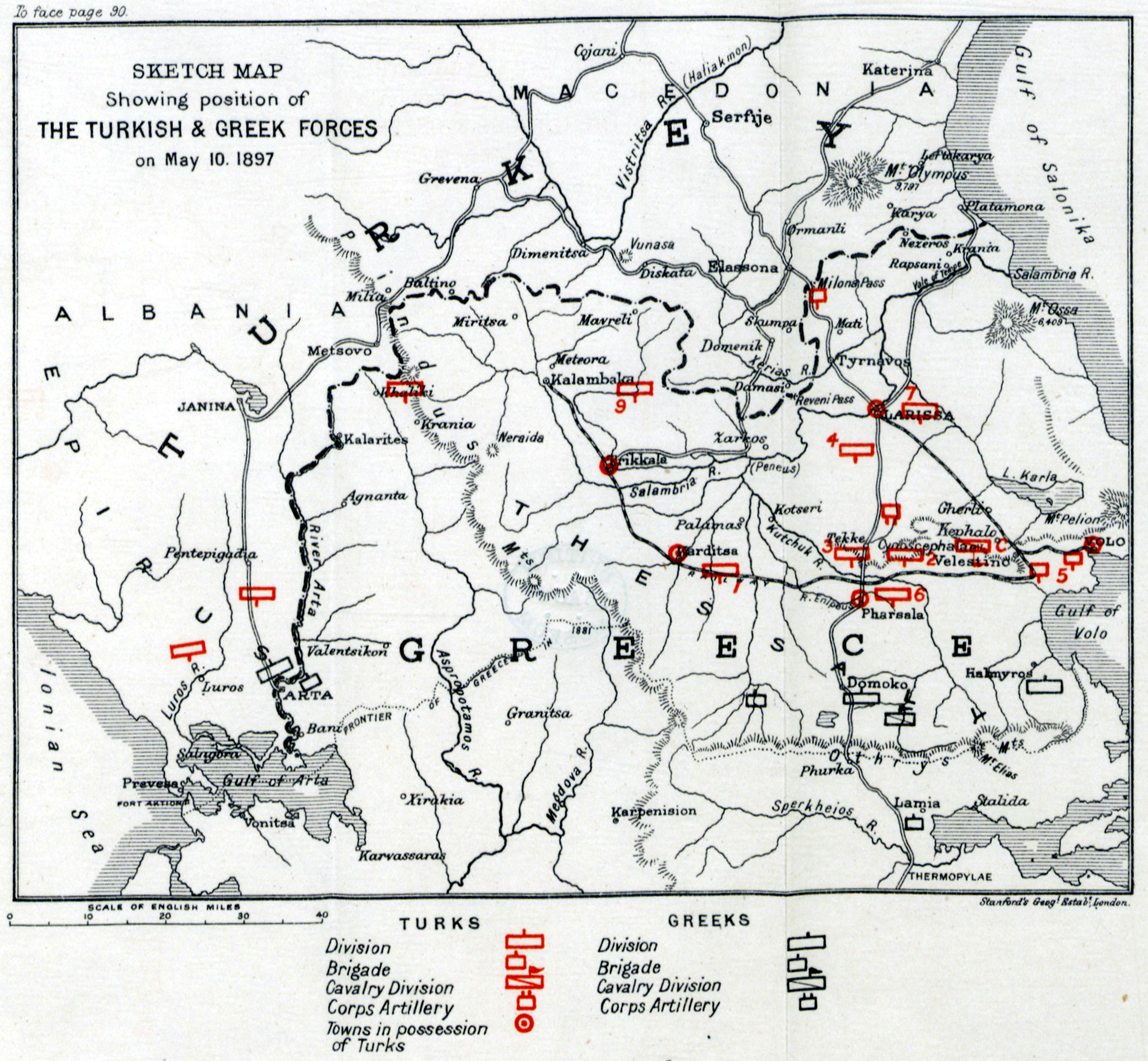
Disposition of the Greek and Ottoman forces on 10 May

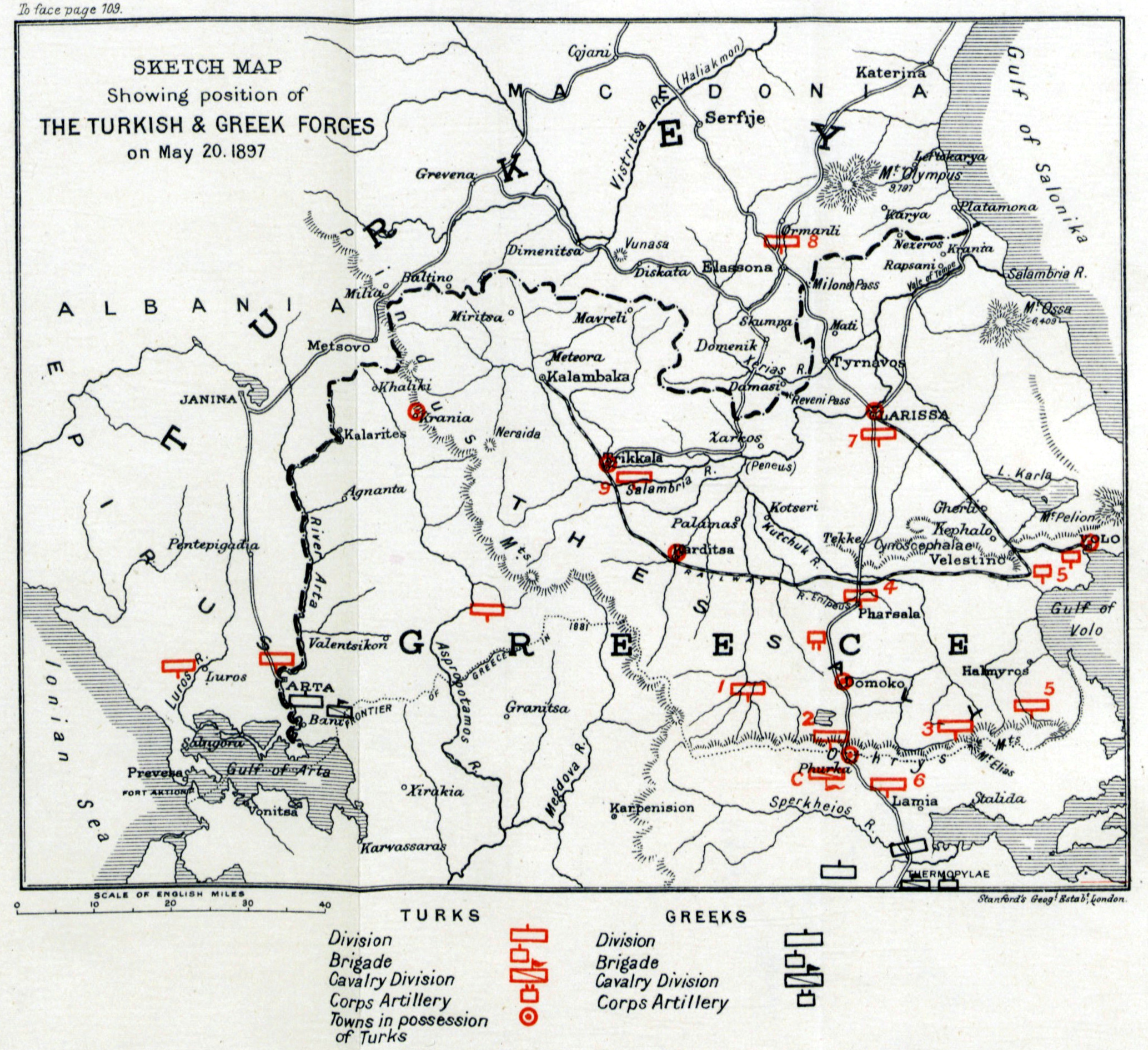
Disposition of the Greek and Ottoman forces on 20 May

== Aftermath ==
Despite the end of the war, the uprising on Crete continued – although with no further organized combat – until November 1898, when the Great Powers evicted Ottoman forces from the island to make way for an autonomous Cretan State under the suzerainty of the Ottoman Empire. Officially founded in December 1898 when Prince George of Greece and Denmark arrived on Crete to take up his duties as High Commissioner, the Cretan State survived until 1913, when Greece formally annexed the island.

In Greece, the public awareness of the country's unpreparedness for war in pursuit of its national aspirations laid the seeds for the Goudi coup of 1909, which called for immediate reforms in the Greek Army, economy, and society. When Eleftherios Venizelos came to power, as a leader of the Liberal party, he instigated reforms that transformed the Greek state, leading it to victory in the Balkan Wars of 1912-1913 three years later.

== See also ==
- International Squadron (Cretan intervention, 1897–1898)

== Bibliography ==
- Ο Ελληνοτουρκικός Πόλεμος του 1897 [The Greco-Turkish War of 1897] (in Greek). Athens: Hellenic Army History Directorate. 1993. OCLC 880458520.
- Clodfelter, M. (2017). Warfare and Armed Conflicts: A Statistical Encyclopedia of Casualty and Other Figures, 1492–2015 (4th ed.). Jefferson, North Carolina: McFarland. ISBN 978-0786474707.
- Ekinci, Mehmet Uğur (2006). The Origins of the 1897 Ottoman-Greek War: A Diplomatic History (PDF) (M.A. thesis). Ankara: Bilkent University. Revised edition: Ekinci, Mehmet Uğur (2009). The Unwanted War: The Diplomatic Background of the Ottoman-Greek War of 1897. Saarbrücken: VDM Verlag Dr. Müller. ISBN 978-3-639-15456-6.
- Gardiner, Robert, ed. (1979). Conway's All the World's Fighting Ships 1860–1905. New York: Mayflower Books. ISBN 0-8317-0302-4.
- McTiernan, Mick, A Very Bad Place Indeed For a Soldier. The British involvement in the early stages of the European Intervention in Crete. 1897–1898, King's College, London, September 2014.
- Minov, Nikola (2013). "Власите и Грчко-турската војна од 1897 година". Влашкото прашање и романската пропаганда во Македонија (1860-1903) (in Macedonian). Ars Libris. pp. 288–294. ISBN 978-608-229-522-0.
- Pears, Sir Edwin. "Forty Years in Constantinople" (1916)
- von Strantz, Karl Julius W. Viktor (1900). Modern Warfare: As Illustrated by the Greco-Turkish War. London: Swan Sonnenschein and Co.
- Uralanis, Boris (1960). Войны и народонаселение Европы: людские потери вооруженных сил Европейских стран в XVII-XX веках [Wars and the population of Europe: human losses of the armed forces of European countries in the XVII-XX centuries] (in Russian). Moscow: Социально-экономическая литература.
- Schwartz, Alexey; Apushkin, Vladimir; Schoultz, Gustav; Velichko, Konstantin I. (1912). Греко-турецкiя войны [Greco-Turkish Wars]. In Novitsky, Vasily (ed.). Sytin Military Encyclopedia (in Russian). Vol. 8: Гимры – Двигатели судовые. Moscow: Типография Т-ва И. Д. Сытина. pp. 472–479.
