= Spilaio, Grevena =

Spilaio Σπήλαιο
- Community
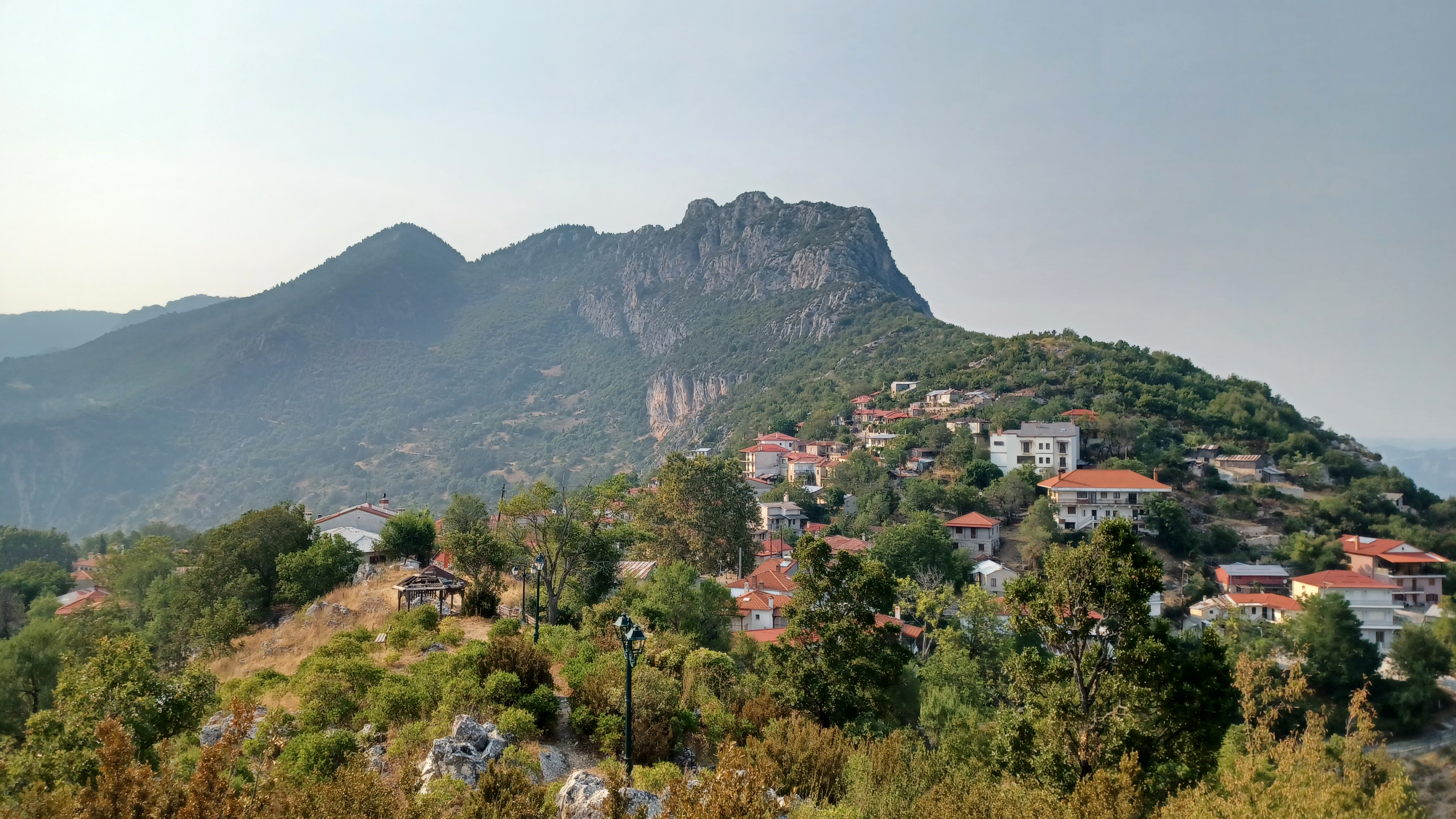
- Spilaio

- Location within Greece
- Coordinates: 40°0.3′N 21°17′E
- Country: Greece
- Administrative region: Western Macedonia
- Regional unit: Grevena
- Municipality: Grevena
- Municipal unit: Theodoros Ziakas

Area
  - Community: 39.504 km^{2} (15.253 sq mi)
- Elevation: 960 m (3,150 ft)

Population (2021)
  - Community: 194
  - Density: 4.91/km^{2} (12.7/sq mi)
- Time zone: UTC+2 (EET)
  - Summer (DST): UTC+3 (EEST)
- Postal code: 511 00
- Area code: +30-2462
- Vehicle registration: PN

Spilaio (Greek: Σπήλαιο) is a village and a community of the Grevena municipality. Before the 2011 local government reform, it was a part of the municipality of Theodoros Ziakas, of which it was a municipal district. The 2021 census recorded 194 residents in the village. The community of Spilaio covers an area of 39.504 km^{2}.

== See also ==
- List of settlements in the Grevena regional unit
