= Lavdas =

Lavdas Λάβδας
- Community
- Location within Greece
- Coordinates: 40°1.9′N 21°11.5′E
- Country: Greece
- Administrative region: Western Macedonia
- Regional unit: Grevena
- Municipality: Grevena
- Municipal unit: Theodoros Ziakas

Area
  - Community: 10.671 km^{2} (4.120 sq mi)
- Elevation: 1,040 m (3,410 ft)

Population (2021)
  - Community: 27
  - Density: 2.5/km^{2} (6.6/sq mi)
- Time zone: UTC+2 (EET)
  - Summer (DST): UTC+3 (EEST)
- Postal code: 510 32
- Area code: +30-2462
- Vehicle registration: PN

Lavdas (Greek: Λάβδας) is a village and a community of the Grevena municipality. Before the 2011 local government reform it was a part of the municipality of Theodoros Ziakas, of which it was a municipal district. The 2021 census recorded 27 residents in the village. The community of Lavdas covers an area of 10.671 km^{2}.

== See also ==
- List of settlements in the Grevena regional unit
