= Monachiti =

Monachiti Μοναχίτι
- Community
- Location within Greece
- Coordinates: 39°58′N 21°16.4′E
- Country: Greece
- Administrative region: Western Macedonia
- Regional unit: Grevena
- Municipality: Grevena
- Municipal unit: Theodoros Ziakas

Area
  - Community: 41.681 km^{2} (16.093 sq mi)
- Elevation: 1,010 m (3,310 ft)

Population (2021)
  - Community: 73
  - Density: 1.8/km^{2} (4.5/sq mi)
- Time zone: UTC+2 (EET)
  - Summer (DST): UTC+3 (EEST)
- Postal code: 511 00
- Area code: +30-2462
- Vehicle registration: PN

Monachiti (Greek: Μοναχίτι) is a village and a community of the Grevena municipality. Before the 2011 local government reform it was a part of the municipality of Theodoros Ziakas, of which it was a municipal district. The 2021 census recorded 73 residents in the village. The community of Monachiti covers an area of 41.681 km^{2}.

== See also ==
- List of settlements in the Grevena regional unit
