= Palaiochori =

Palaiochori (Greek: Παλαιοχώρι meaning "old town") may refer to several places in Greece:

- Palaiochori, Arcadia, a village in Arcadia, part of the municipal unit Leonidio
- Palaiochori, Chalkidiki, a village in Chalkidiki, part of the municipality Aristotelis
- Palaiochori, Elis, a village in Elis, part of the municipality Pineios
- Palaiochori, Evrytania, a village in Evrytania, part of the municipal unit Fragkista
- Palaiochori, Grevena, a village in the Grevena regional unit, part of the municipality Grevena
- Palaiochori Botsari, a village in the Ioannina regional unit, part of the municipal unit Lakka Souliou
- Palaiochori Sirakou, a village in the Ioannina regional unit, part of the municipality North Tzoumerka
- Palaiochori, Athamanes, a village in the Karditsa regional unit, part of the municipal unit Anatoliki Argithea
- Palaiochori, Mouzaki, a village in the Karditsa regional unit, part of the municipal unit Pamisos
- Palaiochori, Kavala, a village in the Kavala regional unit, part of the municipality Pangaio
- Palaiochori, Lesbos, a village on Lesbos Island, part of the municipal unit Plomari
- Palaiochori Dorieon, a village in Phthiotis, part of the municipal unit Amfikleia
- Palaiochori Tymfristou, a village in Phthiotis, part of the municipal unit Spercheiada
- Palaiochori, Thesprotia, a village in Thesprotia, part of the municipality Filiates
- Palaiochori, Trikala, a village in the Trikala regional unit, part of the municipal unit Kleino
- Palaiochori, Kozani, a village in Eordaia, now called Foufas
