= Polydendro =

Polydendro may refer to the following places in Greece:

- Polydendro, Grevena, part of the municipal unit Irakleotes, Grevena regional unit
- Polydendro, Imathia, part of the municipal unit Makedonida, Imathia
