= Kipoureio =

Kipoureio Κηπουρείο
- Community
- Location within Greece
- Coordinates: 39°57.2′N 21°21.7′E
- Country: Greece
- Administrative region: Western Macedonia
- Regional unit: Grevena
- Municipality: Grevena
- Municipal unit: Gorgiani

Area
  - Community: 40.285 km^{2} (15.554 sq mi)
- Elevation: 840 m (2,760 ft)

Population (2021)
  - Community: 125
  - Density: 3.10/km^{2} (8.04/sq mi)
- Time zone: UTC+2 (EET)
  - Summer (DST): UTC+3 (EEST)
- Postal code: 510 31
- Area code: +30-2462
- Vehicle registration: PN

Kipoureio or Kipourio (Greek: Κηπουρείο or Κηπουριό) is a village and a community of the Grevena municipality. Before the 2011 local government reform it was a part of the municipality of Gorgiani, of which it was a municipal district and the seat. The 2021 census recorded 125 residents in the village. The community of Kipoureio covers an area of 40.285 km^{2}.

In the early nineteenth century, traveller William Martin Leake wrote Kipoureio was a Vlach village. According to the statistics of Vasil Kanchov ("Macedonia, Ethnography and Statistics"), 600 Greek Christians lived in the village in 1900. Historian Nicholas Hammond described Kipoureio as a Vlach village during his travels in the area during the interwar period. Historian Asterios Koukoudis states Kipoureio possibly experienced a process of assimilation, similar to the village of Mikrolivado.

== See also ==
- List of settlements in the Grevena regional unit
