= Kyrakali =

Kyrakali Κυρακαλή
- Community
- Location within Greece
- Coordinates: 40°5.8′N 21°22.4′E
- Country: Greece
- Administrative region: Western Macedonia
- Regional unit: Grevena
- Municipality: Grevena
- Municipal unit: Grevena

Area
  - Community: 9.277 km^{2} (3.582 sq mi)
- Elevation: 590 m (1,940 ft)

Population (2021)
  - Community: 109
  - Density: 11.7/km^{2} (30.4/sq mi)
- Time zone: UTC+2 (EET)
  - Summer (DST): UTC+3 (EEST)
- Postal code: 511 00
- Area code: +30-2462
- Vehicle registration: PN

Kyrakali (Greek: Κυρακαλή) is a village and a community of the Grevena municipality. Before the 2011 local government reform it was a part of the municipality of Grevena, of which it was a municipal district. The 2021 census recorded 109 residents in the village. The community of Kyrakali covers an area of 9.277 km^{2}.

Kyrakali was populated by Greek speaking Muslim Vallahades. The 1920 Greek census recorded 215 people in the village, and 215 inhabitants (38 families) were Muslim in 1923. Following the Greek–Turkish population exchange, Greek refugee families in Kyrakali were from Asia Minor (20) and Pontus (55) in 1926. The 1928 Greek census recorded 249 village inhabitants. In 1928, the refugee families numbered 76 (264 people).

== See also ==
- List of settlements in the Grevena regional unit
