= Polyneri, Grevena =

Polyneri Πολυνέρι
- Community
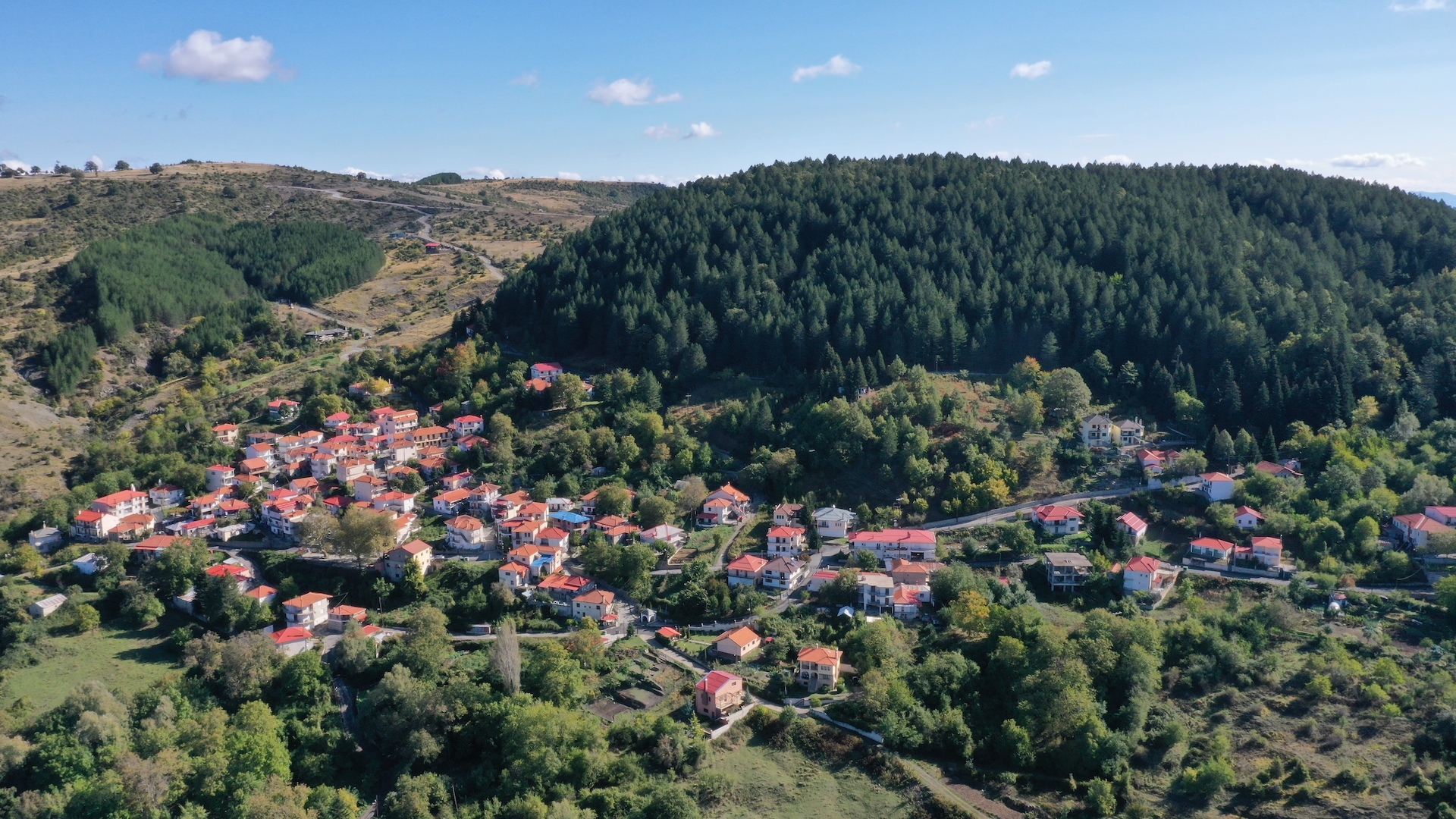

- Location within Greece
- Coordinates: 40°2.9′N 21°12.2′E
- Country: Greece
- Administrative region: Western Macedonia
- Regional unit: Grevena
- Municipality: Grevena
- Municipal unit: Theodoros Ziakas

Area
  - Community: 10.321 km^{2} (3.985 sq mi)
- Elevation: 950 m (3,120 ft)

Population (2021)
  - Community: 58
  - Density: 5.6/km^{2} (15/sq mi)
- Time zone: UTC+2 (EET)
  - Summer (DST): UTC+3 (EEST)
- Postal code: 510 32
- Area code: +30-2462
- Vehicle registration: PN

Polyneri (Greek: Πολυνέρι, before 1927: Βοδεντσικό – Vodentsiko) is a village and a community of the Grevena municipality. Before the 2011 local government reform it was a part of the municipality of Theodoros Ziakas, of which it was a municipal district. The 2021 census recorded 58 residents in the village. The community of Polyneri covers an area of 10.321 km^{2}.

== See also ==
- List of settlements in the Grevena regional unit
