= Klimataki =

Klimataki Κληματάκι
- Community
- Location within Greece
- Coordinates: 40°12.2′N 21°22.2′E
- Country: Greece
- Administrative region: Western Macedonia
- Regional unit: Grevena
- Municipality: Grevena
- Municipal unit: Irakleotes

Area
  - Community: 13.628 km^{2} (5.262 sq mi)
- Elevation: 717 m (2,352 ft)

Population (2021)
  - Community: 81
  - Density: 5.9/km^{2} (15/sq mi)
- Time zone: UTC+2 (EET)
  - Summer (DST): UTC+3 (EEST)
- Postal code: 510 30
- Area code: +30-2462
- Vehicle registration: PN

Klimataki (Greek: Κληματάκι, before 1927: Δοβρούνιστα – Dovrounista) is a village and a community of the Grevena municipality. Before the 2011 local government reform it was a part of the municipality of Irakleotes, of which it was a municipal district. The 2021 census recorded 81 residents in the village. The community of Klimataki covers an area of 13.628 km^{2}.

Dovrounista was a mixed village and a part of its population were Greek speaking Muslim Vallahades. The 1920 Greek census recorded 416 people in the village, and 300 inhabitants (45 families) were Muslim in 1923. Following the Greek–Turkish population exchange, Greek refugee families in Dovrounista were from East Thrace (1), Asia Minor (16) and Pontus (13) in 1926. The 1928 Greek census recorded 333 village inhabitants. In 1928, the refugee families numbered 31 (102 people).

== See also ==
- List of settlements in the Grevena regional unit
