= Dasaki =

Dasaki Δασάκι
- Settlement
- Location within Greece
- Coordinates: 40°11.7′N 21°20.7′E
- Country: Greece
- Administrative region: Western Macedonia
- Regional unit: Grevena
- Municipality: Grevena
- Municipal unit: Irakleotes
- Community: Aidonia
- Elevation: 750 m (2,460 ft)

Population (2021)
  - Total: 7
- Time zone: UTC+2 (EET)
  - Summer (DST): UTC+3 (EEST)
- Postal code: 511 00
- Area code: +30-2462
- Vehicle registration: PN

Dasaki (Greek: Δασάκι, before 1950: Παλαιοκόπρια – Palaiokopria) is a village of the Grevena municipality. Before the 2011 local government reform it was a part of the municipality of Irakleotes. The 2021 census recorded 7 residents in the village. Dasaki is a part of the community of Aidonia.

== See also ==
- List of settlements in the Grevena regional unit
