= List of settlements in the Grevena regional unit =

This is a list of settlements in the Grevena regional unit, Greece.

- Agalaioi
- Agapi
- Agioi Theodoroi
- Agios Georgios, Grevena
- Agios Georgios, Deskati
- Agios Kosmas
- Aidonia
- Aimilianos
- Alatopetra
- Amygdalies
- Anavryta
- Ano Ekklisia
- Anoixi
- Anthrakia
- Asprokampos
- Avdella
- Dasaki
- Dasochori
- Dasyllio
- Deskati
- Despotis
- Diasellaki
- Dimitra
- Diporo
- Dotsiko
- Doxaras
- Ekklisia
- Elatos
- Elefthero
- Eleftherochori
- Elefthero Prosfygon
- Exarchos
- Felli
- Filippaioi
- Georgitsa
- Gilofos
- Grevena
- Itea
- Kalamitsi
- Kalirachi
- Kallithea
- Kalloni
- Kalochi
- Karpero
- Kastro
- Katakali
- Kentro
- Kipoureio
- Kivotos
- Klimataki
- Knidi
- Kokkinia
- Kosmati
- Kranea
- Kydonies
- Kyparissi
- Kyrakali
- Lavdas
- Leipsi
- Mavranaioi
- Mavronoros
- Megalo Seirini
- Megaro
- Mesolakkos
- Mesolouri
- Mikro Seirini
- Mikrokleisoura
- Mikrolivado
- Milea
- Monachiti
- Myrsina
- Nea Trapezounta
- Neochori
- Nisi
- Oropedio
- Palaiochori
- Paliouria
- Panagia
- Panorama
- Paraskevi
- Perivolaki
- Perivoli
- Pigaditsa
- Pistiko
- Polydendro
- Polyneri
- Pontini
- Poros
- Prionia
- Prosvorro
- Pyloroi
- Rodia
- Samarina
- Sarakina
- Sitaras
- Smixi
- Spilaio
- Stavros
- Syndendro
- Taxiarchis
- Trifylli
- Trikokkia
- Trikomo
- Trikorfo
- Varis
- Vatolakkos
- Veloni
- Ziakas

== See also ==
- Slavic toponyms of places in Grevena Prefecture
- List of towns and villages in Greece
