= Alatopetra =

Alatopetra Αλατόπετρα
- Community
- Location within Greece
- Coordinates: 40°4′N 21°13.2′E
- Country: Greece
- Administrative region: Western Macedonia
- Regional unit: Grevena
- Municipality: Grevena
- Municipal unit: Theodoros Ziakas

Area
  - Community: 8.272 km^{2} (3.194 sq mi)
- Elevation: 940 m (3,080 ft)

Population (2021)
  - Community: 48
  - Density: 5.8/km^{2} (15/sq mi)
- Time zone: UTC+2 (EET)
  - Summer (DST): UTC+3 (EEST)
- Postal code: 510 32
- Area code: +30-2462
- Vehicle registration: PN

Alatopetra (Greek: Αλατόπετρα, before 1927: Τούζι – Touzi) is a village and a community of the Grevena municipality. Before the 2011 local government reform it was a part of the municipality of Theodoros Ziakas, of which it was a municipal district. The 2021 census recorded 48 residents in the village. The community of Alatopetra covers an area of 8.272 km^{2}.

== See also ==
- List of settlements in the Grevena regional unit
