= Prionia, Grevena =

Prionia Πριόνια
- Settlement
- Location within Greece
- Coordinates: 39°53′N 21°22′E
- Country: Greece
- Administrative region: Western Macedonia
- Regional unit: Grevena
- Municipality: Grevena
- Municipal unit: Gorgiani
- Community: Kallithea
- Elevation: 750 m (2,460 ft)

Population (2021)
  - Total: 63
- Time zone: UTC+2 (EET)
  - Summer (DST): UTC+3 (EEST)
- Postal code: 510 31
- Area code: +30-2462
- Vehicle registration: PN

Prionia (Greek: Πριόνια, before 1927: Μπόζοβο – Bozovo; Aromanian: Bozovo) is a village and community of Grevena municipality, Greece. Prionia is an Aromanian (Vlach) village. Before the 2011 local government reform it was a part of the municipality of Gorgiani. The 2021 census recorded 63 residents in the village. Prionia is a part of the community of Kallithea.

== See also ==
- List of settlements in the Grevena regional unit
