= Panorama, Grevena =

Panorama Πανόραμα
- Community
- Location within Greece
- Coordinates: 40°2.3′N 21°10.6′E
- Country: Greece
- Administrative region: Western Macedonia
- Regional unit: Grevena
- Municipality: Grevena
- Municipal unit: Theodoros Ziakas

Area
  - Community: 7.023 km^{2} (2.712 sq mi)
- Elevation: 1,070 m (3,510 ft)

Population (2021)
  - Community: 31
  - Density: 4.4/km^{2} (11/sq mi)
- Time zone: UTC+2 (EET)
  - Summer (DST): UTC+3 (EEST)
- Postal code: 510 32
- Area code: +30-2462
- Vehicle registration: PN

Panorama (Greek: Πανόραμα, before 1927: Σαραγκαναίοι – Saragkanaioi) is a village and a community of the Grevena municipality. Before the 2011 local government reform it was a part of the municipality of Theodoros Ziakas, of which it was a municipal district. The 2021 census recorded 31 residents in the village. The community of Panorama covers an area of 7.023 km^{2}.

== See also ==
- List of settlements in the Grevena regional unit
