= Pigaditsa =

Pigaditsa Πηγαδίτσα
- Community
- Location within Greece
- Coordinates: 39°59.1′N 21°24.6′E
- Country: Greece
- Administrative region: Western Macedonia
- Regional unit: Grevena
- Municipality: Grevena
- Municipal unit: Gorgiani

Area
  - Community: 19.128 km^{2} (7.385 sq mi)
- Elevation: 700 m (2,300 ft)

Population (2021)
  - Community: 79
  - Density: 4.1/km^{2} (11/sq mi)
- Time zone: UTC+2 (EET)
  - Summer (DST): UTC+3 (EEST)
- Postal code: 510 31
- Area code: +30-2462
- Vehicle registration: PN

Pigaditsa (Greek: Πηγαδίτσα) is a village and a community of the Grevena municipality. Before the 2011 local government reform it was a part of the municipality of Gorgiani, of which it was a municipal district. The 2021 census recorded 79 residents in the village. The community of Pigaditsa covers an area of 19.128 km^{2}.

Pigaditsa was populated by Greek speaking Muslim Vallahades. The 1920 Greek census recorded 418 people in the village, and 418 inhabitants (115 families) were Muslim in 1923. Following the Greek–Turkish population exchange, Greek refugee families in Pigaditsa were from East Thrace (1), Asia Minor (6) and Pontus (64) in 1926. The 1928 Greek census recorded 350 village inhabitants. In 1928, the refugee families numbered 71 (254 people).

== Notable people ==
Miltos Tentoglou

== See also ==
- List of settlements in the Grevena regional unit
