= Kivotos =

Kivotos Κιβωτός
- Community
- Location within Greece
- Coordinates: 40°12.3′N 21°26.6′E
- Country: Greece
- Administrative region: Western Macedonia
- Regional unit: Grevena
- Municipality: Grevena
- Municipal unit: Irakleotes

Area
  - Community: 25.281 km^{2} (9.761 sq mi)
- Elevation: 680 m (2,230 ft)

Population (2021)
  - Community: 331
  - Density: 13.1/km^{2} (33.9/sq mi)
- Time zone: UTC+2 (EET)
  - Summer (DST): UTC+3 (EEST)
- Postal code: 510 30
- Area code: +30-2462
- Vehicle registration: PN

Kivotos (Greek: Κιβωτός, before 1927: Κρίφτσι – Kriftsi) is a village and a community of the Grevena municipality. Before the 2011 local government reform it was a part of the municipality of Irakleotes, of which it was a municipal district. The 2021 census recorded 331 residents in the village. The community of Kivotos covers an area of 25.281 km^{2}.

According to the statistics of Vasil Kanchov ("Macedonia, Ethnography and Statistics"), 160 Greek Christians, 500 Greek Muslims and 50 Romani lived in the village in 1900.

Kriftsi was populated by Greek speaking Muslim Vallahades. The 1920 Greek census recorded 897 people in the village, and 897 inhabitants (187 families) were Muslim in 1923. Following the Greek–Turkish population exchange, Greek refugee families in Kriftsi were from Asia Minor (150) and Pontus (191) in 1926. The 1928 Greek census recorded 1,885 village inhabitants. In 1928, the refugee families numbered 334 (1,303 people). After their arrival, the refugees demolished the village mosque and constructed a small church at the site, later replaced with the present church of Agios Georgios.

== See also ==
- List of settlements in the Grevena regional unit
