= Anavryta =

Anavryta (Greek: Ανάβρυτα), may refer to:

- The Anavryta Experimental Lyceum in Athens, Greece
- The Anavryta Experimental Gymnasium in Athens, Greece
- Anavryta, a neighbourhood of the city of Marousi in northeast suburban Athens, Greece
- Anavryta, Grevena, a village in the Grevena regional unit
