= Oropedio, Grevena =

Oropedio Οροπέδιο
- Community
- Location within Greece
- Coordinates: 40°6.9′N 21°18.9′E
- Country: Greece
- Administrative region: Western Macedonia
- Regional unit: Grevena
- Municipality: Grevena
- Municipal unit: Agios Kosmas

Area
  - Community: 15.906 km^{2} (6.141 sq mi)
- Elevation: 860 m (2,820 ft)

Population (2021)
  - Community: 77
  - Density: 4.8/km^{2} (13/sq mi)
- Time zone: UTC+2 (EET)
  - Summer (DST): UTC+3 (EEST)
- Postal code: 511 00
- Area code: +30-2462
- Vehicle registration: PN

Oropedio (Greek: Οροπέδιο, before 1927: Βηλιά – Vilia) is a village and a community of the Grevena municipality. Before the 2011 local government reform it was a part of the municipality of Kosmas o Aitolos, of which it was a municipal district. The 2021 census recorded 77 residents in the village. The community of Oropedio covers an area of 15.906 km^{2}.

== See also ==
- List of settlements in the Grevena regional unit
