= Diasellaki =

Diasellaki Διασελλάκι
- Settlement
- Location within Greece
- Coordinates: 39°53.5′N 21°43.8′E
- Country: Greece
- Administrative region: Western Macedonia
- Regional unit: Grevena
- Municipality: Deskati
- Municipal unit: Deskati
- Community: Deskati
- Elevation: 740 m (2,430 ft)

Population (2021)
  - Total: 2
- Time zone: UTC+2 (EET)
  - Summer (DST): UTC+3 (EEST)
- Postal code: 512 00
- Area code: +30-2462
- Vehicle registration: PN

Diasellaki (Greek: Διασελλάκι, before 1927: Σέλισμα – Selisma), is a village of the Deskati municipality. The 2021 census recorded 2 inhabitants in the village. Diasellaki is a part of the community of Deskati.

== See also ==
- List of settlements in the Grevena regional unit
