= Ekklisia, Grevena =

Village in Greece

Ekklisia Εκκλησία
- Settlement
- Location within Greece
- Coordinates: 40°9′N 21°15.3′E
- Country: Greece
- Administrative region: Western Macedonia
- Regional unit: Grevena
- Municipality: Grevena
- Municipal unit: Agios Kosmas
- Community: Agios Kosmas
- Elevation: 930 m (3,050 ft)

Population (2021)
  - Total: 0
- Time zone: UTC+2 (EET)
  - Summer (DST): UTC+3 (EEST)
- Postal code: 511 00
- Area code: +30-2462
- Vehicle registration: PN

Ekklisia (Greek: Εκκλησία, before 1927: Βιβίτσι – Vivitsi) is a village of the Grevena municipality. Before the 2011 local government reform it was a part of the municipality of Agios Kosmas. The 2021 census recorded no permanent inhabitants in the village. Ekklisia is a part of the community of Agios Kosmas.

== See also ==
- List of settlements in the Grevena regional unit
