= Kalochi =

Kalochi Καλόχι
- Community
- Location within Greece
- Coordinates: 40°4.1′N 21°31.2′E
- Country: Greece
- Administrative region: Western Macedonia
- Regional unit: Grevena
- Municipality: Grevena
- Municipal unit: Grevena

Area
  - Community: 37.062 km^{2} (14.310 sq mi)
- Elevation: 563 m (1,847 ft)

Population (2021)
  - Community: 81
  - Density: 2.2/km^{2} (5.7/sq mi)
- Time zone: UTC+2 (EET)
  - Summer (DST): UTC+3 (EEST)
- Postal code: 511 00
- Area code: +30-2462
- Vehicle registration: PN

Kalochi (Greek: Καλόχι) is a village and a community of the Grevena municipality. Before the 2011 local government reform it was a part of the municipality of Grevena, of which it was a municipal district. The 2021 census recorded 81 residents in the community. The community of Kalochi covers an area of 37.062 km^{2}.

== Administrative division ==
The community of Kalochi consists of three separate settlements:

- Agapi (population 19 as of 2021)
- Kalochi (population 32)
- Mesolakkos (population 30)

== Population ==
Historical population
Year	Pop.	±%
2001	239	—
2011	106	−55.6%
2021	81	−23.6%

== See also ==
- List of settlements in the Grevena regional unit
