= Pyloroi =

Pyloroi Πυλωροί
- Community
- Location within Greece
- Coordinates: 40°5.3′N 21°39.1′E
- Country: Greece
- Administrative region: Western Macedonia
- Regional unit: Grevena
- Municipality: Grevena
- Municipal unit: Ventzio

Area
  - Community: 16.005 km^{2} (6.180 sq mi)
- Elevation: 730 m (2,400 ft)

Population (2021)
  - Community: 52
  - Density: 3.2/km^{2} (8.4/sq mi)
- Time zone: UTC+2 (EET)
  - Summer (DST): UTC+3 (EEST)
- Postal code: 511 00
- Area code: +30-2462
- Vehicle registration: PN

Pyloroi (Greek: Πυλωροί) is a village and a community of the Grevena municipality. Before the 2011 local government reform it was a part of the municipality of Ventzio, of which it was a municipal district. The 2021 census recorded 52 residents in the village. The community of Pyloroi covers an area of 16.005 km^{2}.

== See also ==
- List of settlements in the Grevena regional unit
