= Panagia, Grevena =

Panagia Παναγία
- Community
- Location within Greece
- Coordinates: 39°58.4′N 21°43.9′E
- Country: Greece
- Administrative region: Western Macedonia
- Regional unit: Grevena
- Municipality: Deskati
- Municipal unit: Deskati

Area
  - Community: 67.555 km^{2} (26.083 sq mi)
- Elevation: 424 m (1,391 ft)

Population (2021)
  - Community: 71
  - Density: 1.1/km^{2} (2.7/sq mi)
- Time zone: UTC+2 (EET)
  - Summer (DST): UTC+3 (EEST)
- Postal code: 512 00
- Area code: +30-2462
- Vehicle registration: PN

Panagia (Greek: Παναγία, before 1955: Τουρνίκιον – Tournikion) is a village and a community of the Deskati municipality. Before the 2011 local government reform it was part of the municipality of Deskati, of which it was a municipal district. The 2021 census recorded 71 inhabitants in the village. The community of Panagia covers an area of 67.555 km^{2}.

== See also ==
- List of settlements in the Grevena regional unit
