= Anavryta, Grevena =

Anavryta Αναβρυτά
- Community
- Location within Greece
- Coordinates: 40°3.6′N 21°16.6′E
- Country: Greece
- Administrative region: Western Macedonia
- Regional unit: Grevena
- Municipality: Grevena
- Municipal unit: Theodoros Ziakas

Area
  - Community: 11.104 km^{2} (4.287 sq mi)
- Elevation: 860 m (2,820 ft)

Population (2021)
  - Community: 18
  - Density: 1.6/km^{2} (4.2/sq mi)
- Time zone: UTC+2 (EET)
  - Summer (DST): UTC+3 (EEST)
- Postal code: 511 00
- Area code: +30-2462
- Vehicle registration: PN

Anavryta (Greek: Αναβρυτά, before 1927: Βραστόν – Vraston) is a village and a community of the Grevena municipality. Before the 2011 local government reform it was a part of the municipality of Theodoros Ziakas, of which it was a municipal district. The 2021 census recorded 18 residents in the village. The community of Anavryta covers an area of 11.104 km^{2}.

Vraston was populated by Greek speaking Muslim Vallahades. The 1920 Greek census recorded 212 people in the village, and 212 inhabitants (40 families) were Muslim in 1923. Following the Greek–Turkish population exchange, Greek refugee families in Vraston were from Asia Minor (2) and Pontus (25) in 1926. The 1928 Greek census recorded 125 village inhabitants. In 1928, the refugee families numbered 29 (106 people).

== See also ==
- List of settlements in the Grevena regional unit
