= Rodia, Grevena =

Rodia Ροδιά
- Community
- Location within Greece
- Coordinates: 40°8.8′N 21°19.7′E
- Country: Greece
- Administrative region: Western Macedonia
- Regional unit: Grevena
- Municipality: Grevena
- Municipal unit: Grevena

Area
  - Community: 12.877 km^{2} (4.972 sq mi)
- Elevation: 960 m (3,150 ft)

Population (2021)
  - Community: 151
  - Density: 11.7/km^{2} (30.4/sq mi)
- Time zone: UTC+2 (EET)
  - Summer (DST): UTC+3 (EEST)
- Postal code: 511 00
- Area code: +30-2462
- Vehicle registration: PN

Rodia (Greek: Ροδιά, before 1927: Ραδοβίστι – Radovisti) is a village and a community of the Grevena municipality. Before the 2011 local government reform it was a part of the municipality of Grevena, of which it was a municipal district. The 2021 census recorded 151 residents in the village. The community of Rodia covers an area of 12.877 km^{2}.

== See also ==
- List of settlements in the Grevena regional unit
