= Taxiarchis, Grevena =

Taxiarchis Ταξιάρχης
- Community
- Location within Greece
- Coordinates: 40°10.5′N 21°31.4′E
- Country: Greece
- Administrative region: Western Macedonia
- Regional unit: Grevena
- Municipality: Grevena
- Municipal unit: Irakleotes

Area
  - Community: 22.83 km^{2} (8.81 sq mi)
- Elevation: 640 m (2,100 ft)

Population (2021)
  - Community: 200
  - Density: 8.8/km^{2} (23/sq mi)
- Time zone: UTC+2 (EET)
  - Summer (DST): UTC+3 (EEST)
- Postal code: 510 30
- Area code: +30-2462
- Vehicle registration: PN

Taxiarchis (Greek: Ταξιάρχης, before 1919: Κοτσκό – Kotsko, between 1919 and 1927: Κοσκό – Kosko) is a village and a community of the Grevena municipality. Before the 2011 local government reform it was a part of the municipality of Irakleotes, of which it was a municipal district. The 2021 census recorded 200 residents in the village. The community of Taxiarchis covers an area of 22.83 km^{2}.

== See also ==
- List of settlements in the Grevena regional unit
