= Gilofos =

Gilofos Γήλοφος
- Settlement
- Location within Greece
- Coordinates: 39°51.1′N 21°47.7′E
- Country: Greece
- Administrative region: Western Macedonia
- Regional unit: Grevena
- Municipality: Deskati
- Municipal unit: Deskati
- Community: Deskati
- Elevation: 1,050 m (3,440 ft)

Population (2021)
  - Total: 76
- Time zone: UTC+2 (EET)
  - Summer (DST): UTC+3 (EEST)
- Postal code: 512 00
- Area code: +30-2462
- Vehicle registration: PN

Gilofos (Greek: Γήλοφος, before 1927: Τσούκα – Tsouka), is a village of the Deskati municipality. The 2021 census recorded 76 inhabitants in the village. Gilofos is a part of the community of Deskati.

== See also ==
- List of settlements in the Grevena regional unit
