= Mesolakkos =

Mesolakkos Μεσόλακκος
- Settlement
- Location within Greece
- Coordinates: 40°5.1′N 21°30.8′E
- Country: Greece
- Administrative region: Western Macedonia
- Regional unit: Grevena
- Municipality: Grevena
- Municipal unit: Grevena
- Community: Kalochi
- Elevation: 610 m (2,000 ft)

Population (2021)
  - Total: 30
- Time zone: UTC+2 (EET)
  - Summer (DST): UTC+3 (EEST)
- Postal code: 511 00
- Area code: +30-2462
- Vehicle registration: PN

Mesolakkos (Greek: Μεσόλακκος, before 1927: Ζυγόστι – Zygosti) is a village of the Grevena municipality. At the 1997 local government reform it became part of the municipality of Grevena. The 2021 census recorded 30 residents in the village. Mesolakkos is a part of the community of Kalochi.

== See also ==
- List of settlements in the Grevena regional unit
