= Ano Ekklisia =

Ano Ekklisia Άνω Εκκλησία
- Settlement
- Location within Greece
- Coordinates: 40°8.9′N 21°15.8′E
- Country: Greece
- Administrative region: Western Macedonia
- Regional unit: Grevena
- Municipality: Grevena
- Municipal unit: Agios Kosmas
- Community: Agios Kosmas
- Elevation: 1,000 m (3,300 ft)

Population (2021)
  - Total: 19
- Time zone: UTC+2 (EET)
  - Summer (DST): UTC+3 (EEST)
- Postal code: 511 00
- Area code: +30-2462
- Vehicle registration: PN

Ano Ekklisia (Greek: Άνω Εκκλησία) is a village of the Grevena municipality, in Western Macedonia. Before the 2011 local government reform it was a part of the municipality of Agios Kosmas. The 2021 census recorded 19 residents in the village. Ano Ekklisia is a part of the community of Agios Kosmas.

== Name ==
Ano Ekklisia means "Upper Church".

== See also ==
- List of settlements in the Grevena regional unit
