= Palaiochori, Grevena =

Palaiochori Παλαιοχώρι
- Community
- Location within Greece
- Coordinates: 40°2.8′N 21°41.3′E
- Country: Greece
- Administrative region: Western Macedonia
- Regional unit: Grevena
- Municipality: Grevena
- Municipal unit: Ventzio

Area
  - Community: 43.939 km^{2} (16.965 sq mi)
- Elevation: 800 m (2,600 ft)

Population (2021)
  - Community: 188
  - Density: 4.28/km^{2} (11.1/sq mi)
- Time zone: UTC+2 (EET)
  - Summer (DST): UTC+3 (EEST)
- Postal code: 511 00
- Area code: +30-2462
- Vehicle registration: PN

Palaiochori (Greek: Παλαιοχώρι) is a village and a community of the Grevena municipality, Greece. Before the 2011 local government reform it was a part of the municipality of Ventzio, of which it was a municipal district. The 2021 census recorded 188 residents in the village. The community of Palaiochori covers an area of 43.939 km^{2}.

== See also ==
- List of settlements in the Grevena regional unit
