= Agapi, Grevena =

Agapi Αγάπη
- Settlement
- Location within Greece
- Coordinates: 40°3.8′N 21°33.7′E
- Country: Greece
- Administrative region: Western Macedonia
- Regional unit: Grevena
- Municipality: Grevena
- Municipal unit: Grevena
- Community: Kalochi
- Elevation: 490 m (1,610 ft)

Population (2021)
  - Total: 19
- Time zone: UTC+2 (EET)
  - Summer (DST): UTC+3 (EEST)
- Postal code: 511 00
- Area code: +30-2462
- Vehicle registration: PN

Agapi (Greek: Αγάπη, before 1927: Ράτσι – Ratsi) is a village of the Grevena municipality. At the 1997 local government reform it became part of the municipality of Grevena. The 2021 census recorded 19 residents in the village. Agapi is a part of the community of Kalochi.

Following the Greek–Turkish population exchange, Greek refugee families in Ratsi were from Pontus (6) in 1926. The 1928 Greek census recorded 43 village inhabitants. In 1928, the refugee families numbered 7 (25 people).

== See also ==
- List of settlements in the Grevena regional unit
