= Anthrakia =

Anthrakia Ανθρακιά
- Settlement
- Location within Greece
- Coordinates: 39°55.4′N 21°31.3′E
- Country: Greece
- Administrative region: Western Macedonia
- Regional unit: Grevena
- Municipality: Grevena
- Municipal unit: Grevena
- Community: Agioi Theodoroi
- Elevation: 720 m (2,360 ft)

Population (2021)
  - Total: 51
- Time zone: UTC+2 (EET)
  - Summer (DST): UTC+3 (EEST)
- Postal code: 511 00
- Area code: +30-2462
- Vehicle registration: PN

Anthrakia (Greek: Ανθρακιά, before 1927: Μάνες – Manes), is a village of the Grevena municipality. Before the 1997 local government reform it was a part of the community of Agioi Theodoroi. The 2021 census recorded 51 residents in the village.

== See also ==
- List of settlements in the Grevena regional unit
