= Mikrolivado =

Mikrolivado Μικρολίβαδο Labanitsã
- Community
- Location within Greece
- Coordinates: 39°56.9′N 21°14.3′E
- Country: Greece
- Administrative region: Western Macedonia
- Regional unit: Grevena
- Municipality: Grevena
- Municipal unit: Gorgiani

Area
  - Community: 13.851 km^{2} (5.348 sq mi)
- Elevation: 810 m (2,660 ft)

Population (2021)
  - Community: 26
  - Density: 1.9/km^{2} (4.9/sq mi)
- Time zone: UTC+2 (EET)
  - Summer (DST): UTC+3 (EEST)
- Postal code: 510 31
- Area code: +30-2462
- Vehicle registration: PN

Mikrolivado (Greek: Μικρολίβαδο, before 1927: Λαβάνιτσα – Lavanitsa; Aromanian: Labanitsã) is a village and a community of the Grevena municipality. Before the 2011 local government reform it was a part of the municipality of Gorgiani, of which it was a municipal district. The 2021 census recorded 26 residents in the village. The community of Mikrolivado covers an area of 13.851 km^{2}.

Aromanians (Vlachs) and Greeks populated Mikrolivado. Population statistics of the late nineteenth and early twentieth centuries listed Mikrolivado as a Vlach village. In 1904, it was described as Vlach with 15 families by the Orthodox Grevena diocese. Scholars Alan Wace and Maurice Thompson in 1911 visited the region and stated elderly inhabitants of Mikrolivado spoke Aromanian, while the youth were Greek speakers due to assimilation and mixed marriages. Over time the Aromanian population in Mikrolivado was assimilated.

== See also ==
- List of settlements in the Grevena regional unit
