= Polydendro, Grevena =

Polydendro Πολύδενδρο
- Community
- Location within Greece
- Coordinates: 40°13.3′N 21°28.8′E
- Country: Greece
- Administrative region: Western Macedonia
- Regional unit: Grevena
- Municipality: Grevena
- Municipal unit: Irakleotes

Area
  - Community: 10.703 km^{2} (4.132 sq mi)
- Elevation: 660 m (2,170 ft)

Population (2021)
  - Community: 124
  - Density: 11.6/km^{2} (30.0/sq mi)
- Time zone: UTC+2 (EET)
  - Summer (DST): UTC+3 (EEST)
- Postal code: 510 30
- Area code: +30-2462
- Vehicle registration: PN

Polydendro (Greek: Πολύδενδρο, before 1927: Σπάτα – Spata) is a village and a community of the Grevena municipality. Before the 2011 local government reform it was a part of the municipality of Irakleotes, of which it was a municipal district. The 2021 census recorded 124 residents in the village. The community of Polydendro covers an area of 10.703 km^{2}.

== See also ==
- List of settlements in the Grevena regional unit
