= Sitaras =

Sitaras Σιταράς
- Community
- Location within Greece
- Coordinates: 39°56.8′N 21°24.2′E
- Country: Greece
- Administrative region: Western Macedonia
- Regional unit: Grevena
- Municipality: Grevena
- Municipal unit: Gorgiani

Area
  - Community: 10.375 km^{2} (4.006 sq mi)
- Elevation: 770 m (2,530 ft)

Population (2021)
  - Community: 10
  - Density: 0.96/km^{2} (2.5/sq mi)
- Time zone: UTC+2 (EET)
  - Summer (DST): UTC+3 (EEST)
- Postal code: 510 31
- Area code: +30-2462
- Vehicle registration: PN

Sitaras (Greek: Σιταράς, before 1927: Σίτοβο – Sitovo) is a village and a community of the Grevena municipality. Before the 2011 local government reform it was a part of the municipality of Gorgiani, of which it was a municipal district. The 2021 census recorded 10 residents in the village. The community of Sitaras covers an area of 10.375 km^{2}.

== See also ==
- List of settlements in the Grevena regional unit
