= Syndendro =

Syndendro Σύνδενδρο
- Community
- Location within Greece
- Coordinates: 40°7.2′N 21°21.1′E
- Country: Greece
- Administrative region: Western Macedonia
- Regional unit: Grevena
- Municipality: Grevena
- Municipal unit: Grevena

Area
  - Community: 19.229 km^{2} (7.424 sq mi)
- Elevation: 750 m (2,460 ft)

Population (2021)
  - Community: 155
  - Density: 8.06/km^{2} (20.9/sq mi)
- Time zone: UTC+2 (EET)
  - Summer (DST): UTC+3 (EEST)
- Postal code: 511 00
- Area code: +30-2462
- Vehicle registration: PN

Syndendro (Greek: Σύνδενδρο, before 1919: Τεβρέν – Tevren, between 1919 and 1927: Τριβένι – Triveni) is a village and a community of the Grevena municipality. Before the 2011 local government reform it was a part of the municipality of Grevena, of which it was a municipal district. The 2021 census recorded 155 residents in the village. The community of Syndendro covers an area of 19.229 km^{2}.

According to the statistics of Vasil Kanchov ("Macedonia, Ethnography and Statistics"), 120 Greek Christians, and 150 Muslim Albanians lived in the village in 1900.

Tevren was a mixed village and a part of its population were Greek speaking Muslim Vallahades. The 1920 Greek census recorded 567 people in the village, and 180 inhabitants (50 families) were Muslim in 1923. Following the Greek–Turkish population exchange, Greek refugee families in Tevren were from Asia Minor (2) and Pontus (61) in 1926. The 1928 Greek census recorded 538 village inhabitants. In 1928, the refugee families numbered 63 (193 people).

== See also ==
- List of settlements in the Grevena regional unit
