= Pontini =

Pontini Ποντινή
- Community
- Location within Greece
- Coordinates: 40°4.3′N 21°40.7′E
- Country: Greece
- Administrative region: Western Macedonia
- Regional unit: Grevena
- Municipality: Grevena
- Municipal unit: Ventzio

Area
  - Community: 33.573 km^{2} (12.963 sq mi)
- Elevation: 830 m (2,720 ft)

Population (2021)
  - Community: 166
  - Density: 4.94/km^{2} (12.8/sq mi)
- Time zone: UTC+2 (EET)
  - Summer (DST): UTC+3 (EEST)
- Postal code: 511 00
- Area code: +30-2462
- Vehicle registration: PN

Pontini (Greek: Ποντινή, before 1927: Τόριστα – Torista) is a village and a community of the Grevena municipality. Before the 2011 local government reform it was a part of the municipality of Ventzio, of which it was a municipal district. The 2021 census recorded 166 residents in the village. The community of Pontini covers an area of 33.573 km^{2}.

Torista was populated by Greek speaking Muslim Vallahades. The 1920 Greek census recorded 504 people in the village, and 500 inhabitants (85 families) were Muslim in 1923. Following the Greek–Turkish population exchange, Greek refugee families in Torista were from Pontus (73) in 1926. The 1928 Greek census recorded 285 village inhabitants. In 1928, the refugee families numbered 75 (280 people).

== See also ==
- List of settlements in the Grevena regional unit
