= Aimilianos =

Aimilianos Αιμιλιανός
- Settlement
- Location within Greece
- Coordinates: 39°57.7′N 21°26.4′E
- Country: Greece
- Administrative region: Western Macedonia
- Regional unit: Grevena
- Municipality: Grevena
- Municipal unit: Grevena
- Community: Agioi Theodoroi
- Elevation: 840 m (2,760 ft)

Population (2021)
  - Total: 30
- Time zone: UTC+2 (EET)
  - Summer (DST): UTC+3 (EEST)
- Postal code: 511 00
- Area code: +30-2462
- Vehicle registration: PN

Aimilianos (Greek: Αιμιλιανός, before 1927: Γκριντάδες – Gkrintades) is a village in the municipality of Grevena, northern Greece. Before the local government was reformed in 1997, it was a part of the community of Agioi Theodoroi. As of 2021, there are 30 residents in the village. Aimilianos is a part of the local community of Agioi Theodoroi.

== See also ==
- List of settlements in the Grevena regional unit
