= Filippaioi =

Filippaioi Φιλιππαίοι
- Municipal unit
- Location within the regional unit

- Location within Greece
- Coordinates: 40°05′N 21°09′E
- Country: Greece
- Administrative region: Western Macedonia
- Regional unit: Grevena
- Municipality: Grevena

Area
  - Municipal unit: 25.517 km^{2} (9.852 sq mi)
- Elevation: 1,207 m (3,960 ft)

Population (2021)
  - Municipal unit: 33
  - Municipal unit density: 1.3/km^{2} (3.3/sq mi)
- Time zone: UTC+2 (EET)
  - Summer (DST): UTC+3 (EEST)
- Vehicle registration: ΡΝ

Filippaioi (Greek: Φιλιππαίοι) is a village and a former community in Grevena regional unit, West Macedonia, Greece. Since the 2011 local government reform it is part of the municipality Grevena, of which it is a municipal unit. The community of Filippaioi, which consists of the villages of Filippaioi, Aetia and Kourouna, has 33 inhabitants as of 2021. The municipal unit has an area of 25.517 km^{2}.
