= Dotsiko =

Dotsiko Δοτσικό
- Municipal unit
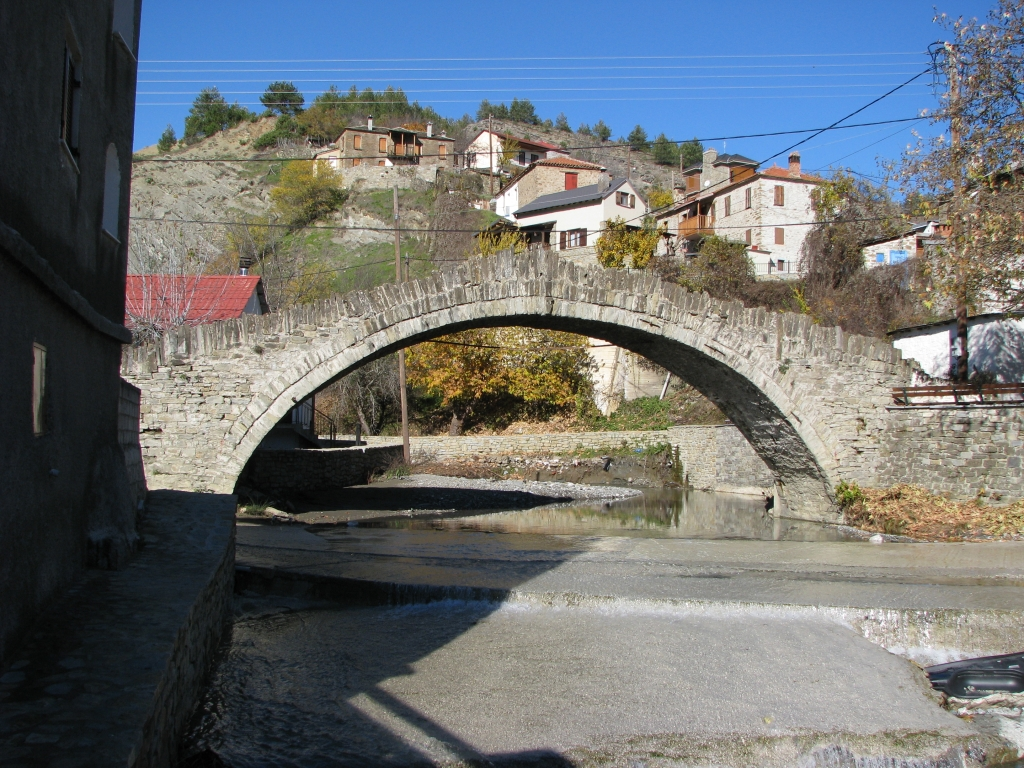
- Old bridge in Dotsiko

- Location within the regional unit

- Location within Greece
- Coordinates: 40°08′N 21°08′E
- Country: Greece
- Administrative region: Western Macedonia
- Regional unit: Grevena
- Municipality: Grevena

Area
  - Municipal unit: 30.265 km^{2} (11.685 sq mi)
- Elevation: 1,060 m (3,480 ft)

Population (2021)
  - Municipal unit: 21
  - Municipal unit density: 0.69/km^{2} (1.8/sq mi)
- Time zone: UTC+2 (EET)
  - Summer (DST): UTC+3 (EEST)
- Postal code: 510 32
- Area code: 24620
- Vehicle registration: ΡΝ

Dotsiko (Greek: Δοτσικό) is a village and a former community in Grevena regional unit, West Macedonia, Greece. Since the 2011 local government reform it is part of the municipality Grevena, of which it is a municipal unit. The village had 21 inhabitants in 2021. The municipal unit has an area of 30.265 km^{2}.
