= Gorgiani =

Gorgiani Γόργιανη
- Municipal unit
- Location within the regional unit

- Location within Greece
- Coordinates: 39°56′N 21°20′E
- Country: Greece
- Administrative region: Western Macedonia
- Regional unit: Grevena
- Municipality: Grevena

Area
  - Municipal unit: 204.555 km^{2} (78.979 sq mi)

Population (2021)
  - Municipal unit: 514
  - Municipal unit density: 2.51/km^{2} (6.51/sq mi)
- Time zone: UTC+2 (EET)
  - Summer (DST): UTC+3 (EEST)
- Postal code: 510 31
- Area code: +30-2462
- Vehicle registration: PN

Gorgiani (Greek: Γόργιανη) is a municipal unit of the Grevena municipality. Before the 2011 local government reform it was a municipality of its own. The 2021 census recorded 514 residents in the municipal unit. Gorgiani covers an area of 204.555 km^{2}. The seat of the municipality was in Kipoureio.

== See also ==
- List of settlements in the Grevena regional unit
