= Irakleotes =

Irakleotes Ηρακλεώτες
- Municipal unit
- Location within the regional unit

- Location within Greece
- Coordinates: 40°12′N 21°25′E
- Country: Greece
- Administrative region: Western Macedonia
- Regional unit: Grevena
- Municipality: Grevena

Area
  - Municipal unit: 136.631 km^{2} (52.754 sq mi)
- Elevation: 705 m (2,313 ft)

Population (2021)
  - Municipal unit: 1,384
  - Municipal unit density: 10.13/km^{2} (26.24/sq mi)
- Time zone: UTC+2 (EET)
  - Summer (DST): UTC+3 (EEST)
- Postal code: 510 30, 511 00
- Area code: +30-2462
- Vehicle registration: PN

Irakleotes (Greek: Ηρακλεώτες) is a municipal unit of the Grevena municipality. Before the 2011 local government reform, it was an independent municipality. The seat of the municipality was in Agios Georgios. Irakleotes covers an area of 136.631 km^{2}.

== Population ==
Historical population
| Year | Pop. | ±% |
|---|---|---|
| 2001 | 2,418 | — |
| 2011 | 1,890 | −21.8% |
| 2021 | 1,384 | −26.8% |
