= Theodoros Ziakas (municipality) =

Theodoros Ziakas Θεόδωρος Ζιάκας
- Municipal unit
- Location within the regional unit

- Location within Greece
- Coordinates: 40°02′N 21°20′E
- Country: Greece
- Administrative region: Western Macedonia
- Regional unit: Grevena
- Municipality: Grevena

Area
  - Municipal unit: 241.768 km^{2} (93.347 sq mi)

Population (2021)
  - Municipal unit: 1,012
  - Municipal unit density: 4.186/km^{2} (10.84/sq mi)
- Time zone: UTC+2 (EET)
  - Summer (DST): UTC+3 (EEST)
- Postal code: 510 32, 511 00
- Area code: +30-2462
- Vehicle registration: PN

Theodoros Ziakas (Greek: Θεόδωρος Ζιάκας) is a municipal unit of the Grevena municipality. Before the 2011 local government reform it was an independent municipality. The 2021 census recorded 1,012 residents in the municipal unit. Theodoros Ziakas covers an area of 241.768 km^{2}. The seat of the municipality was in Mavranaioi.

== Name ==
It was named after Theodoros Ziakas, a 19th-century leader of the Greek struggle for independence.

== See also ==
- List of settlements in the Grevena regional unit
