= Grevena (regional unit) =

Grevena Περιφερειακή ενότητα Γρεβενών
- Regional unit
- Municipalities of Grevena

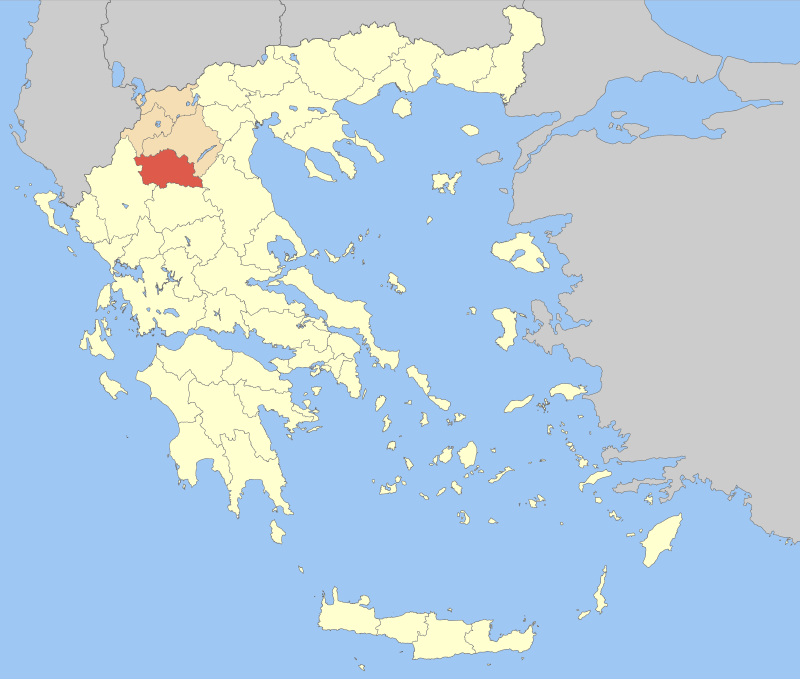
- Grevena within Greece

- Location within Greece
- Coordinates: 40°0′N 21°20′E
- Country: Greece
- Geographic region: Macedonia
- Administrative region: Western Macedonia
- Seat: Grevena

Area
  - Total: 2,291 km^{2} (885 sq mi)

Population (2021)
  - Total: 26,576
  - Density: 11.60/km^{2} (30.04/sq mi)
- Time zone: UTC+2 (EET)
  - Summer (DST): UTC+3 (EEST)
- Postal code: 51x xx
- Area code: 24620, 24920
- Vehicle registration: ΡΝ
- Website: www.grevena.gr

Grevena (Greek: Περιφερειακή Ενότητα Γρεβενών, Perifereiakí Enótita Grevenón) is one of the regional units of Greece. It is part of the region of Western Macedonia. Its capital is the town of Grevena.

== Geography ==
Grevena borders the regional units of Ioannina (Epirus) to the west, Kastoria to the northwest, Kozani to the north and east, Larissa to the southeast and Trikala to the south.

The Pindus mountains cover the western part of the regional unit. Other mountain ranges are Chasia in the south and Vourinos in the northeast. The longest river is Aliakmon which flows in the north and the east.

== Administration ==
The regional unit Grevena is subdivided into 2 municipalities. These are (number as in the map in the infobox):

- Deskati (2)
- Grevena (1)

=== Prefecture ===
Grevena was created as a prefecture (Greek: Νομός Γρεβενών) in 1964, out of parts of the prefectures of Kozani and Larissa. As a part of the 2011 Kallikratis government reform, the regional unit Grevena was created out of the former prefecture Grevena. The prefecture had the same territory as the present regional unit. At the same time, the municipalities were reorganised, according to the table below.

New municipality	Old municipalities	Seat
Deskati	Deskati	Deskati
Deskati	Chasia	Deskati
Grevena	Grevena	Grevena
Grevena	Avdella	Grevena
Grevena	Kosmas o Aitolos/Agios Kosmas	Grevena
Grevena	Ventzio	Grevena
Grevena	Gorgiani	Grevena
Grevena	Dotsiko	Grevena
Grevena	Irakleotes	Grevena
Grevena	Theodoros Ziakas	Grevena
Grevena	Mesolouri	Grevena
Grevena	Perivoli	Grevena
Grevena	Samarina	Grevena
Grevena	Smixi	Grevena
Grevena	Filippaioi	Grevena

== Economy ==
The region's economy relies on farming and agriculture. Wheat and legume crops (mostly chickpeas) cover most of the cultivated areas. Livestock production (including goat and lamb) is also strong. An increasing portion of the farming output is produced under organic farming or low input practices. Other main sources of income include ecotourism, forest industry and the ski resort of Vasilitsa, which is a popular destination for winter holidays.

=== Transport ===
The A2 and A3 motorways pass through the Grevena regional unit, along with the EO15 and EO26 national roads: there are no railways in the unit.

== Demography ==
At the 2001 Greek census, Grevena was the least densely populated prefecture in Greece. Grevena has one of the highest rates of population decline in Greece. In 2006, there were 225 births (urban areas-160, semiurban-28 & rural -37) and 393 deaths (urban-96, semiurban-42 and rural-255). In rural areas, death rate was about 7 times the birth rate.

== Archaeology ==
The regional unit of Grevena is rich in archaeological sites that were discovered along the years.

== See also ==
- List of settlements in the Grevena regional unit
- Slavic toponyms of places in Grevena Prefecture
