= Agios Dimitrios (disambiguation) =

Agios Dimitrios (Greek: Άγιος Δημήτριος, "St. Demetrius") may refer to:

== Churches ==
- Hagios Demetrios, a palaeo-Christian basilica and UNESCO heritage site in Thessaloniki

== Places ==
- Agios Dimitrios, a suburb of Athens, Greece
- Hagios Demetrios, later known in English as Seraglio Point, one of the quarters of Constantinople, the capital of the Byzantine Empire
- Agios Dimitrios, Aetolia-Acarnania, a village in the municipality of Nafpaktia, Aetolia-Acarnania, Greece
- Agios Dimitrios, Argolis, a village in the municipality of Epidaurus, Argolis, Greece
- Agios Dimitrios, Boeotia, a village in the municipality of Orchomenus, Boeotia, Greece
- Agios Dimitrios, Cephalonia, a village in the Paliki peninsula in Cephalonia, Greece
- Agios Dimitrios, Elis, a village in Elis, Greece
- Agios Dimitrios, Euboea, a village in the municipality of Karystos, Euboea, Greece
- Agios Dimitrios, Evrytania, a village in the municipality of Agrafa, Evrytania, Greece
- Agios Dimitrios, Ioannina, a municipal unit in the Ioannina regional unit, Greece
- Agios Dimitrios, Karditsa, a village in the municipality of Palamas, Karditsa regional unit, Greece
- Agios Dimitrios, Kozani, a village in the municipality of Kozani, Kozani regional unit, Greece
- Agios Dimitrios, Evrotas, a village in the municipality of Evrotas, Laconia regional unit, Greece
- Agios Dimitrios, Monemvasia, a village in the municipality of Monemvasia, Laconia regional unit, Greece
- Agios Dimitrios, Lemnos, a village on the island of Lemnos, Greece
- Agios Dimitrios, Patras, a neighbourhood in Patras, Greece
- Agios Dimitrios Piliou, a village in the municipality of Zagora-Mouresi, Magnesia regional unit, Greece
- Agios Dimitrios, Pieria, a village in the municipality of Katerini, Pieria regional unit, Greece
- Agios Dimitrios, Serres, a village in the municipality of Visaltia, Serres regional unit, Greece
- Agios Dimitrios, Trikala, a village in the municipality of Meteora, Trikala regional unit, Greece
- Agios Dimitrios, Zakynthos, a village on the island of Zakynthos, Greece
- Agios Dimitrios, Cyprus
- Kalavassos, Cyprus
- Paliochora, a ruined village on the island of Cythera in southern Greece

== Other ==
- St. Demetrios School, the largest Greek-American school in the United States.
