= Hassia (disambiguation) =

Hassia (or Chasia) is a mountain in northern Greece.

Hassia may also refer to:

- Hassia Levy-Agron, an Israeli dancer, choreographer, and educator
- Hassia, Grevena (or Chasia), a former municipality in Grevena regional unit, West Macedonia, Greece
- Hassia, Trikala (or Chasia), a former municipality in the Trikala regional unit, Thessaly, Greece\
- Hassium tetroxide, via the *-ia terminology for metal oxides
