= Chasia (disambiguation) =

Chasia is a mountain in northern Greece.

Chasia may also refer to the following places in Greece:

- Chasia, Grevena, a municipal unit in the Grevena regional unit
- Chasia, Trikala, a municipal unit in the Trikala regional unit
- Fyli, a town in Attica, formerly known as Chasia
