= Agios Dimitrios, Trikala =

Agios Dimitrios Άγιος Δημήτριος
- Settlement
- Location within Greece
- Coordinates: 39°46′23″N 21°32′53″E
- Country: Greece
- Administrative region: Thessaly
- Regional unit: Trikala
- Municipality: Meteora
- Municipal unit: Chasia
- Community: Gavros
- Elevation: 350 m (1,150 ft)

Population (2021)
  - Total: 97
- Time zone: UTC+2 (EET)
  - Summer (DST): UTC+3 (EEST)

Agios Dimitrios (Greek: Άγιος Δημήτριος) is a village in Meteora municipality, Thessaly, Greece. It is located just to the northwest of Kalambaka town and the Meteora monastery complex. It is part of the community Gavros. As of the 2021 Greek census, Agios Dimitrios had a resident population of 97.

== Geography ==
Agios Dimitrios is a settlement located in a hilly area at the western foot of Antichasia Range. The village is surrounded by rocks that are an extension of the Meteora rock formation of Kalabaka. It is located near the east bank of the Mykani (Μύκανη) River and east of the Servia-Elati provincial road (E-15), at an average altitude of 356 m. It is located about 38 km northwest of Trikala.

== See also ==
- Chasia
- Antichasia
