= Dimitra, Grevena =

Dimitra Δήμητρα
- Settlement
- Location within Greece
- Coordinates: 39°56.8′N 21°39.8′E
- Country: Greece
- Administrative region: Western Macedonia
- Regional unit: Grevena
- Municipality: Deskati
- Municipal unit: Chasia
- Community: Karpero
- Elevation: 450 m (1,480 ft)

Population (2021)
  - Total: 306
- Time zone: UTC+2 (EET)
  - Summer (DST): UTC+3 (EEST)
- Postal code: 511 00
- Area code: +30-2462
- Vehicle registration: PN

Dimitra (Greek: Δήμητρα, before 1961: Αράπης – Arapis) is a village of the Deskati municipality. Before the 2011 local government reform it was part of the municipality of Chasia. The 2021 census recorded 306 inhabitants in the village. Dimitra is a part of the community of Karpero.

The 1920 Greek census recorded 159 people in the village. Following the Greek–Turkish population exchange, Greek refugee families in Arapis were from Pontus (32) in 1926. The 1928 Greek census recorded 284 village inhabitants. In 1928, the refugee families numbered 32 (113 people).

== See also ==
- List of settlements in the Grevena regional unit
