= Anoixi, Grevena =

Anoixi Άνοιξη
- Settlement
- Location within Greece
- Coordinates: 39°54.8′N 21°34.4′E
- Country: Greece
- Administrative region: Western Macedonia
- Regional unit: Grevena
- Municipality: Deskati
- Municipal unit: Chasia
- Community: Trikokkia
- Elevation: 550 m (1,800 ft)

Population (2021)
  - Total: 96
- Time zone: UTC+2 (EET)
  - Summer (DST): UTC+3 (EEST)
- Postal code: 511 00
- Area code: +30-2462
- Vehicle registration: PN

Anoixi (Greek: Άνοιξη, before 1927: Γκρέση – Gkresi, between 1927 and 1961: Γριά – Gria) is a village of the Deskati municipality. Before the 2011 local government reform, it was part of the municipality of Chasia. The 2021 census recorded 96 inhabitants in the village. Anoixi is a part of the Trikokkia community.

The 1920 Greek census recorded 11 people in the village. Following the Greek–Turkish population exchange, Greek refugee families in Gkresi were from Pontus (35) in 1926. The 1928 Greek census recorded 145 village inhabitants. In 1928, the refugee families numbered 34 (105 people).

== See also ==
- List of settlements in the Grevena regional unit
