= Elafi, Kozani =

Elafi
- Settlement
- Location within Greece
- Coordinates: 39°59′02″N 21°34′01″E
- Country: Greece
- Geographic region: Macedonia
- Administrative region: Western Macedonia
- Regional unit: Grevena
- Municipality: Deskati
- Municipal unit: Chasia
- Community: Karpero
- Time zone: UTC+2 (EET)
  - Summer (DST): UTC+3 (EEST)
- Vehicle registration: ΚΖ

Elafi (Greek: Ελάφι, before 1928: Πινιάρ – Piniar) was a village in Grevena Regional Unit, Macedonia, Greece. It was part of the community of Karpero.

Following the Greek–Turkish population exchange, Greek refugee families in Piniar were from Pontus (42) in 1926. The 1928 Greek census recorded 118 village inhabitants. In 1928, the refugee families numbered 41 (123 people). The village was abolished on 7 April 1951.

== See also ==
- List of settlements in the Grevena regional unit
