= Trifylli =

Trifylli may refer to the following places in Greece:

- Trifylli, Evros, part of the municipality Alexandroupoli in the Evros regional unit
- Trifylli, Grevena, part of the municipality Deskati in the Grevena regional unit
