= Gavros, Trikala =

Gavros Γάβρος
- Settlement
- Location within Greece
- Coordinates: 39°47′46″N 21°35′42″E
- Country: Greece
- Administrative region: Thessaly
- Regional unit: Trikala
- Municipality: Meteora
- Municipal unit: Chasia
- Elevation: 476 m (1,562 ft)

Population (2021)
  - Community: 245
- Time zone: UTC+2 (EET)
  - Summer (DST): UTC+3 (EEST)
- Postal code: 42200

Gavros (Greek: Γάβρος) is a village in Meteora municipality, Thessaly, Greece. Until 2010, Gavros was part of the former municipality of Chasia.

== Geography ==
The village is located between the mountain ranges of Chasia and Antichasia. It is about 25 km northwest of Kalabaka town. Gavros is surrounded by rocks that are an extension of the Meteora rock formation of Kalabaka. It is located at an altitude of 476 meters above sea level.

== Monasteries ==
Historic rock monasteries around Gavros include the Monastery of St. Nicholas (Μονύδριο Αγίου Νικολάου) in a cave at Paliokastro (Παλιόκαστρο) Rock, the Monastery of St. Theodosios (Μονύδριο Αγίου Θεοδοσίου) on the southern banks of the Ion River, and the Monastery of the "Life-Giving" Virgin Mary (Μονύδριο της Παναγίας Ζωοδόχου Πηγής).
