= Gavros =

Gavros may refer to:

- Gavros, Aetolia-Acarnania, a village in the municipal unit Pyllini, Aetolia-Acarnania, Greece
- Gavros, Kastoria, an abandoned village in Kastoria regional unit, Greece
- Gavros, Trikala, a village in the municipality Kalampaka, Trikala regional unit, Greece
- Gavros, a Roman cognomen
- Olympiacos F.C., a Greek football club from Piraeus, nicknamed gavros
