= Katakali, Grevena =

Katakali Κατάκαλη
- Community
- Location within Greece
- Coordinates: 39°54.1′N 21°41.2′E
- Country: Greece
- Administrative region: Western Macedonia
- Regional unit: Grevena
- Municipality: Deskati
- Municipal unit: Chasia

Area
  - Community: 15.974 km^{2} (6.168 sq mi)
- Elevation: 525 m (1,722 ft)

Population (2021)
  - Community: 162
  - Density: 10.1/km^{2} (26.3/sq mi)
- Time zone: UTC+2 (EET)
  - Summer (DST): UTC+3 (EEST)
- Postal code: 511 00
- Area code: +30-2462
- Vehicle registration: PN

Katakali (Greek: Κατάκαλη) is a village and a community of the Deskati municipality. Before the 2011 local government reforms it was part of the municipality of Chasia, of which it was a municipal district. The 2021 census recorded 162 inhabitants in the village. The community of Katakali covers an area of 15.974 km^{2}.

== See also ==
- List of settlements in the Grevena regional unit
