= Paliouria =

Paliouria Παλιουριά
- Community
- Location within Greece
- Coordinates: 39°57′N 21°43′E
- Country: Greece
- Administrative region: Western Macedonia
- Regional unit: Grevena
- Municipality: Deskati
- Municipal unit: Deskati

Population (2021)
  - Community: 325
- Time zone: UTC+2 (EET)
  - Summer (DST): UTC+3 (EEST)

Paliouria (Greek: Παλιουριά, before 1928: Ζημνιάτσι – Zimniatsi) is a village in northern Greece. It is located at the root of the west end of the Kamvounia (Καμβούνια) mountain chain, near the Haliacmon river. Its altitude is 500 m. It is part of the municipality Deskati, in the Grevena regional unit. It is located 50 km from Grevena and 15 km from Deskati. The native population calls Kamvounia by the names of Vounasia (Βουνάσια) or Bounassia (Μπουνάσσια). Paliouria has a resident population of 325 people (2021).

== History ==
At the current location of the village, the Turkish road (named Jadés, lasting from 1881 to 1912) from Servia crossed with the road coming from Elassona - Deskati - Grevena. Through the northside of the village, in the Byzantine period of Emperor Basil II the Bulgarslayer, existed a road suitable for transportation with mules. According to the tradition, Zimniatsi (the old name for Paliouria) was formed from the union of 9 local settlements into one, in the Ottoman rule period. This was made in order for the villagers to protect themselves from the Turks. Each one of the settlements had its own parish. With time, those establishments have disappeared, and only presumptions can be made for the location of some of them.

After the annexation of Macedonia into Greece, in 1918 Zimniatsi was integrated in the community of Karpero. In 1928, Zimniatsi was renamed to Paliouria. It was declared a community in 1963 and today it is in the jurisdiction of the Municipality of Deskati. Until 1927 the village was populated by native stock farmers. After the Greco-Turkish War (1919-1922), refugees came from Minor Asia and Pontos. With the refugees' advent, the physiognomy of the village changed, as the newcomers settled down in a separate area, at the one side of the village.

== Local economy ==
The village people are mostly farmers, who cultivate corn, wheat and tobacco crops. A considerable number of them are dealing with stock farming (cows, sheep, goats) and they have created relevant modern units. The community merchandising revolves around small local businesses.

== Sightseeing ==
Beautiful and old churches exist around Paliouria:

- The Holy Trinity, at 500 m distance, NE of the village
- Saint George, 1 km, SE
- Saint Paraskevi, 1 km, SE
- Saint Kyriaki, 1.5 km, W

In the village, there is the church of Zoodochos Pigi, which has been categorized as an archaeological monument.
