= Trikokkia =

Trikokkia Τρικοκκιά
- Community
- Location within Greece
- Coordinates: 39°52.7′N 21°37.2′E
- Country: Greece
- Administrative region: Western Macedonia
- Regional unit: Grevena
- Municipality: Deskati
- Municipal unit: Chasia

Area
  - Community: 68.646 km^{2} (26.504 sq mi)
- Elevation: 546 m (1,791 ft)

Population (2021)
  - Community: 379
  - Density: 5.52/km^{2} (14.3/sq mi)
- Time zone: UTC+2 (EET)
  - Summer (DST): UTC+3 (EEST)
- Postal code: 511 00
- Area code: +30-2462
- Vehicle registration: PN

Trikokkia (Greek: Τρικοκκιά, before 1927: Τσαπουρνιά – Tsapournia) is a village and a community of the Deskati municipality. Before the 2011 local government reform it was part of the municipality of Chasia, of which it was a municipal district. The 2021 census recorded 379 inhabitants in the community. The community of Trikokkia covers an area of 68.646 km^{2}.

== Administrative division ==
The community of Trikokkia consists of 3 settlements:

- Anoixi (population 96 as of 2021)
- Trifylli (population 103)
- Trikokkia (population 180)

== See also ==
- List of settlements in the Grevena regional unit
