= Trifylli, Grevena =

Trifylli Τριφύλλι
- Settlement
- Location within Greece
- Coordinates: 39°53.4′N 21°38.8′E
- Country: Greece
- Administrative region: Western Macedonia
- Regional unit: Grevena
- Municipality: Deskati
- Municipal unit: Chasia
- Community: Trikokkia
- Elevation: 480 m (1,570 ft)

Population (2021)
  - Total: 103
- Time zone: UTC+2 (EET)
  - Summer (DST): UTC+3 (EEST)
- Postal code: 511 00
- Area code: +30-2462
- Vehicle registration: PN

Trifylli (Greek: Τριφύλλι, before 1927: Σύνιστα – Synista) is a village of the Deskati municipality. Before the 2011 local government reform it was part of the municipality of Chasia. The 2021 census recorded 103 inhabitants in the village. Trifylli is a part of the community of Trikokkia.

== See also ==
- List of settlements in the Grevena regional unit
