= Tymfaia =

Tymfaia Τυμφαία
- Municipal unit
- Location within the regional unit

- Location within Greece
- Coordinates: 39°47′N 21°48′E
- Country: Greece
- Administrative region: Thessaly
- Regional unit: Trikala
- Municipality: Meteora

Area
  - Municipal unit: 262.5 km^{2} (101.4 sq mi)

Population (2021)
  - Municipal unit: 898
  - Municipal unit density: 3.42/km^{2} (8.86/sq mi)
- Time zone: UTC+2 (EET)
  - Summer (DST): UTC+3 (EEST)
- Vehicle registration: ΤΚ

Tymfaia (Greek: Τυμφαία) is a former municipality in the Trikala regional unit, Thessaly, Greece, named after Tymphaea ancient district of Macedonia region. Since the 2011 local government reform it is part of the municipality Meteora, of which it is a municipal unit. The municipal unit has an area of 262.523 km^{2}. Population 898 (2021). The seat of the municipality was in Koniskos.
