= Benedict of Porto e Santa Rufina (died 1216) =

Benedict (Italian: Benedetto, Latin: Benedictus; died 1216) was a Roman Catholic cardinal who served as the apostolic legate to the Latin Empire from 1205 until 1207.

Benedict became the cardinal deacon of Santa Maria in Domnica in 1200. He subscribed his first papal bull as a witness on 11 November 1200. In 1201, he was promoted to cardinal priest of Santa Susanna. He first subscribed a bull with his new title on 23 November 1201.

In 1205, Pope Innocent III named him his legate to the Emperor Baldwin I of Constantinople, who died in April. He arrived in Constantinople late in 1205 or early in 1206 and replaced the legate Peter of Capua. Accompanying him was the bilingual south Italian monk Nicholas of Otranto as a translator. He was charged with making sure that the Venetian-born Latin patriarch, Thomas Morosini, did not overly favour Venetians with benefices. He mediated the agreement between Thomas and Henry of Flanders that led to Henry's coronation as emperor in August 1206. Benedict tried to retain in the east the army that had come on the Fourth Crusade to defend the nascent Latin Empire. He granted the monastery of Hosios Loukas and the church of Hagios Demetrios to the canons of the Holy Sepulchre, not without controversy. He also sought to end the Great Schism of 1054 by bringing the Greek church into union with Rome. He held talks with Greek prelates in Thessaloniki and Constantinople. Although Benedict did not interfere with Byzantine rites and showed tolerance to the Greek church, reunion was not forthcoming.

Benedict returned to Italy in September 1207. His last papal bull as a cardinal priest is dated 20 April 1212. Later that year or in 1213, he was promoted cardinal bishop of Porto e Santa Rufina. He subscribed bulls as a cardinal bishop between 26 October 1213 and 7 March 1216. He took part in the papal election of 18 July 1216. He died shortly after at Rome.

== Bibliography ==
- Angold, Michael (2019). "Thomas Morosini, First Latin Patriarch of Constantinople (1205–1211): A Re-appraisal". In Sophia Menache; Benjamin Z. Kedar; Michel Balard (eds.). Crusading and Trading Between West and East: Studies in Honour of David Jacoby. Routledge. pp. 17–34.
- Miranda, Salvador (2021) [1998]. "Pope Innocent III (1198–1216): Consistory of December 1200 (II), Celebrated in Rome". The Cardinals of the Holy Roman Church: Biographical Dictionary. Florida International University Libraries.
- Morton, James (2021). Byzantine Religious Law in Medieval Italy. Oxford University Press.
- Van Tricht, Filip (2011). The Latin Renovatio of Byzantium: The Empire of Constantinople (1204–1228). Brill.
- Wolff, Robert L. (1954). "Politics in the Latin Patriarchate of Constantinople, 1204–1261". Dumbarton Oaks Papers. 8: 225–303. doi:10.2307/1291068. JSTOR 1291068.
