= Nikolaos of Otranto =

Greek monk and philosopher (1155/60–1235)

Nikolaos of Otranto (c. 1155/60, Otranto – 9 February 1235), also known as Nektarios of Casole, was a Greek abbot and author.

== Biography ==
Nikolaos was probably born around 1155/60. There is no record of where he received his considerable education, but it may have been at the monastery of Casole, a very important centre of Greek erudition in Apulia located only a few kilometres outside Otranto. He became hieromonk of that monastery no later than 1205, after working as a lay teacher of Greek in his hometown. Due to his mastery of both Latin and Greek, he served as interpreter for Cardinal Benedict of Santa Susanna in 1205/7 and Cardinal Pelagius of Albano in 1214/5, accompanying each to the Latin Empire of Constantinople for talks concerning ecclesiastical union. In 1223/4, he was part of a diplomatic mission sent by Emperor Frederick II to the Byzantine court at Nicaea, and in 1232 he represented the Greek churches of Apulia at the Papal Curia in 1232.

Nikolaos translated several texts, mostly liturgical, from Greek into Latin and vice versa; examples include the Basileios liturgy and the explanation of the liturgy written by Patriarch Germanos I of Constantinople. His other writings include original poems and letters.

== Main works ==
- The "Art of the Chisel", a collection of texts concerning various methods of divination. Nikolaos translated a Latin version of the Arabic original into Greek, and added an introduction regarding the limits of divination in Christianity.
- Three "Syntagmata" in Greek and Latin directed against the Latin church, including several supplements. In particular, Nikolaos argued against the filioque, the use of unleavened bread (azymes) for the Eucharist, and various other liturgical and disciplinary divergences.
- The "Disputation against the Jews". This is a fictional dialogue, albeit supposedly based on real discussions between the author and a Jew. It is not only the largest and most erudite of Nikolaos' works, but also one of the most elaborate Byzantine examples of the genre.
