= Paraskevi, Grevena =

Paraskevi Παρασκευή
- Community
- Location within Greece
- Coordinates: 39°54.6′N 21°46.2′E
- Country: Greece
- Administrative region: Western Macedonia
- Regional unit: Grevena
- Municipality: Deskati
- Municipal unit: Deskati

Area
  - Community: 19.923 km^{2} (7.692 sq mi)
- Elevation: 780 m (2,560 ft)

Population (2021)
  - Community: 91
  - Density: 4.6/km^{2} (12/sq mi)
- Time zone: UTC+2 (EET)
  - Summer (DST): UTC+3 (EEST)
- Postal code: 512 00
- Area code: +30-2462
- Vehicle registration: PN

Paraskevi (Greek: Παρασκευή) is a village and a community of the Deskati municipality. Before the 2011 local government reform it was part of the municipality of Deskati, of which it was a municipal district. The 2021 census recorded 91 inhabitants in the village. The community of Paraskevi covers an area of 19.923 km^{2}.

== See also ==
- List of settlements in the Grevena regional unit
