= Koniskos =

Koniskos Κονισκός
- Community
- Location within Greece
- Coordinates: 39°46′N 21°47′E
- Country: Greece
- Administrative region: Thessaly
- Regional unit: Trikala
- Municipality: Meteora
- Municipal unit: Tymfaia
- Elevation: 820 m (2,690 ft)

Population (2021)
  - Community: 185
- Time zone: UTC+2 (EET)
  - Summer (DST): UTC+3 (EEST)
- Postal code: 420 34

Koniskos (Greek: Κονισκός) is a village in the southwestern Trikala regional unit, Greece. It was the seat of the municipality of Tymfaia. In 2021 the community of Koniskos (including the village Kalochori) had a population of 185. It is located in the Antichasia mountains, 25 km north of the city of Trikala, and 17 km northeast of Kalambaka.

== Population ==
Year	Settlement population	Community population
1981	437	-
1991	192	-
2001	262	383
2011	196	294
2021	96	185

== See also ==
- List of settlements in the Trikala regional unit
