= Agios Georgios, Deskati =

Agios Georgios Άγιος Γεώργιος
- Settlement
- Location within Greece
- Coordinates: 39°52.3′N 21°46′E
- Country: Greece
- Administrative region: Western Macedonia
- Regional unit: Grevena
- Municipality: Deskati
- Municipal unit: Deskati
- Community: Deskati
- Elevation: 780 m (2,560 ft)

Population (2021)
  - Total: 7
- Time zone: UTC+2 (EET)
  - Summer (DST): UTC+3 (EEST)
- Postal code: 512 00
- Area code: +30-2462
- Vehicle registration: PN

Agios Georgios (Greek: Άγιος Γεώργιος) is a village of the Deskati municipality. The 2021 census found 7 inhabitants in the village. Agios Georgios is a part of the community of Deskati.

== See also ==
- List of settlements in the Grevena regional unit
