= Agios Dimitrios, Cyprus =

Agios Dimitrios Άγιος Δημήτριος
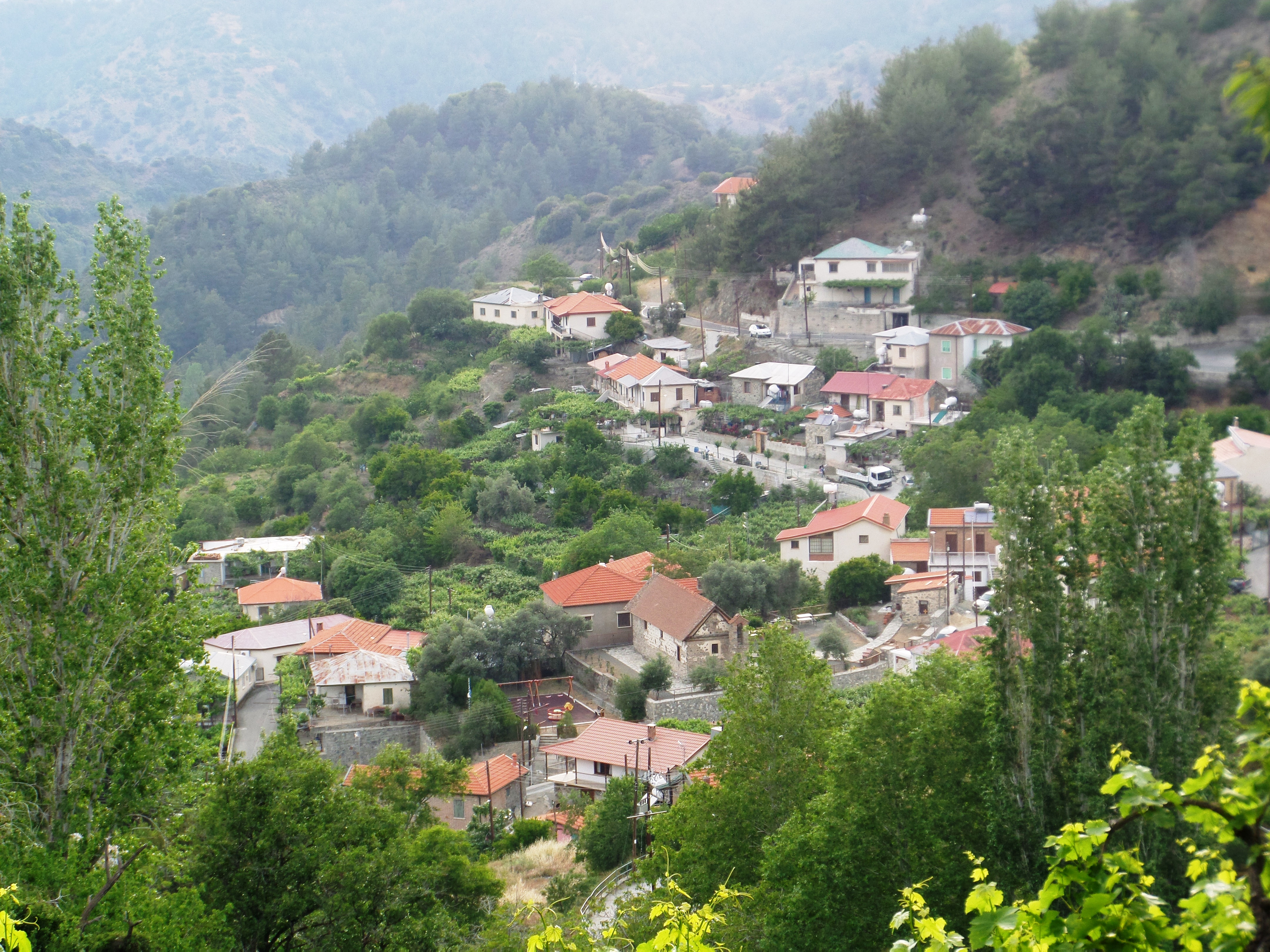

- Location in Cyprus
- Coordinates: 34°55′32″N 32°48′33″E
- Country: Cyprus
- District: Limassol District

Population (2001)
  - Total: 56
- Time zone: UTC+2 (EET)
  - Summer (DST): UTC+3 (EEST)

Agios Dimitrios (Greek: Άγιος Δημήτριος) is a village in the Limassol District of Cyprus, located 6 km south of Prodromos.
