= Saint Demetrios Astoria School =

Private high school in Astoria, Queens, New York, United States

Coordinates: 40°45′57″N 73°55′23″W

Saint Demetrios Greek-American School
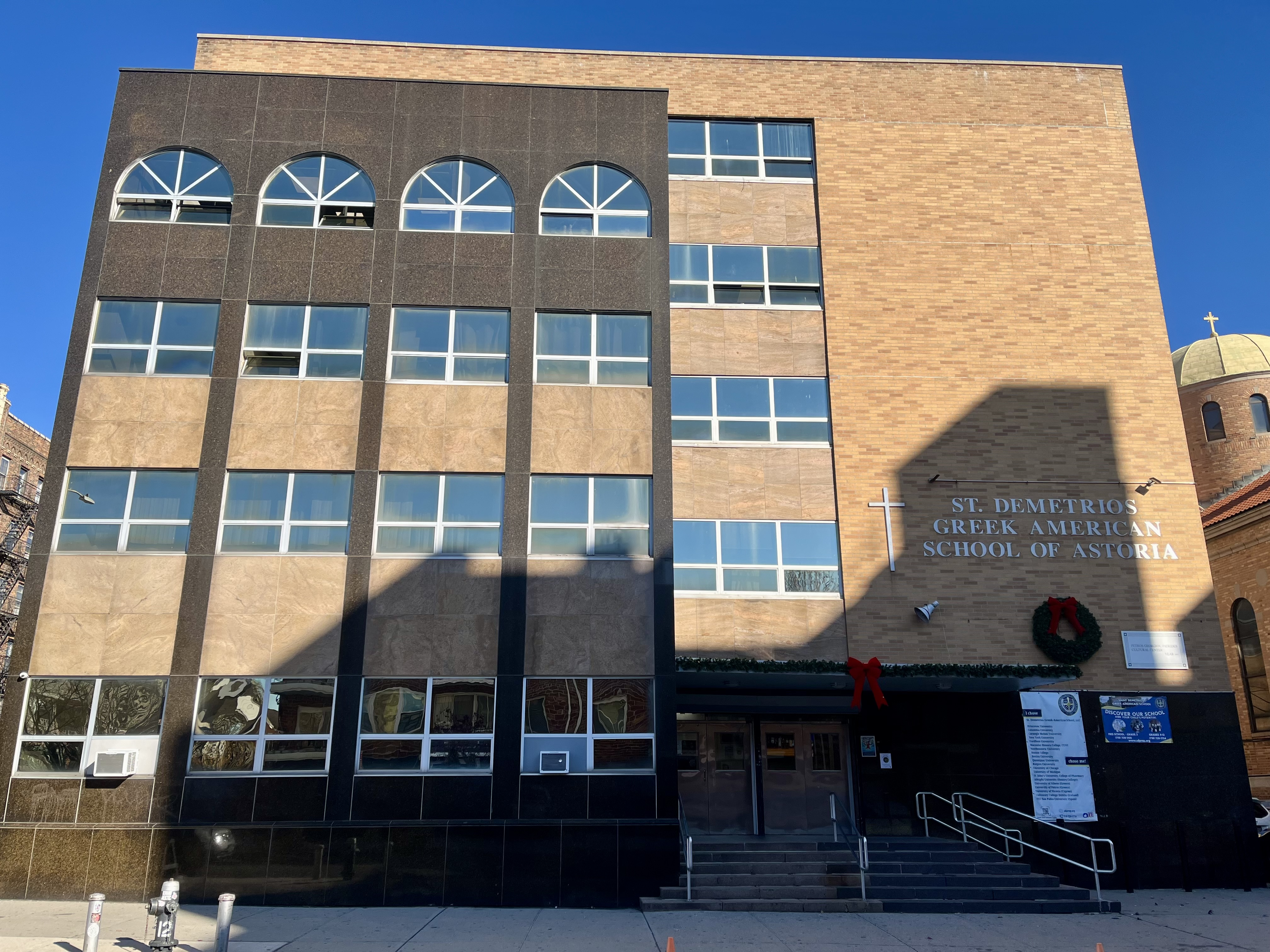

Location
- 30-03 30th Street; Astoria, Queens, New York 11102; United States

Information
- Type: Private PS-12 school
- Motto: Aien Aristeuein ("Ever to Excel")
- Religious affiliation: Greek Orthodox
- Established: 1956
- Grades: PS-12
- Enrollment: 700
- Student to teacher ratio: 18:1
- Mascot: Knight
- Website: www.sdprep.org

Saint Demetrios Greek-American School is a private Greek Orthodox Christian school located in Astoria, Queens, New York City. It is the largest Greek-American and Greek Orthodox day school in the United States, as well as the only Greek Orthodox high school in the United States. It enrolls students from preschool to twelfth grade.

The school is associated with the Saint Demetrios Cathedral.

== History ==
The school was founded in 1956.

The elementary school building was purchased in 1974, after a wave of immigration by Greek Cypriots to Astoria created a need for additional classrooms. A $1 million donation in 2017 allowed the school to modernize the elementary school facilities.

Greek and Greek-American dignitaries have visited the school, including Antonis Samaras in 2013, Alexis Tsipras in 2016, and Archbishop Elpidophoros of America in 2019.
