= Karpero =

Karpero Καρπερό
- Community
- Location within Greece
- Coordinates: 39°56.8′N 21°37.2′E
- Country: Greece
- Administrative region: Western Macedonia
- Regional unit: Grevena
- Municipality: Deskati
- Municipal unit: Chasia

Area
  - Community: 78.072 km^{2} (30.144 sq mi)
- Elevation: 468 m (1,535 ft)

Population (2021)
  - Community: 763
  - Density: 9.77/km^{2} (25.3/sq mi)
- Time zone: UTC+2 (EET)
  - Summer (DST): UTC+3 (EEST)
- Postal code: 511 00
- Area code: +30-2462
- Vehicle registration: PN

Karpero (Greek: Καρπερό, before 1927: Δημηνίτσα – Diminitsa) is a village and a community of the Deskati municipality. Before the 2011 local government reform it was part of the municipality of Chasia, of which it was a municipal district. The 2021 census recorded 763 inhabitants in the community. The community of Karpero covers an area of 78.072 km^{2}.

The 1920 Greek census recorded 274 people in the village. Following the Greek–Turkish population exchange, Greek refugee families in Karpero were from Pontus (69) in 1926. The 1928 Greek census recorded 463 village inhabitants. In 1928, the refugee families numbered 68 (231 people).

== Administrative division ==
The community of Karpero consists of two separate settlements:

- Dimitra (population 306 as of 2021)
- Karpero (population 457)

Former villages:

- Elafi

== See also ==
- List of settlements in the Grevena regional unit
