= Hagios Demetrios =

Main sanctuary dedicated to Saint Demetrius

Church of St. Demetrios
UNESCO World Heritage Site
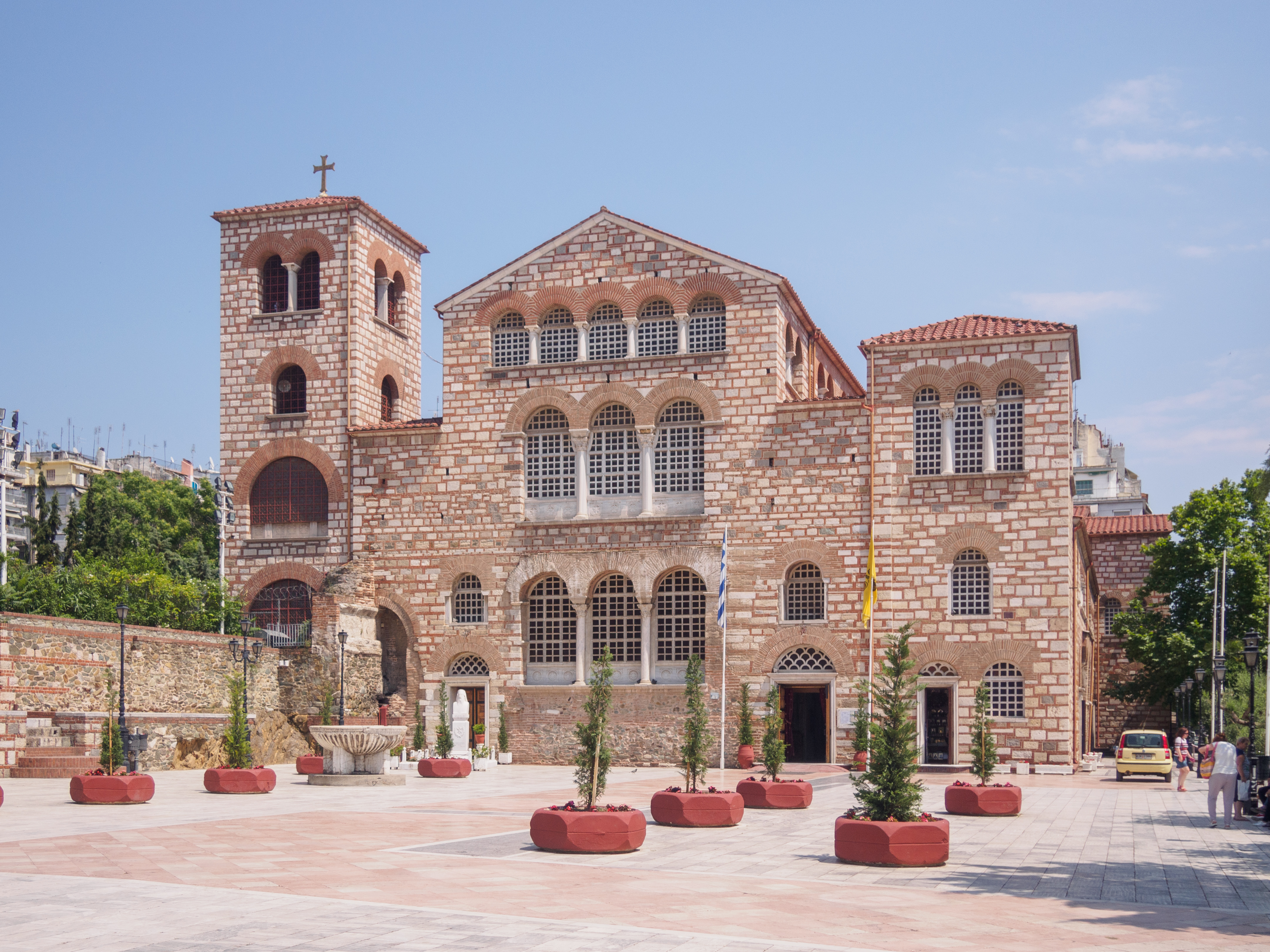
- Façade of the Basilica of Hagios Demetrios

- Location within Greece
- Location: Thessaloniki, Macedonia, Greece
- Part of: Paleochristian and Byzantine monuments of Thessaloniki
- Criteria: Cultural: (i), (ii), (iv)
- Reference: 456-004
- Inscription: 1988 (12th Session)
- Area: 1.16 ha (2.9 acres)
- Coordinates: 40°38′20″N 22°56′52″E

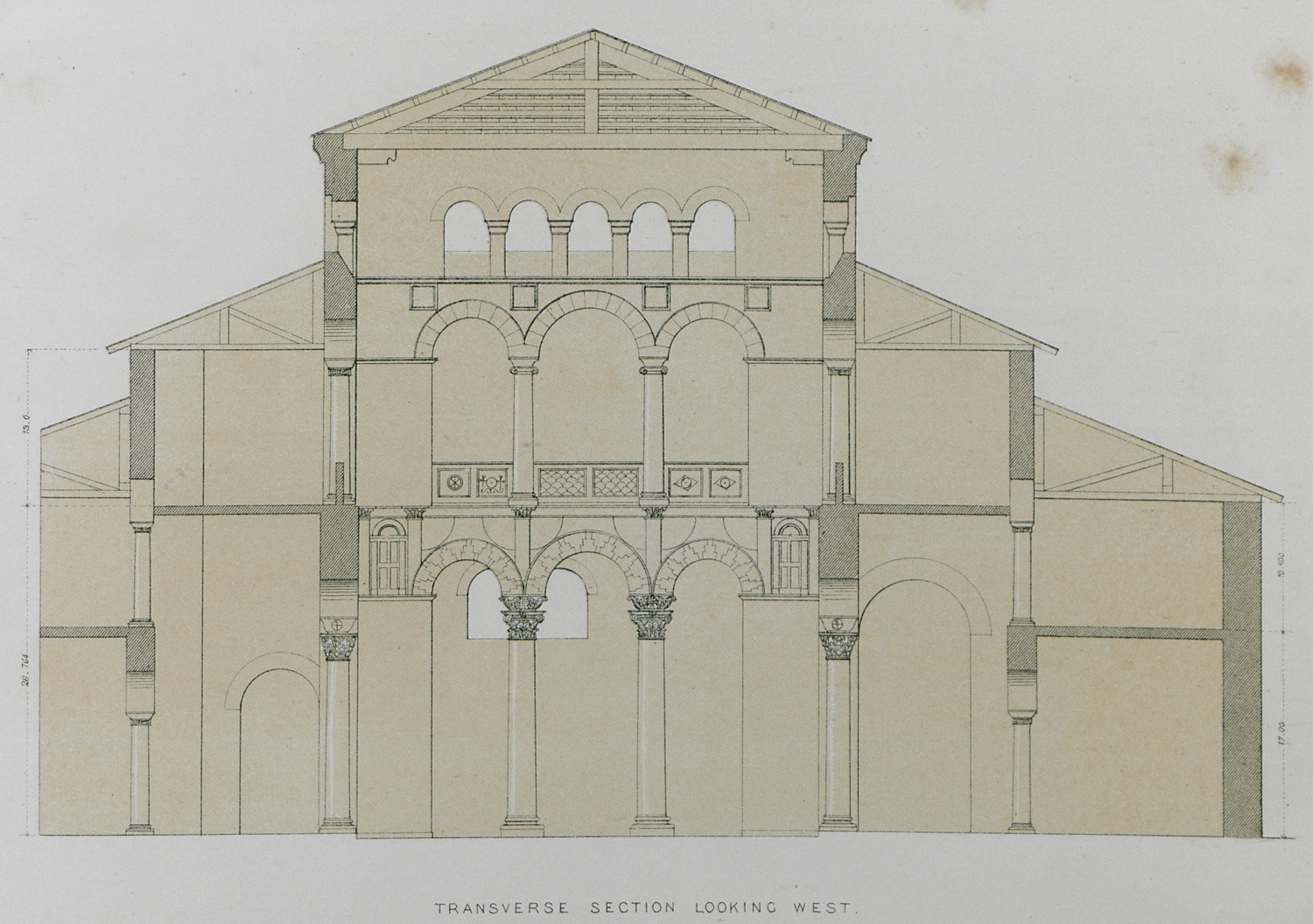
Byzantine architecture by Félix Marie Charles Texier. Illustrated by "Examples of Edifices erected in the East during the earliest Ages of Christianity", R.Popplewell Pullan, London, Day & Son, 1864.

The Church of Saint Demetrius, or Hagios Demetrios (Greek: Άγιος Δημήτριος), is the main sanctuary dedicated to Saint Demetrius, the patron saint of Thessaloniki (in Central Macedonia, Greece), dating from a time when it was the second largest city of the Byzantine Empire. Since 1988, it has been on the UNESCO World Heritage List as a part of the site Paleochristian and Byzantine monuments of Thessaloniki.

== History ==
The first church on the spot was constructed in the early 4th century AD, replacing a Roman bath. A century later, a prefect named Leontios replaced the small oratory with a larger, three-aisled basilica. Repeatedly gutted by fires, the church eventually was reconstructed as a five-aisled basilica in 629–634. This was the surviving form of the church much as it is today. The most important shrine in the city, it was probably larger than the local cathedral. The historic location of the latter is now unknown.

The church had an unusual shrine called the ciborium, a hexagonal, roofed structure at one side of the nave. It was made of or covered with silver. The structure had doors and inside was a couch or bed. Unusually, it did not hold any physical relics of the saint. The ciborium seems to have been a symbolic tomb. It was rebuilt at least once.

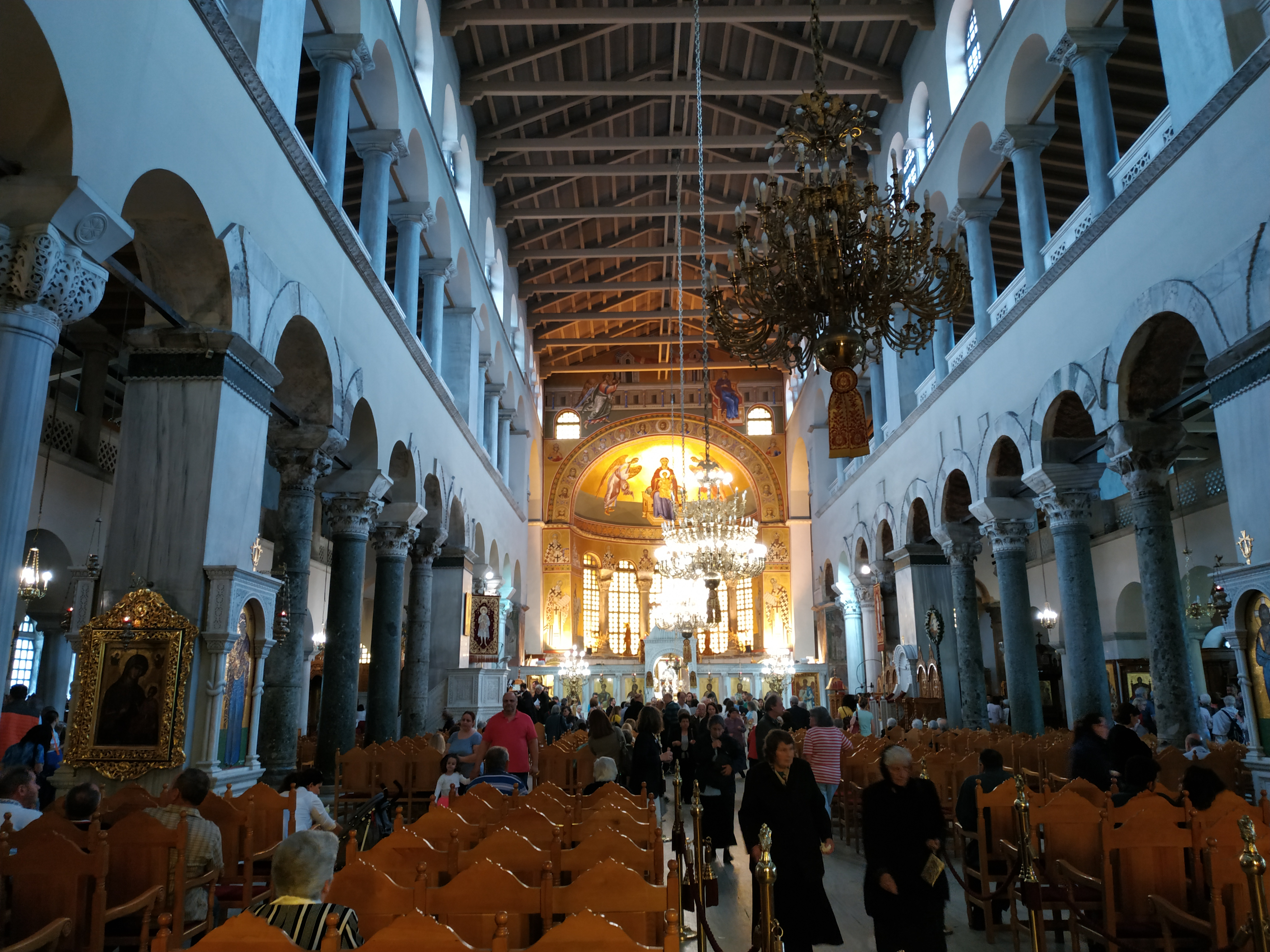
Interior with rests of applicated light and dark fields of the arches

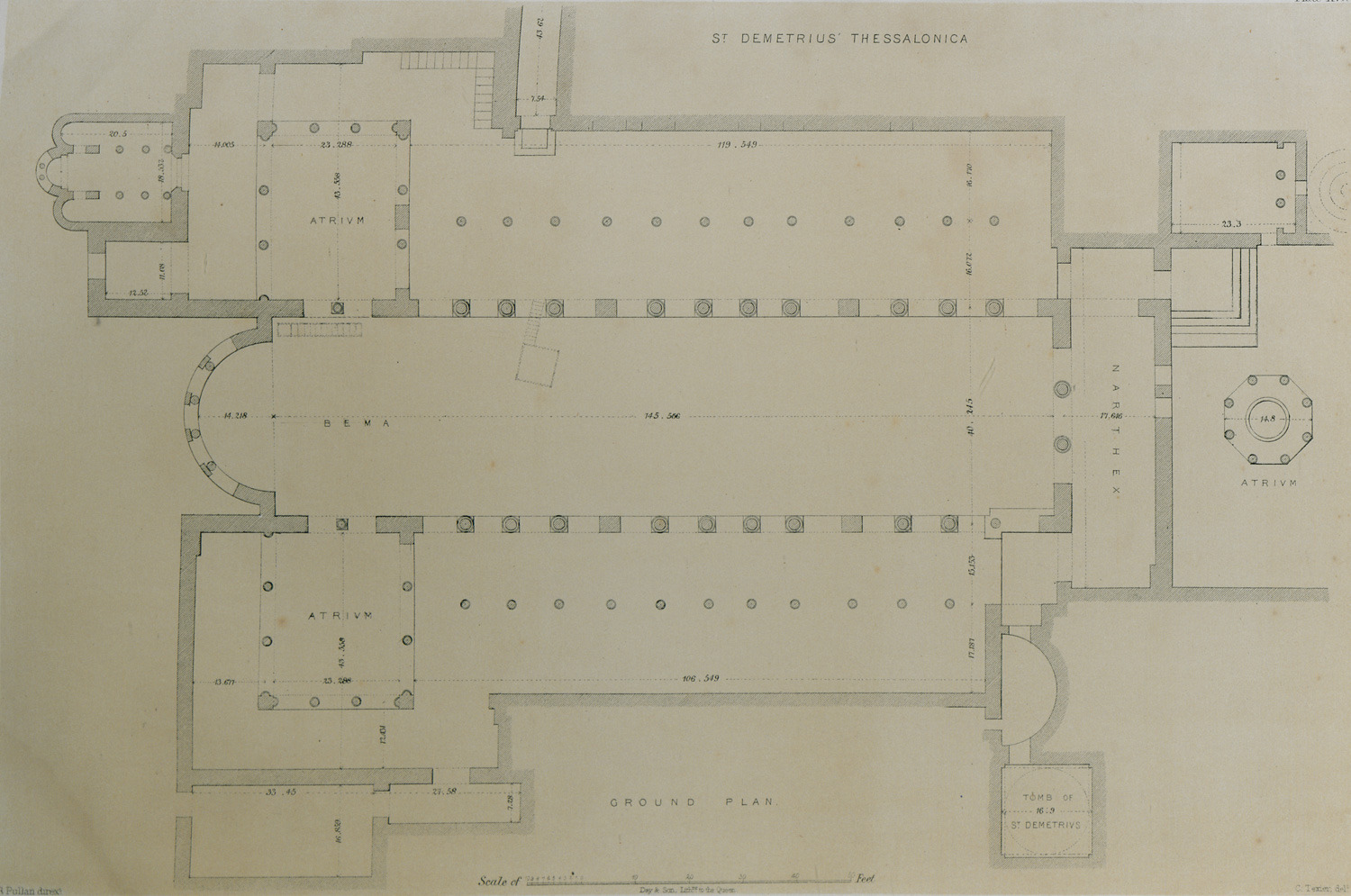
St Demetrius, Thessalonica ground plan, Texier Charles,1864

The basilica is famous for six extant mosaic panels, dated to the period between the latest reconstruction and the inauguration of the Byzantine Iconoclasm in 730. These mosaics depict St. Demetrius with officials responsible for the restoration of the church (called the founders, ktetors) and with children. An inscription below one of the images glorifies heaven for saving the people of Thessalonica from a pagan Slavic raid in 615.

Under the Latin Empire in 1206, the legate Benedict of Porto gave Hagios Demetrios to the canons of the Holy Sepulchre.

Thessaloniki became part of the Ottoman Empire in 1430. About 60 years later, during the reign of Bayezid II, the church was converted into a mosque, known as the Kasımiye Camii after the local Ottoman mayor, Cezeri Kasım Pasha. The symbolic tomb however was kept open for Christian veneration. Other magnificent mosaics, recorded as covering the church interior, were lost either during the four centuries when it functioned as a mosque (1493–1912) or in the Great Thessaloniki Fire of 1917 that destroyed much of the city. It also destroyed the roof and upper walls of the church. Black-and-white photographs and good watercolour versions give an idea of the early Byzantine craftsmanship lost during the fire.

Following the Great Fire of 1917, it took decades to restore the church. Tombstones from the city's Jewish cemetery - destroyed by the Greek and Nazi German authorities - were used as building materials in these restoration efforts in the 1940s. Archeological excavations conducted in the 1930s and 1940s revealed interesting artifacts that may be seen in a museum situated inside the church's crypt. The excavations also uncovered the ruins of a Roman bath, where St. Demetrius was said to have been held prisoner and executed. A Roman well was also discovered. Scholars believe this is where soldiers dropped the body of St. Demetrius after his execution. After restoration, the church was reconsecrated in 1949.

== Gallery ==
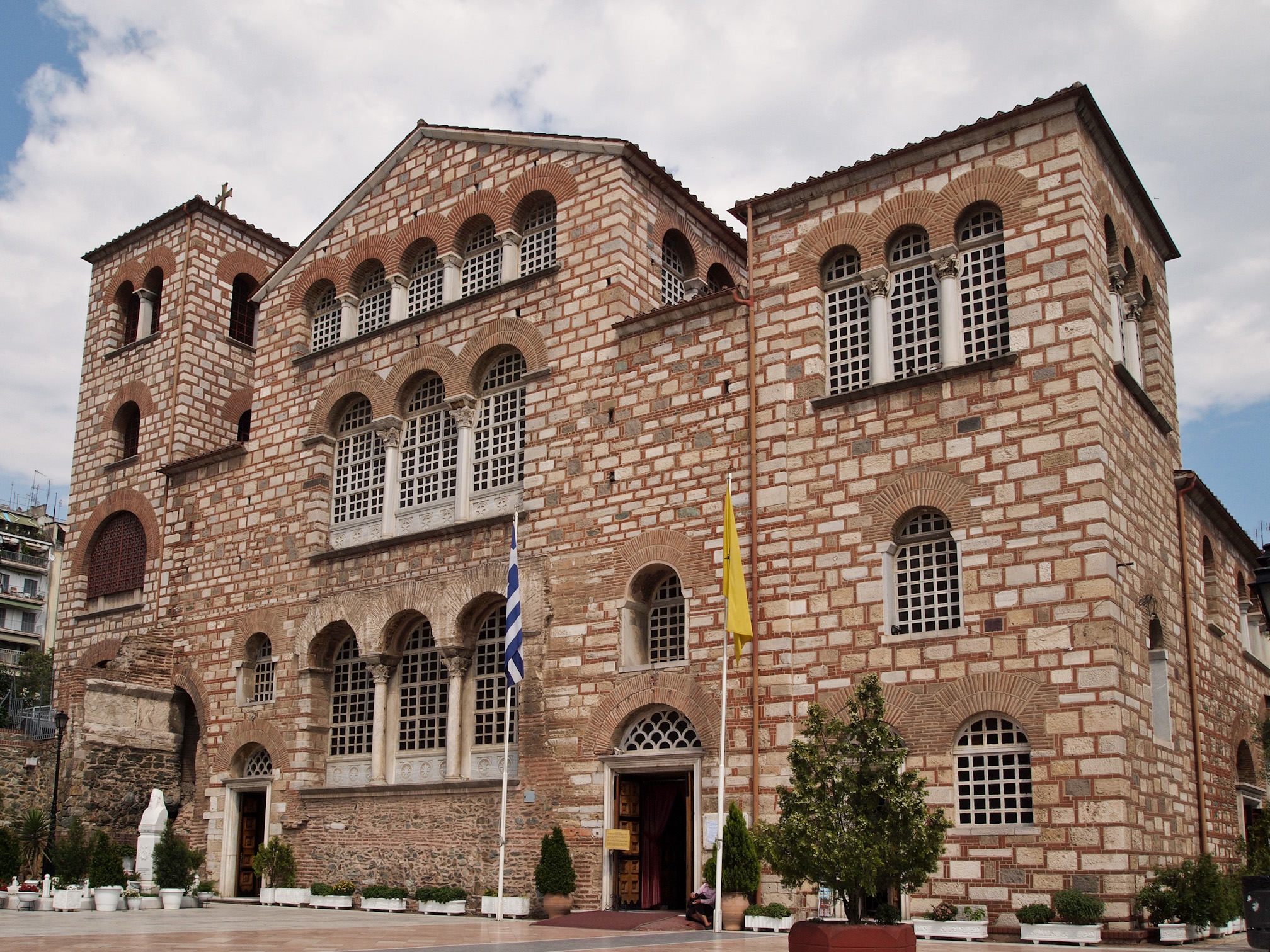
Facade

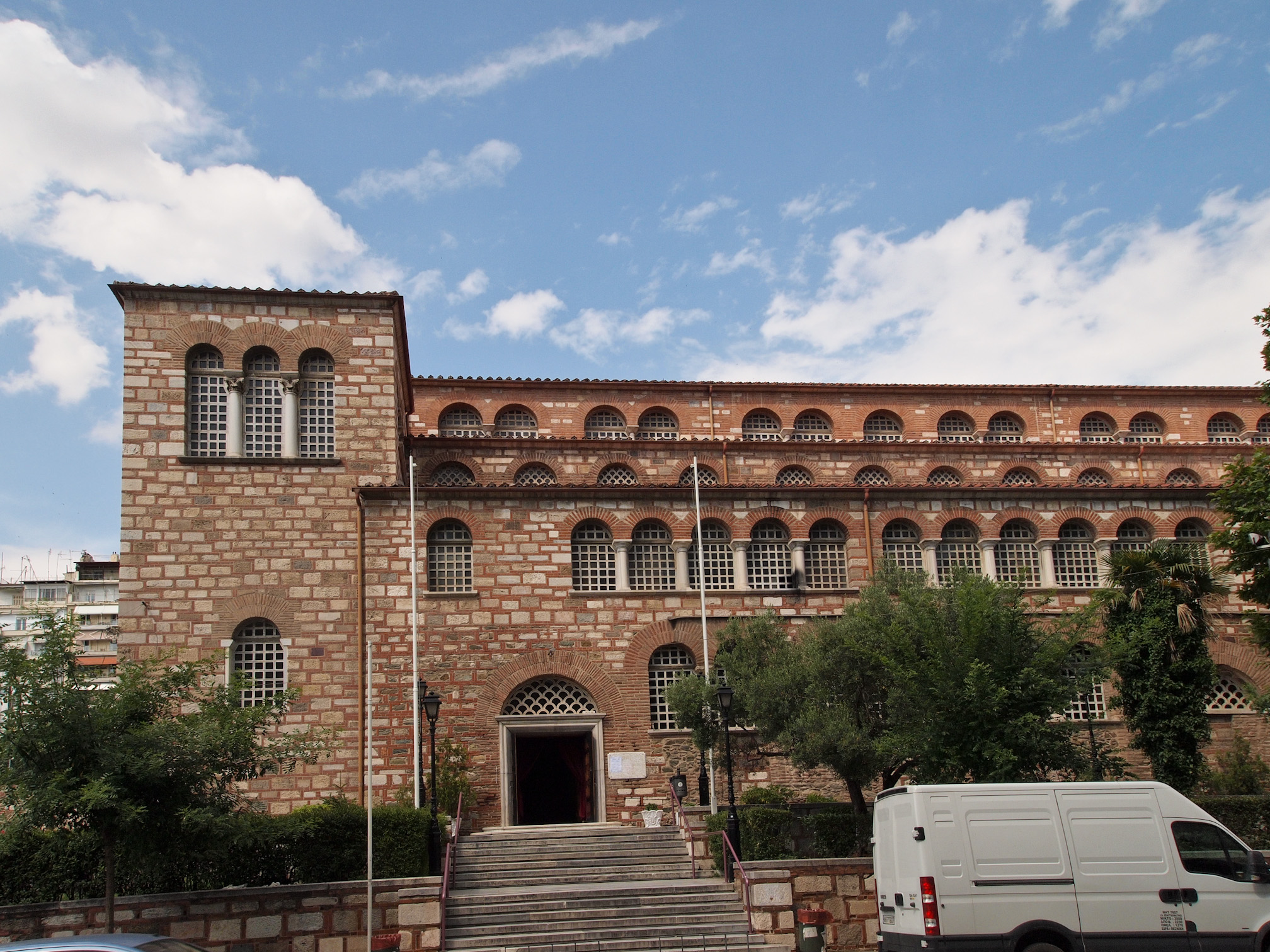
Side view

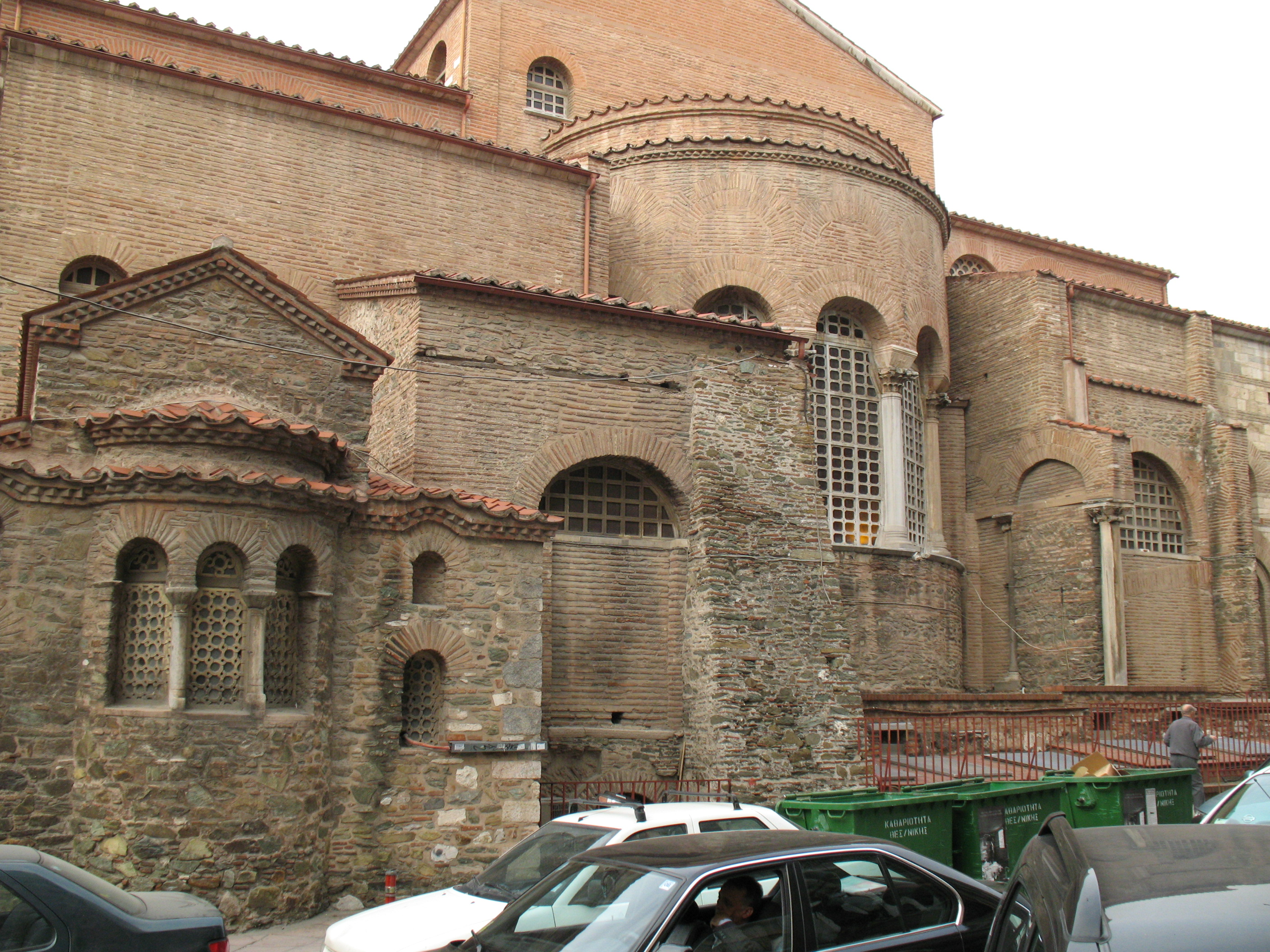
Close view of the rear, with tripartite apse

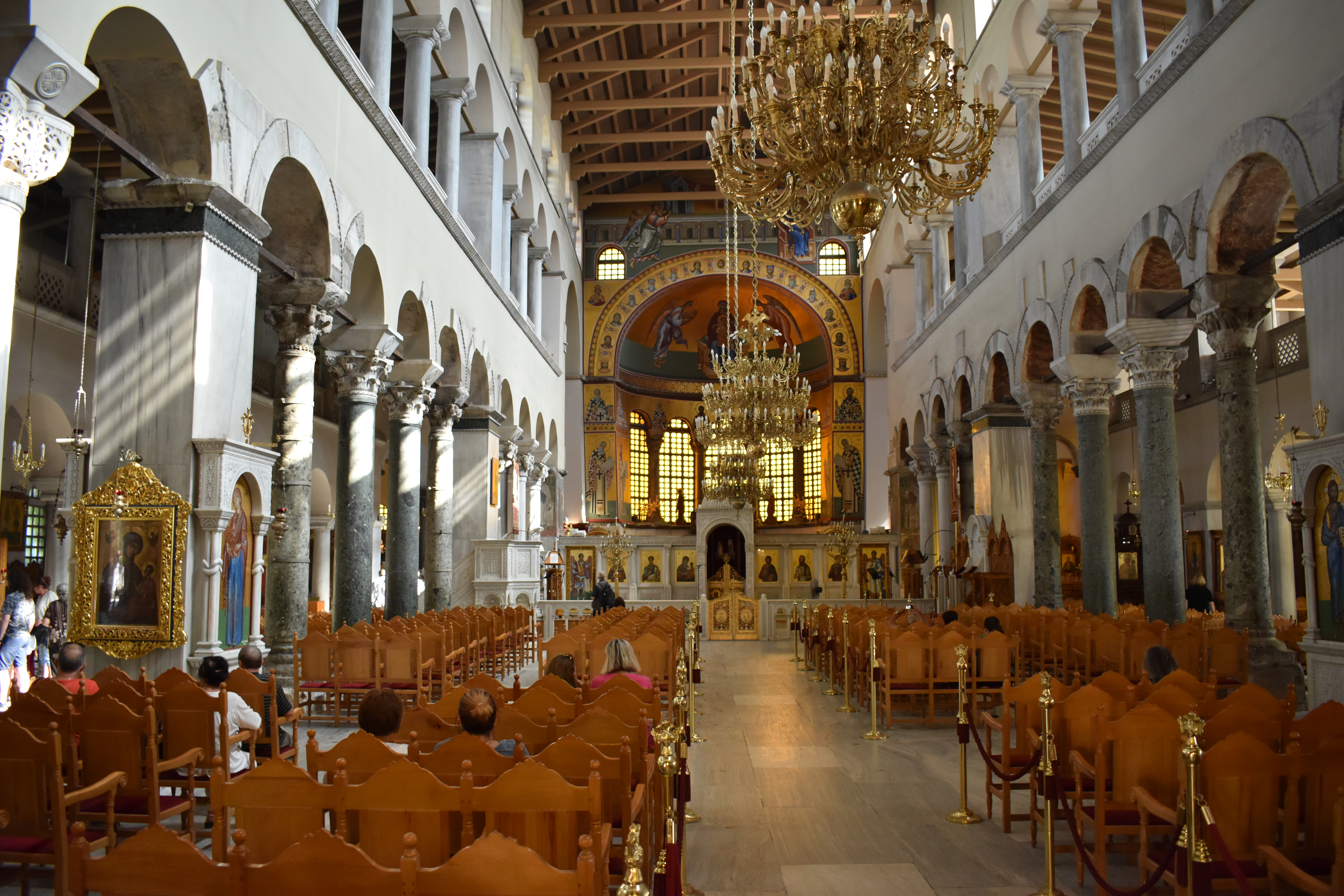
Interior

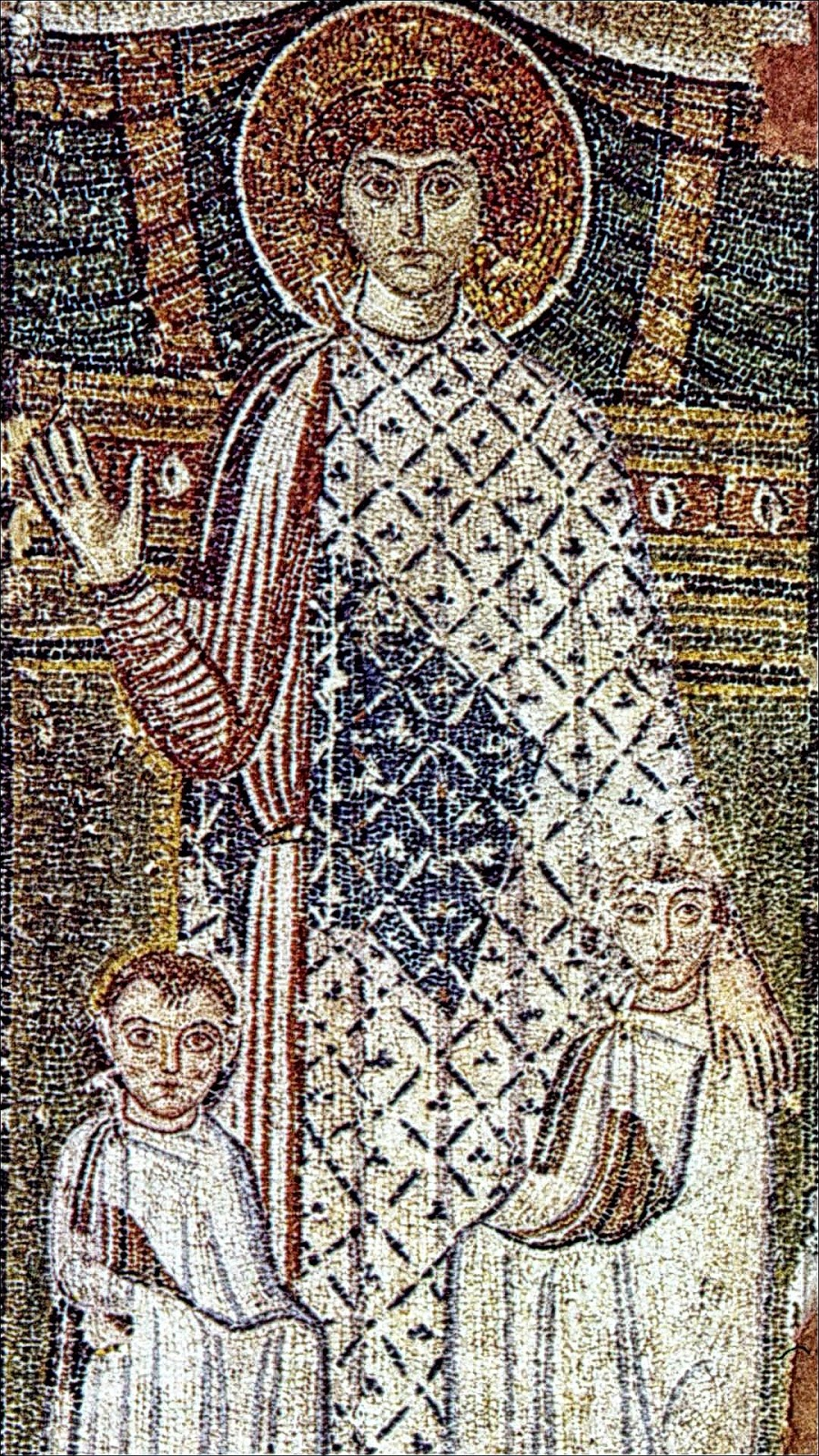
St George (previously identified as St Demetrius) with children: one of the few mosaics that escaped destruction from the iconoclasts

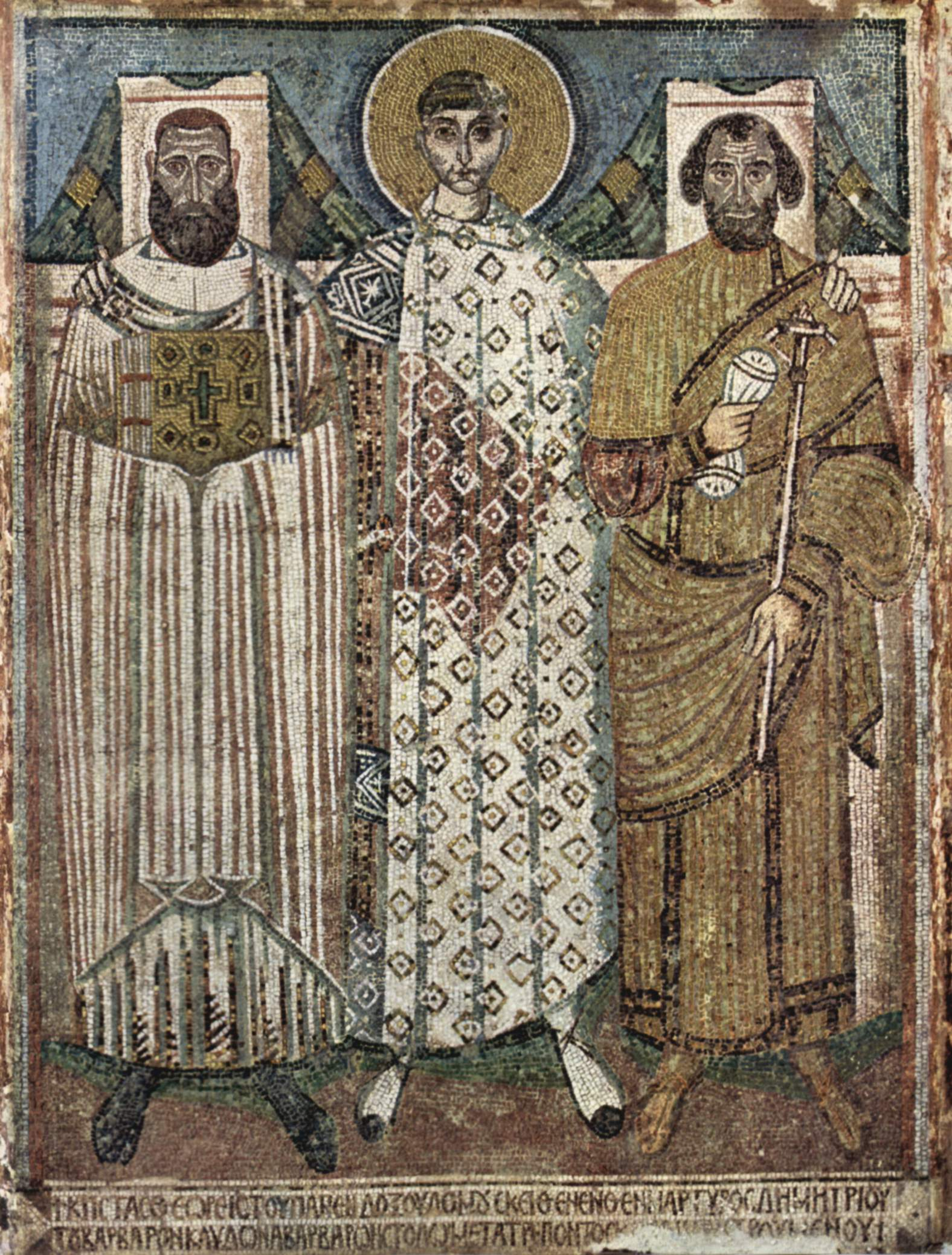
Mosaic of St Demetrius between the eparch and the bishop (7th)

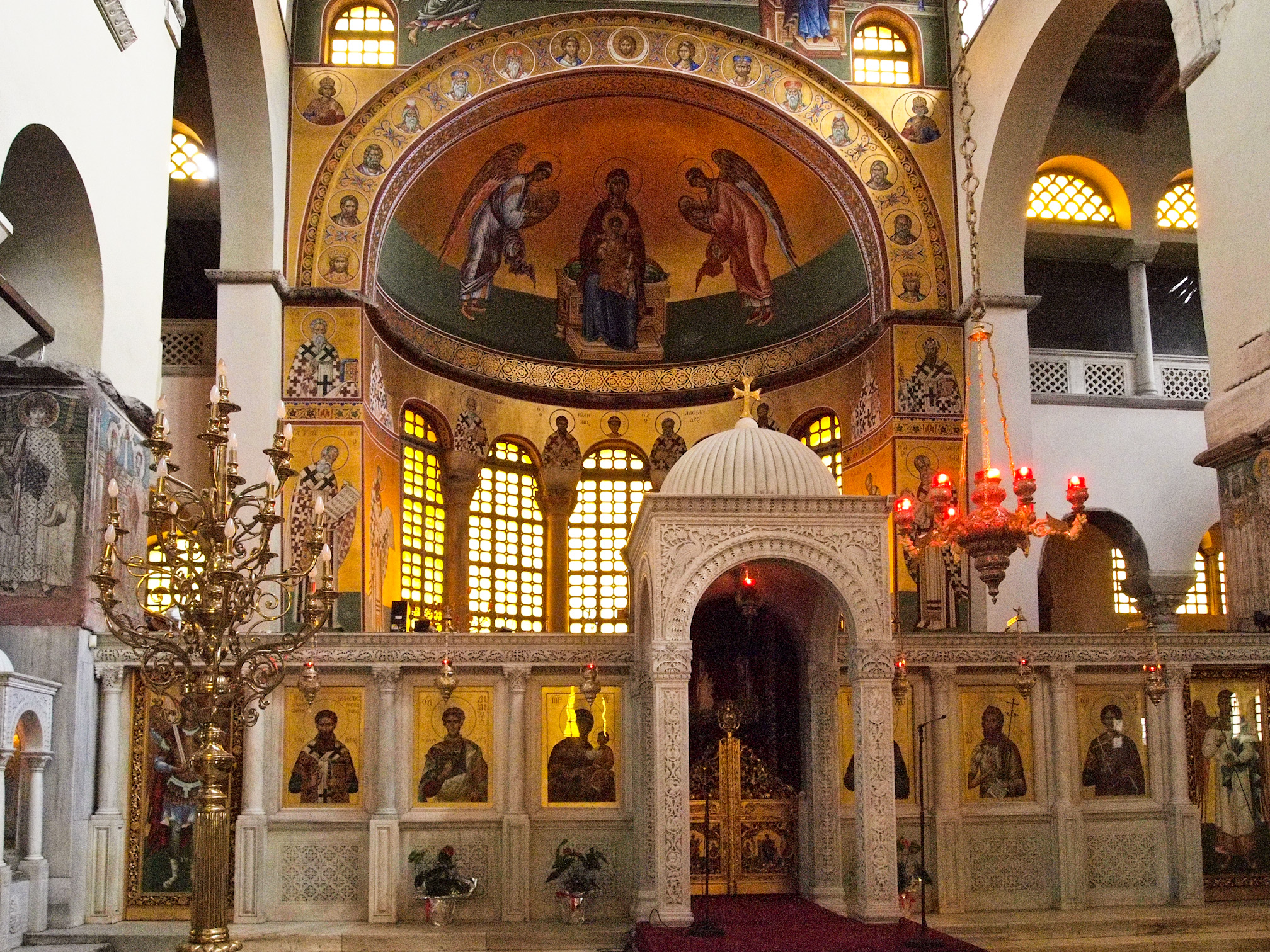
Iconostasis

Icon of Saint Nestor

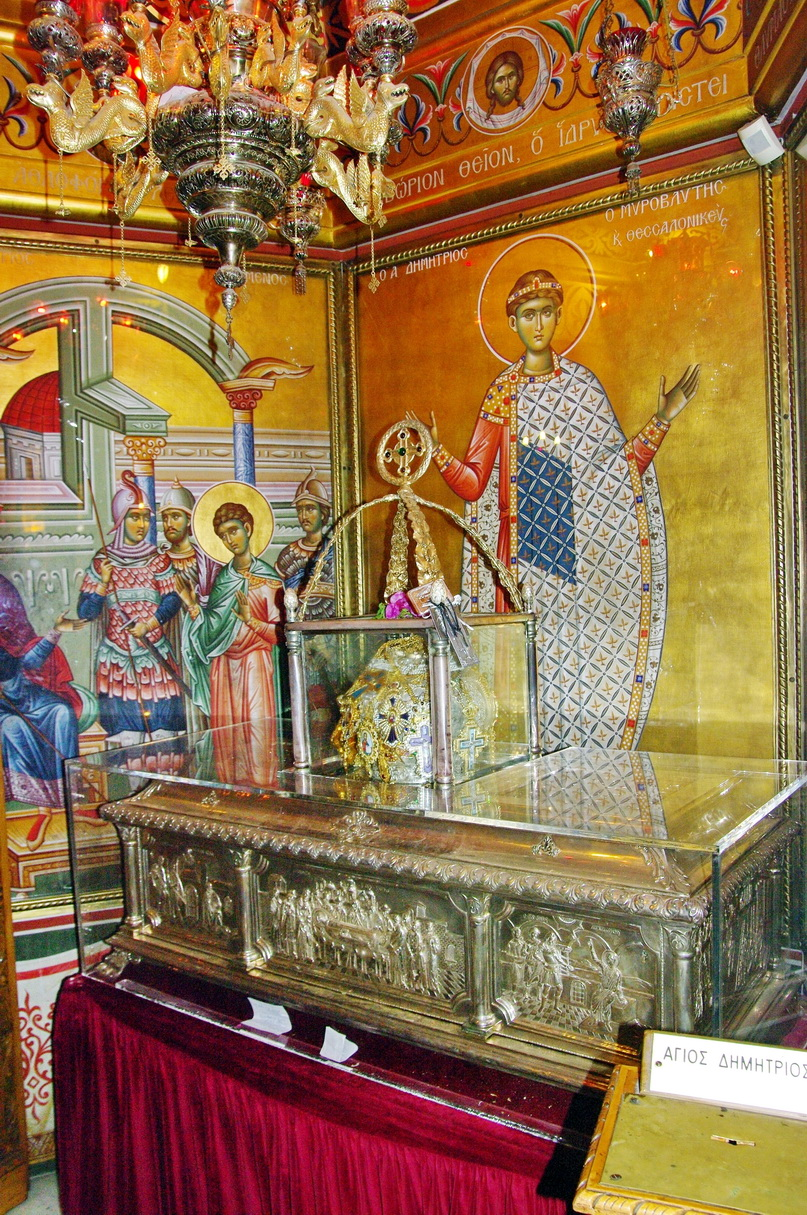
Relics of St Demetrius

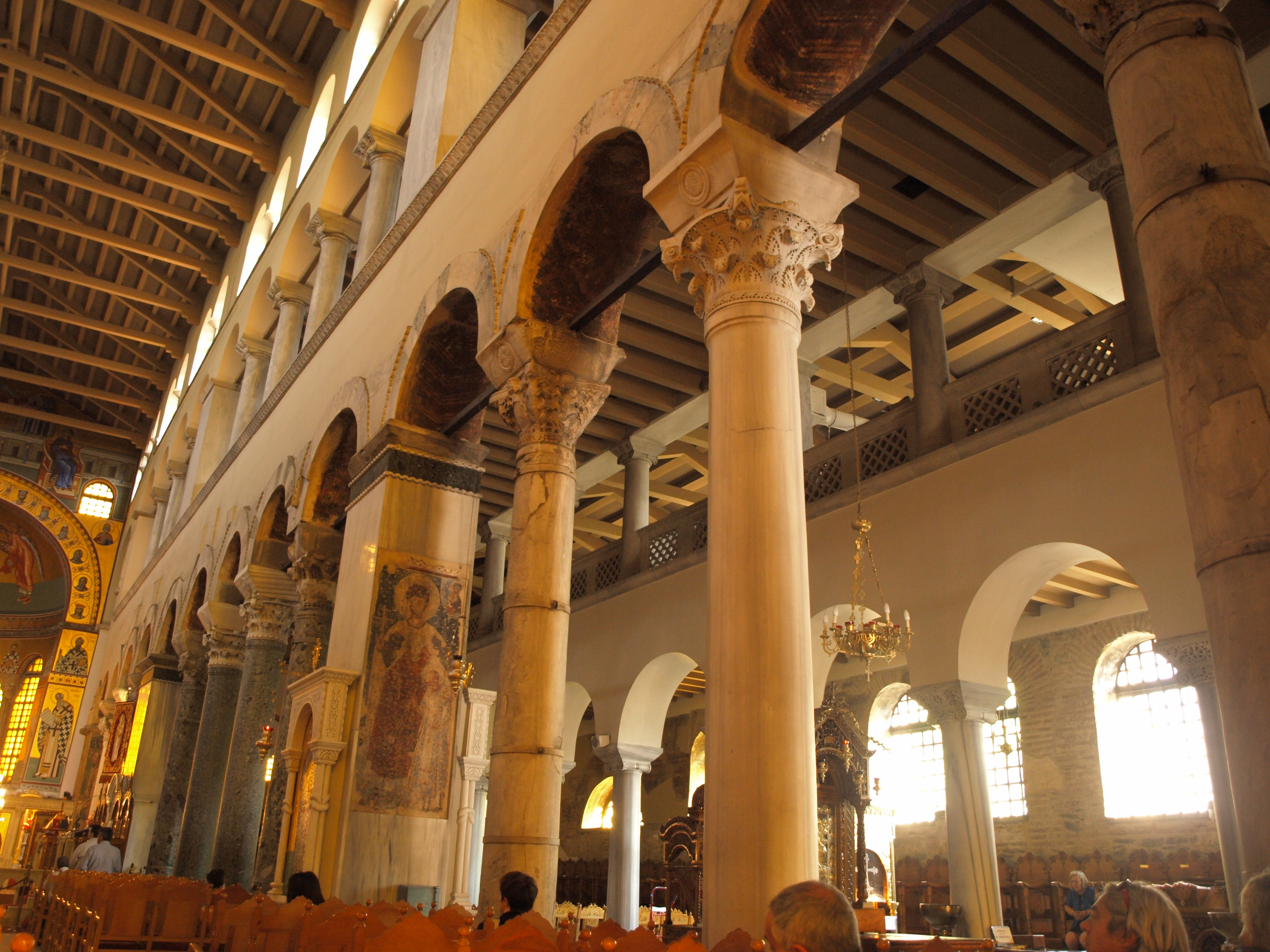
Capitals in nave

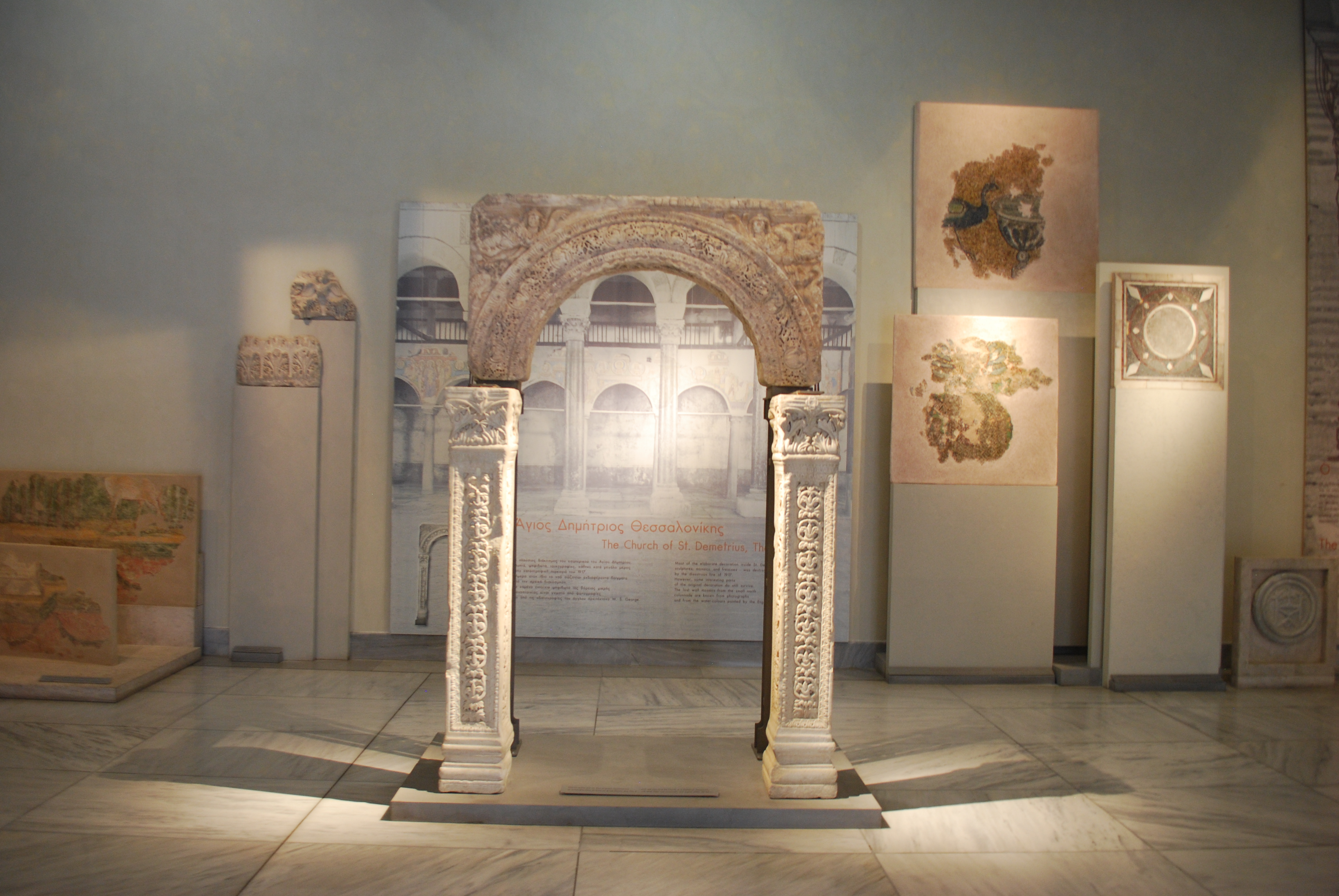
Arch and piers from the Church of St. Demetrius, with relief Nikes and zoomorphic and vegetal motifs, at the Museum of Byzantine Culture (5th-6th)

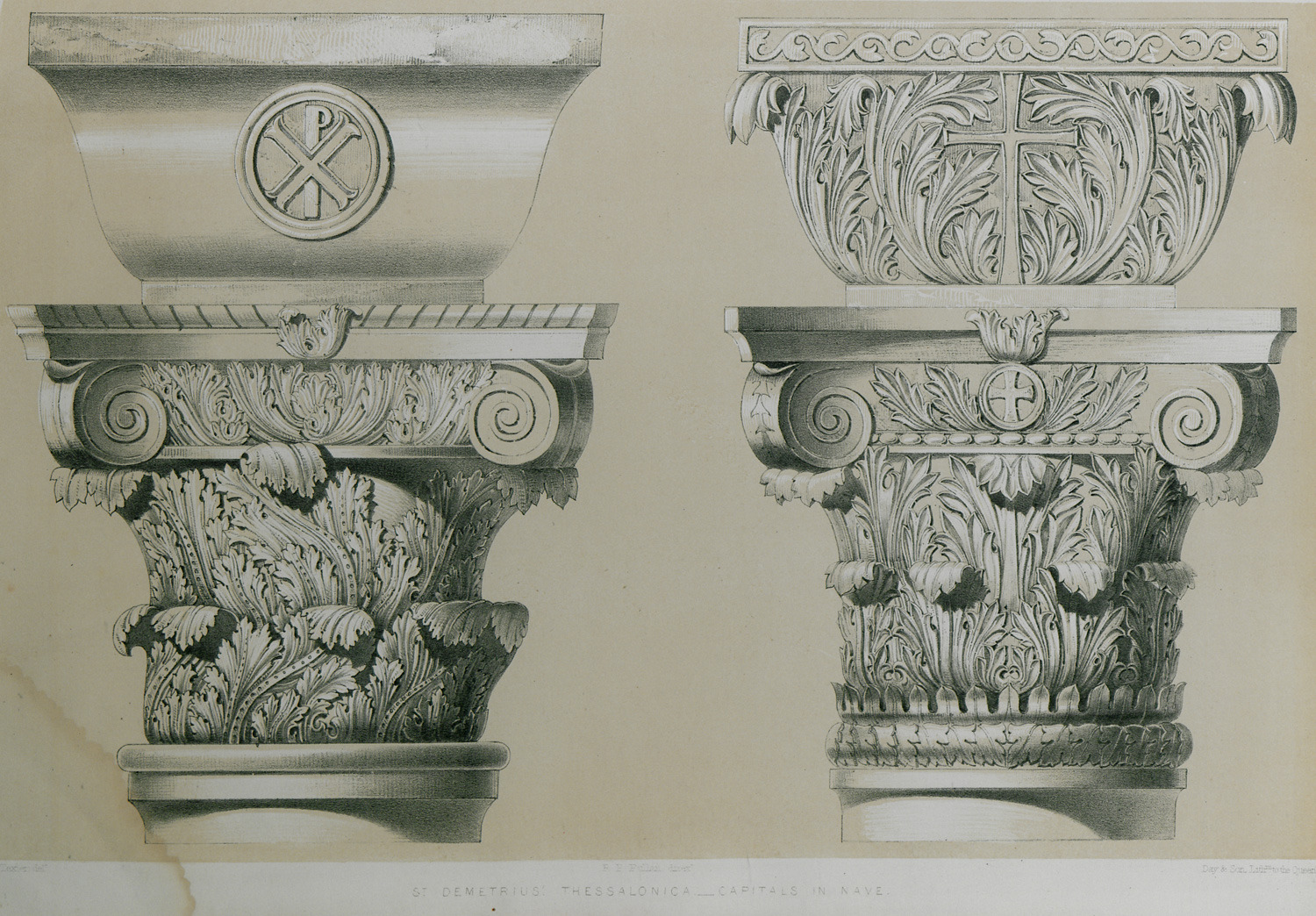
capitals in nave

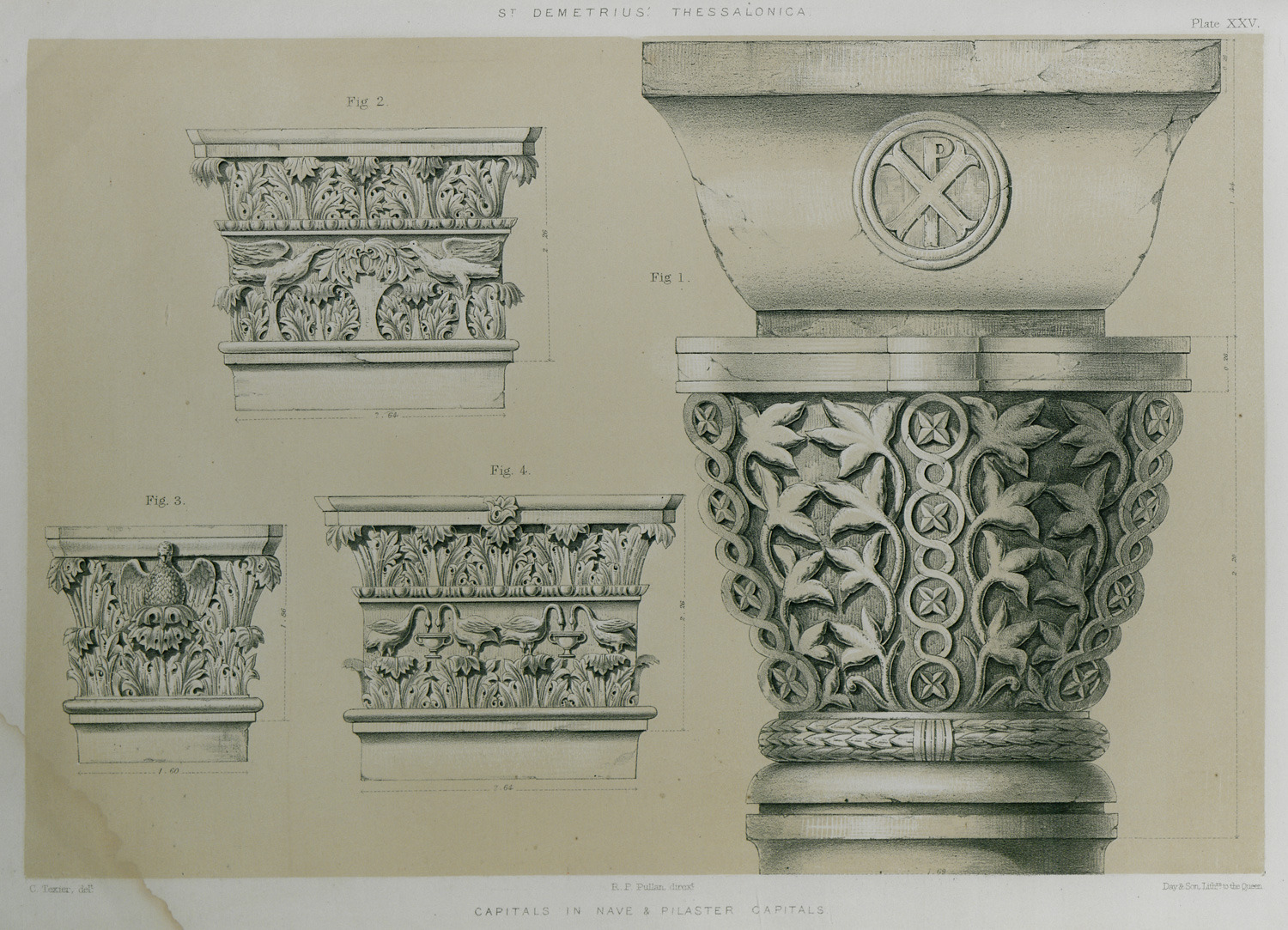
capitals in nave and pilaster capitals

== The crypt (catacombs) ==
Underneath the Church of St Demetrios is the place where St Demetrios, Thessaloniki's patron saint, along with other Christians of the early Roman period, were martyred.

As the level of the ground gradually rose over the centuries, this area acquired the form of a crypt. According both to tradition and to archaeological findings, it was an old bathhouse, in which Demetrios was imprisoned and eventually martyred in 303 AD. In the 5th century, when the first Church of St Demetrios was built, the site of his martyrdom was incorporated into the church and the fountain was converted into a source of holy water. In the years that followed, the fountain acquired basins, from which the faithful could collect myron, the sweet-smelling oil produced by the saint's relics. The crypt filled up with earth during the period of Ottoman rule and was not rediscovered until after the fire of 1917. It has been restored by the Archaeological Service and was converted into an exhibition space in 1988.

It displays a collection of sculptures, capitals, closure slabs, and vessels from the Church of St Demetrios. More specifically, in room I there are sculptures from the original 5th-century church and piers with relief decoration and capitals with four acanthus leaves. In room II, in the saint's chapel, there are inscriptions documenting the history of the church, together with figural sculptures of the Middle Byzantine period. Room III displays photographs, plans, and copies of the restoration work done on the church after the fire of 1917.

In the next room, room IV, there are sculptures from the decoration of the church which was built after the fire in the 7th century, and the ambo from the original 5th-century church is in room V. Rooms VI and VII, lastly, display sculptures from the decoration of the church in the Middle Byzantine period (10th century) and sculptures and pottery of the 13th–15th centuries. More specifically, these include the remains of the original ciborium, which was constructed to house first the saint's icon and later his sarcophagus. The ciborium was hexagonal and made of wood and silver. There are also an arch and fragments of arches from a Byzantine ciborium over the altar, which latter is ornamented with crosses in medallions and crosses resting on orbs. An inscription indicates that the donor of the ciborium was Theodore, Bishop of Thessaloniki in the 13th century.

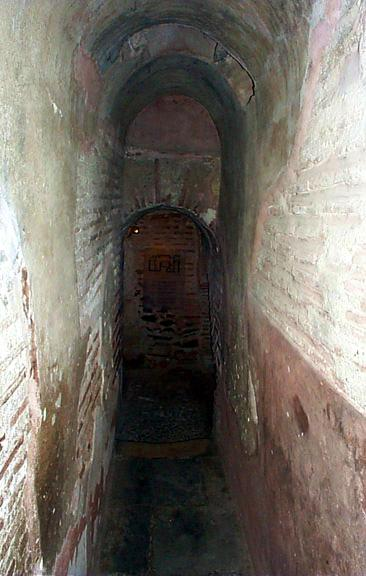
Entrance to the crypt

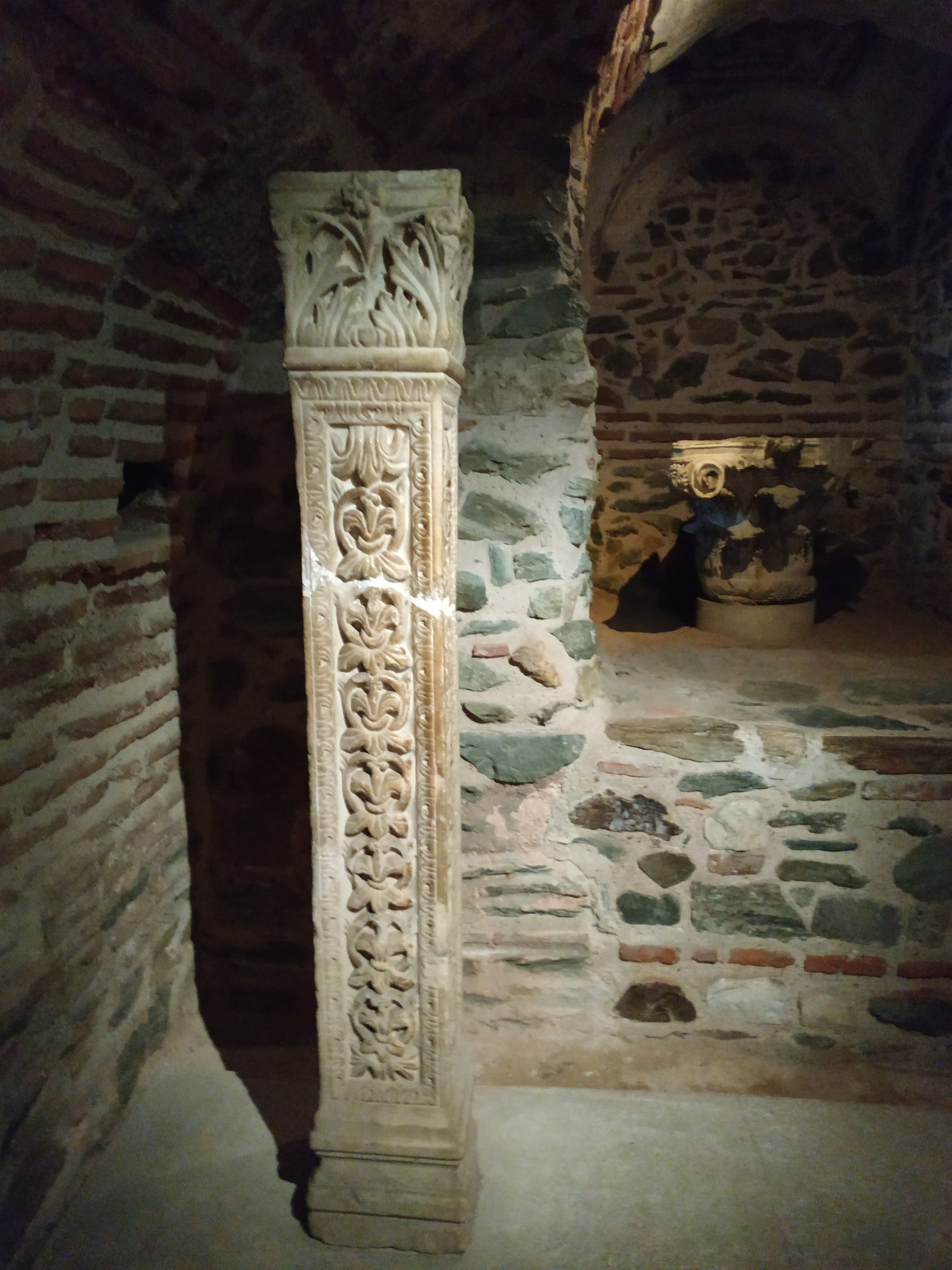
Interior

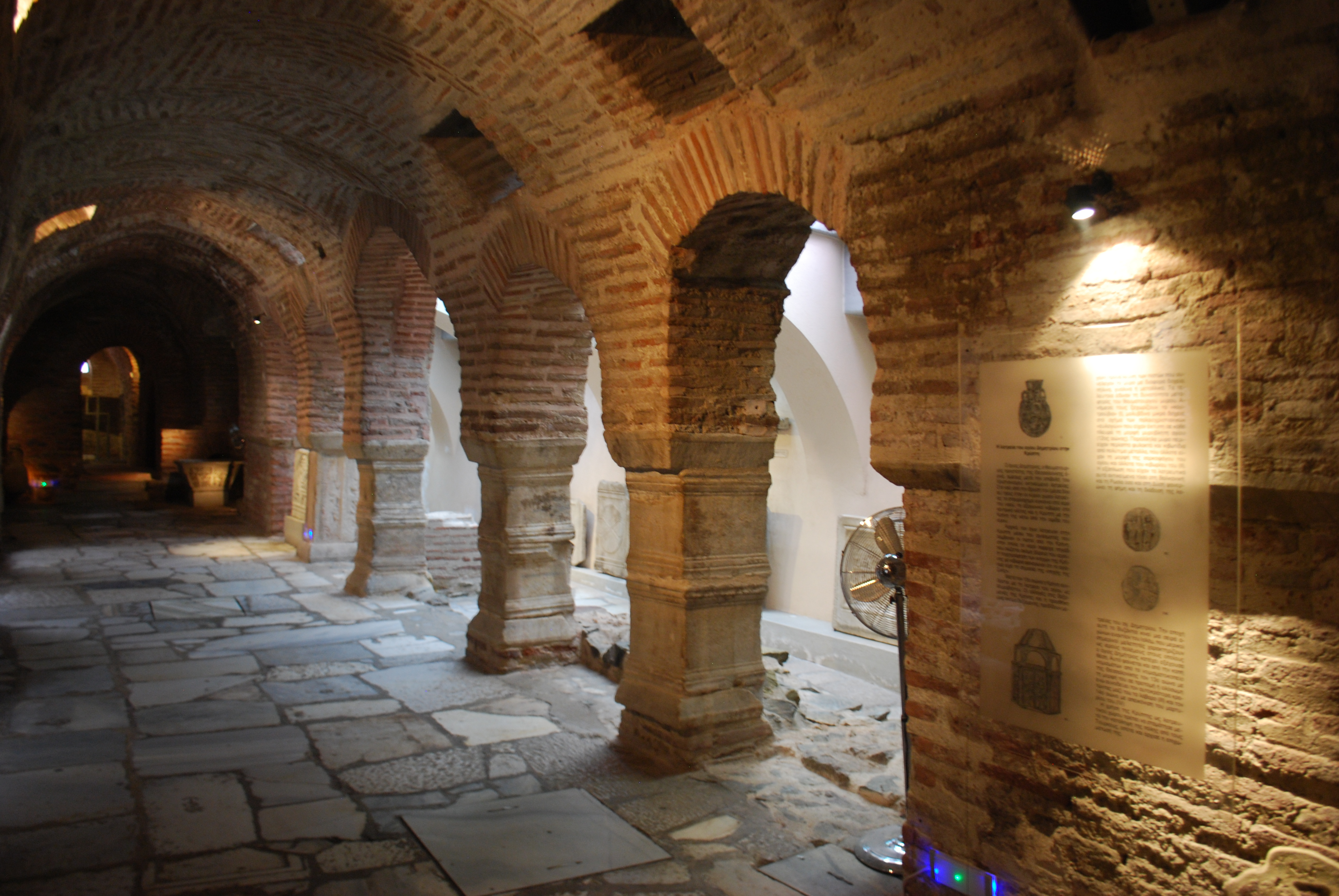
Interior

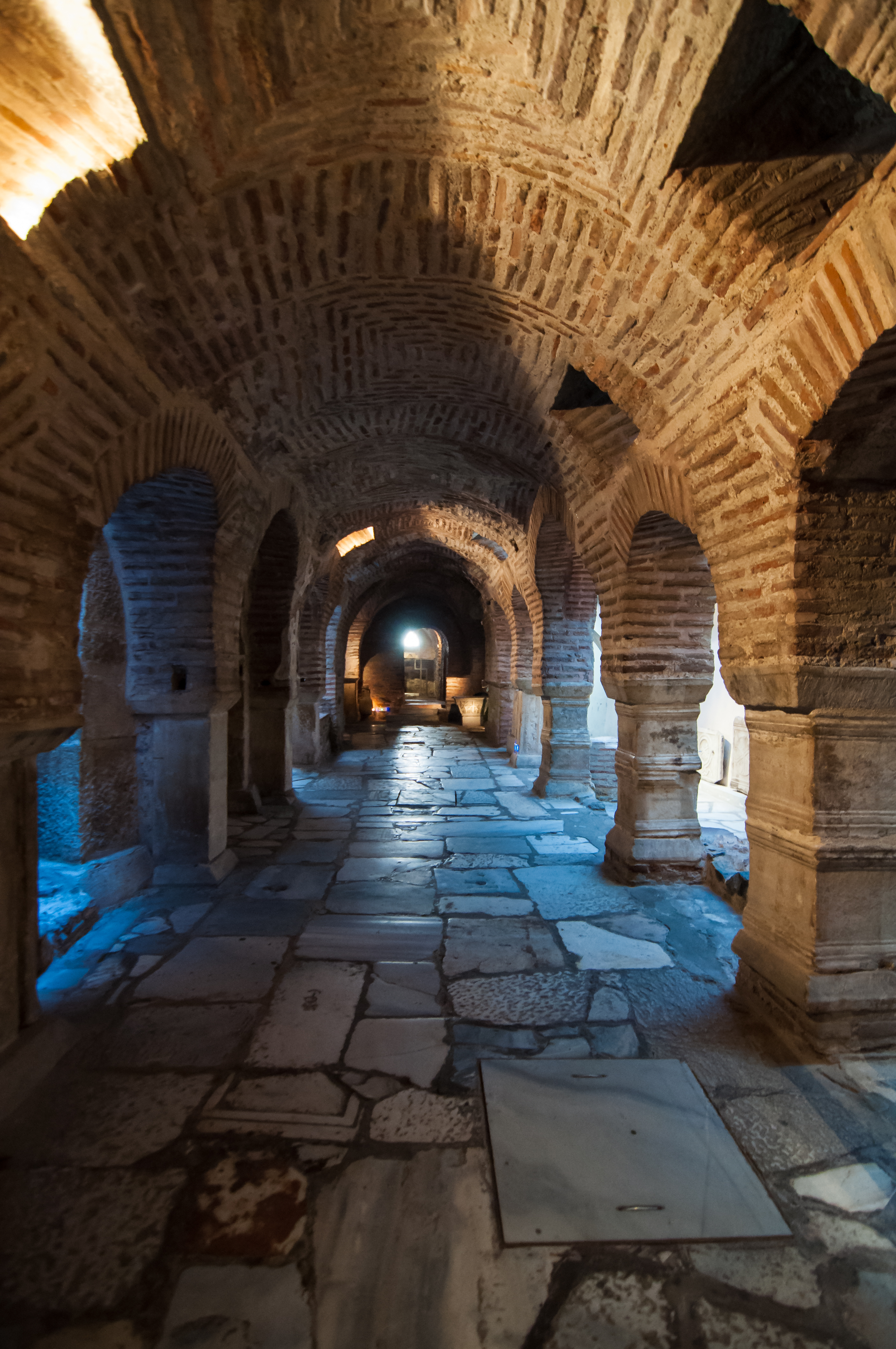
Interior

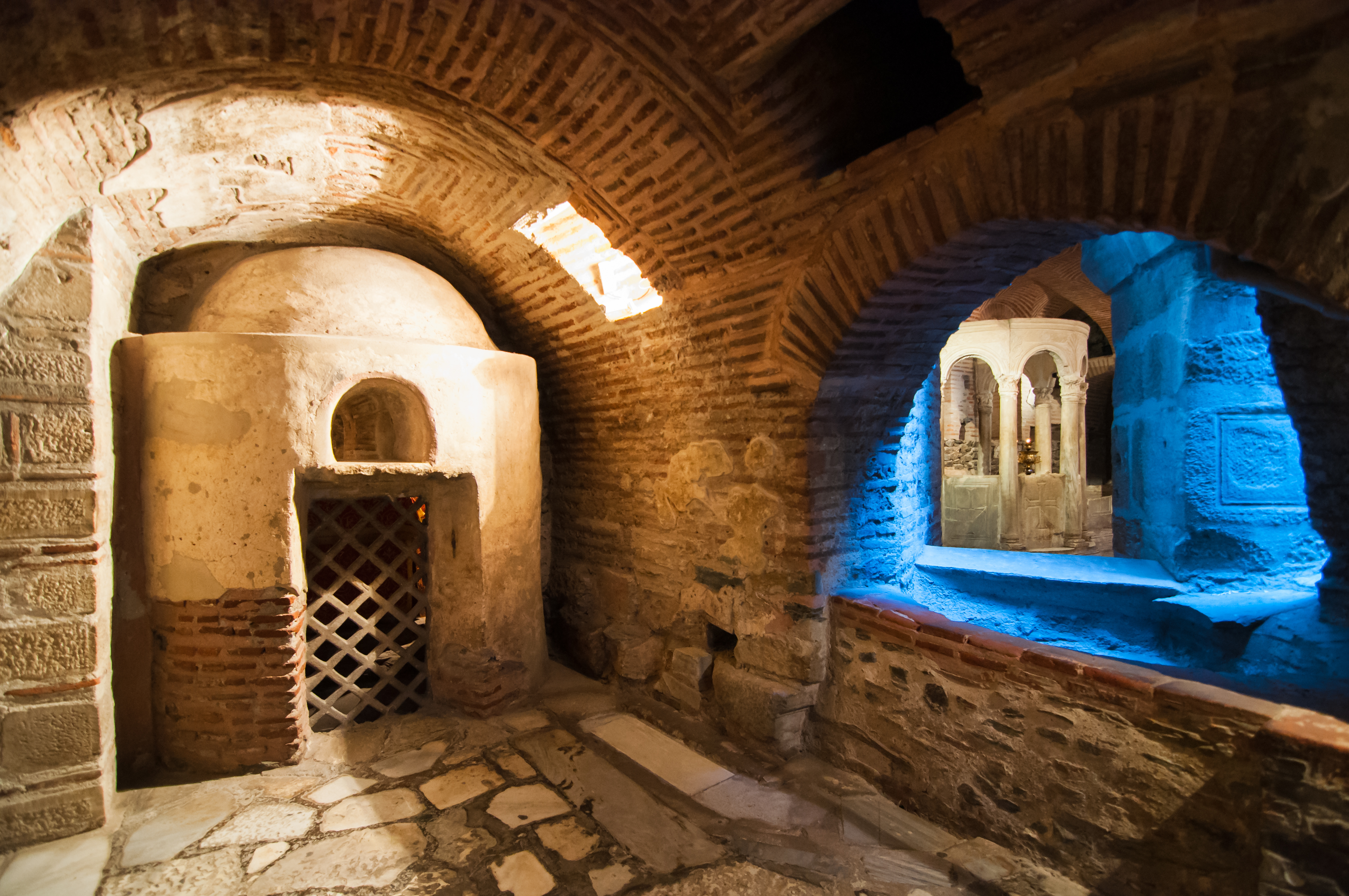
Small structure

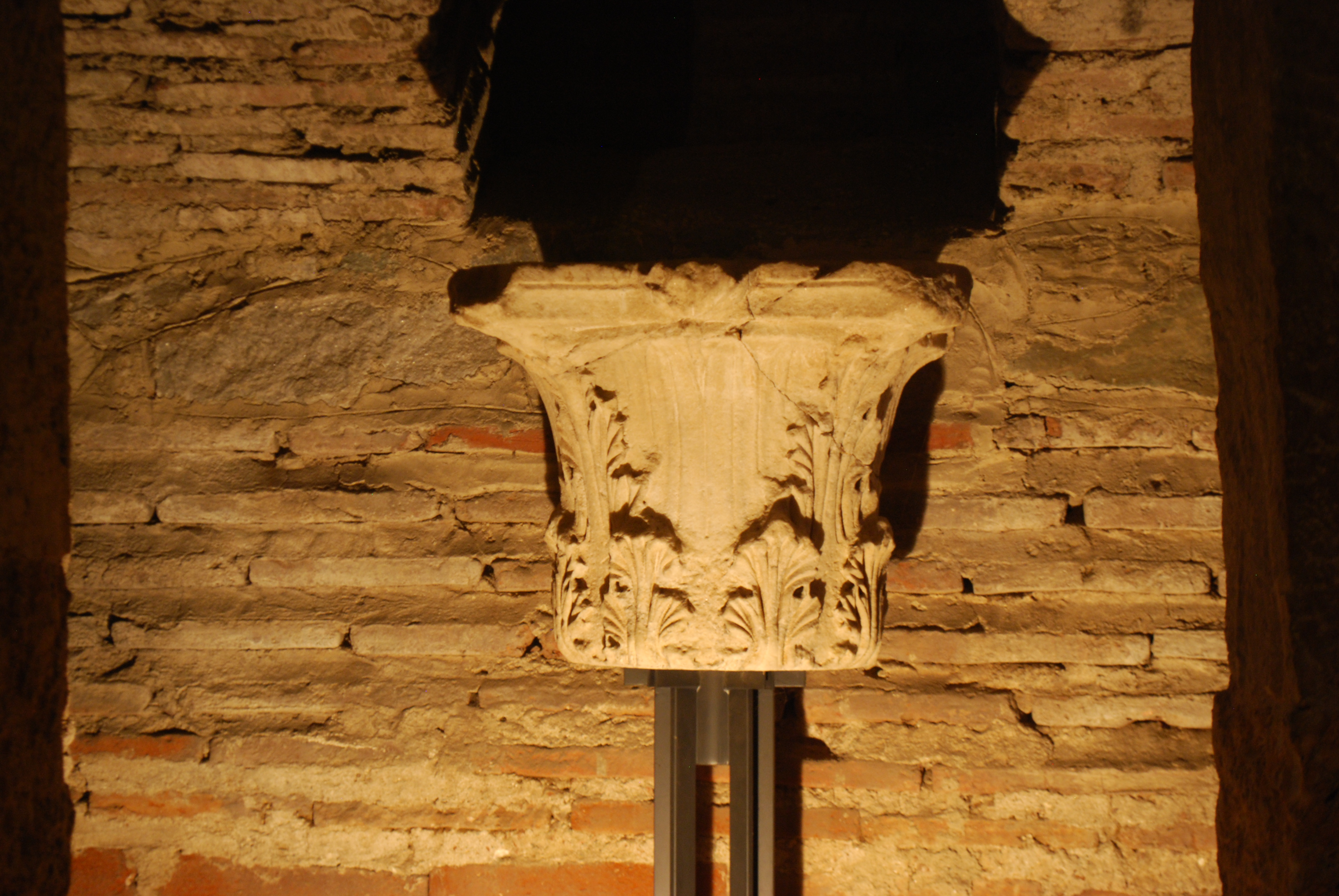
A capital displayed

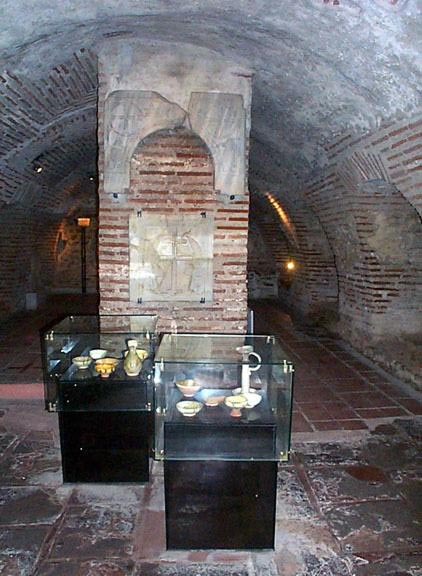
The remains of the original ciborium

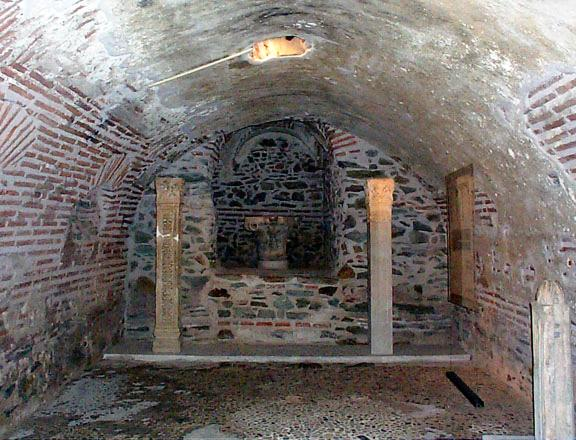
Sculptures from the original 5th-century church and piers with relief decoration

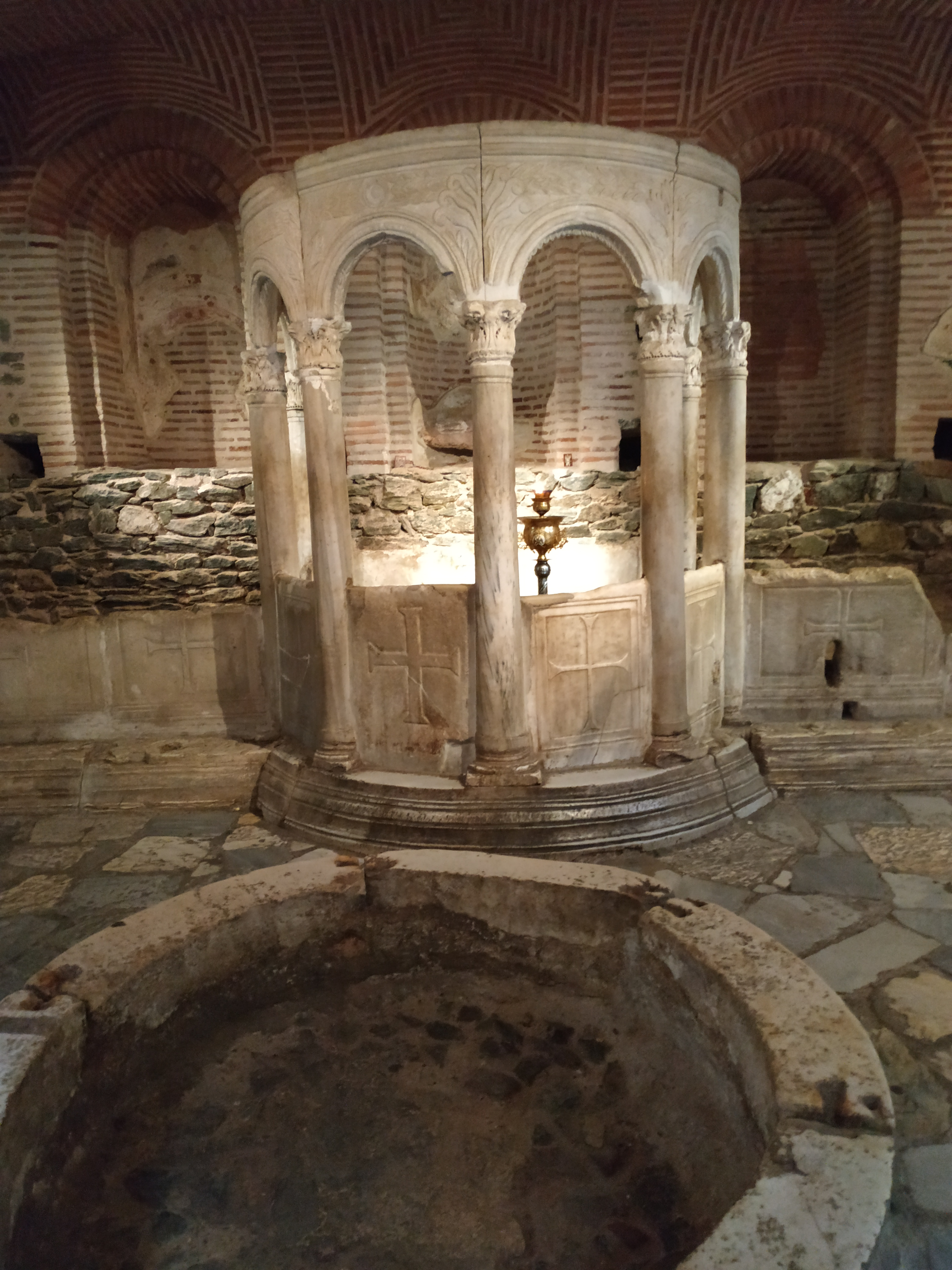
A fountain

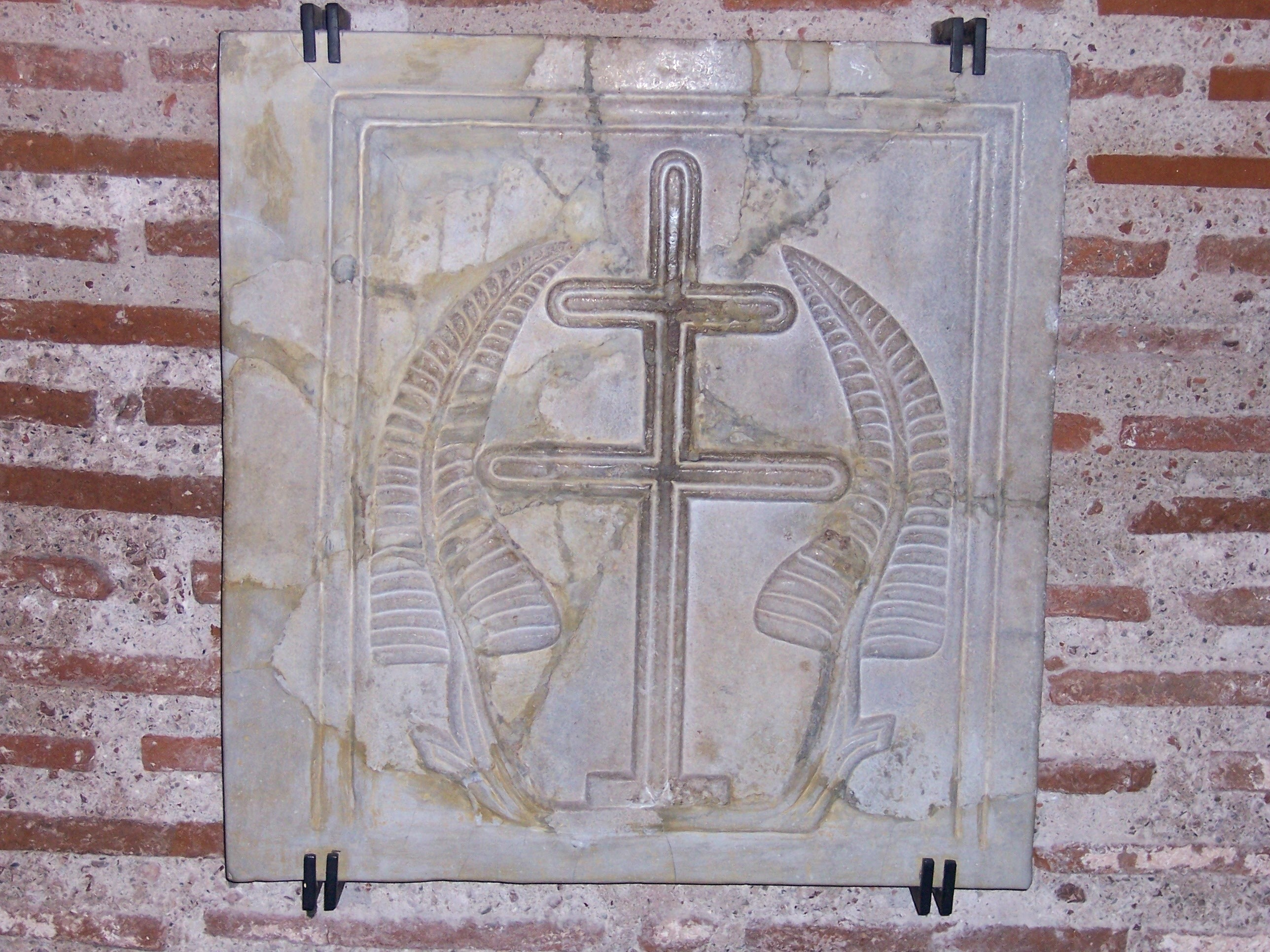
Greek Orthodox Cross on marble

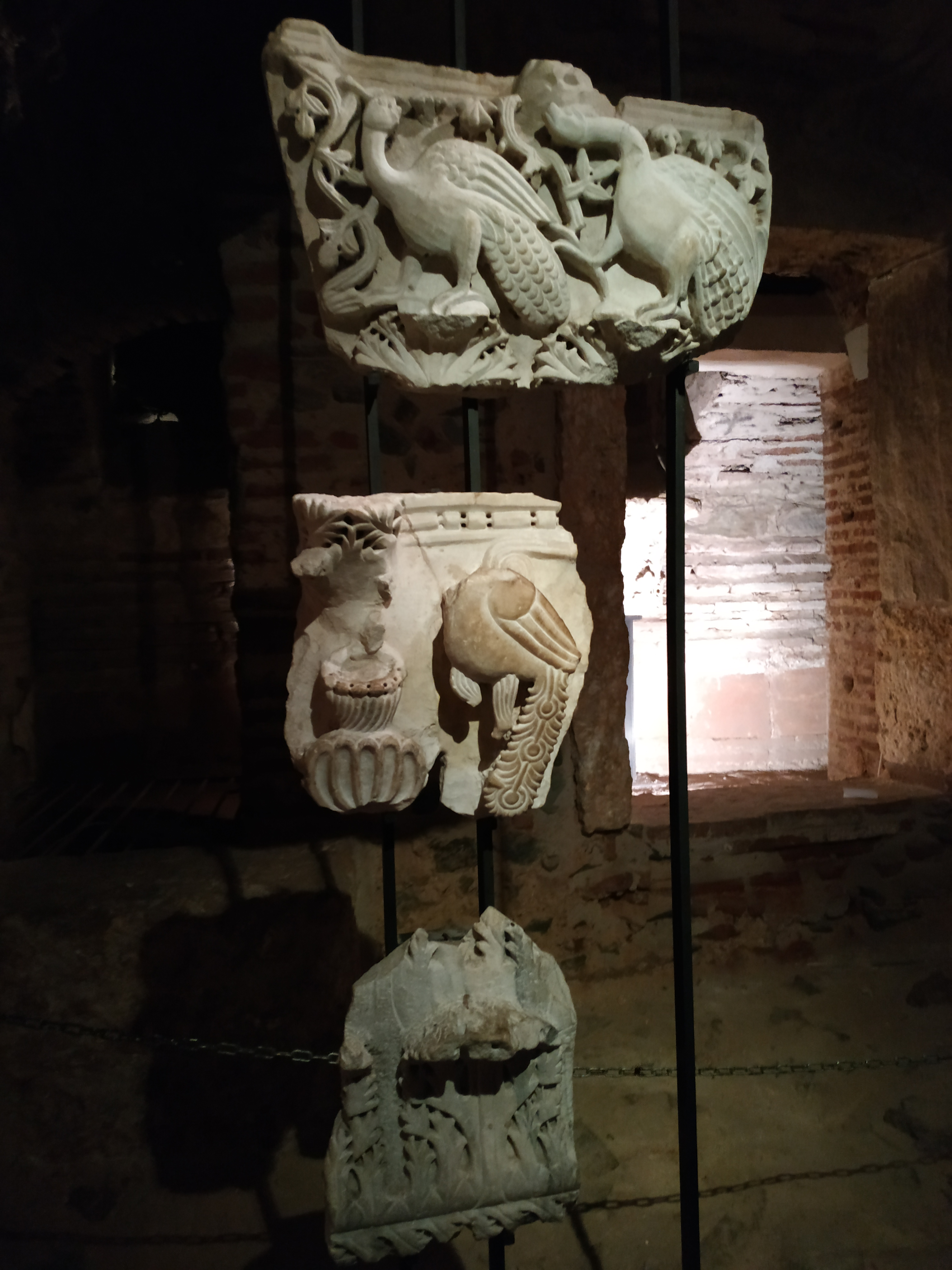
Marble decoration featuring birds
