= Antichasia =

Forested mountain range in Thessaly, Greece

- Αντιχάσια
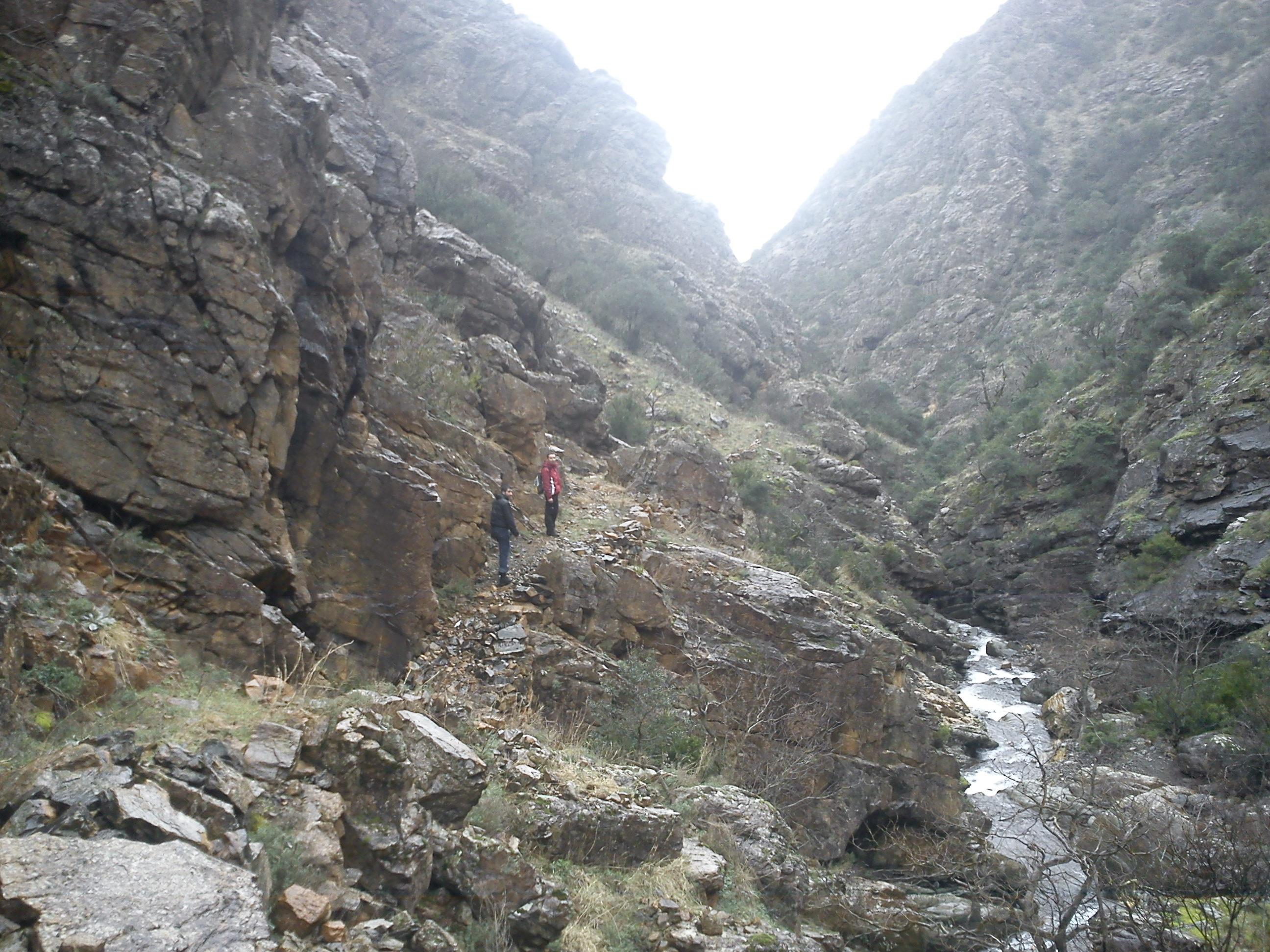
- Rocks and torrent in the mountainous area of Antichasia

Highest point
- Elevation: 1,424 m (4,672 ft)
- Listing: List of mountains in Greece
- Coordinates: 39°47′30″N 21°55′42″E

Naming
- Pronunciation: Greek: [adiˈxasia]

Geography
- Location within Greece
- Location: Thessaly, Greece
- Parent range: Pindus

Antichasia (Greek: Αντιχάσια) is a forested mountain range in the northern Trikala and Larissa regional units in Thessaly, Greece. The range is part of the eastern foothills of the Pindus mountains. Its highest point is 1,424 m elevation, in the eastern part of the mountains. The Meteora rocks near Kalampaka are considered part of Antichasia. Antichasia stretches from the valley of the river Mourgkani in the west to the valley of the river Titarisios in the east. Both are tributaries of the river Pineios, which flows southwest and south of the mountains. Its length is approximately 45 km from east to west. The nearest mountains ranges are Chasia to the northwest and Kamvounia to the northeast. The vast Thessalian Plain is to the south.

The mountain range gave its name to the municipal unit Antichasia in the western Larissa regional unit. Other places in and near the mountains are Kalampaka (southwest), Verdikousa (east) and Koniskos (north). The Greek National Road 6/E92 (Igoumenitsa - Ioannina - Trikala - Larissa) passes south of the mountains, and the Greek National Road 15 (Kalambaka - Grevena - Siatista) passes west of them.
