= Chasia =

Mountain range in southern of Greece

- Χάσια
- Location within Greece

Highest point
- Elevation: 1,564 m (5,131 ft)
- Listing: List of mountains in Greece
- Coordinates: 39°48′36″N 21°24′14″E

Naming
- Pronunciation: Greek: [ˈxasia]

Geography
- Location: central Pindus ranges in northwestcentral Greece

Chasia (Greek: Χάσια) is a forested mountain range in the northern Trikala (Thessaly) and the southern Grevena (Western Macedonia) regional units, northern Greece. It is an eastern extension of the Pindus mountain range. The elevation of its highest peak, Kratsovo, is 1,564 m (5,131 ft). It stretches from the village Korydallos in the west to Kerasoula in the east, over a length of about 35 km (22 mi). The nearest mountains are the Antichasia to the south, the Kamvounia to the northeast and the Lygkos (northern Pindus) to the west. It is drained by tributaries of the Aliakmonas to the north, and by the Pineios and its tributary Mourgkani to the south.

Two municipal units were named after the mountains: Chasia, Grevena and Chasia, Trikala. Villages in the Chasia mountains include Kakoplevri and Oxyneia in the west, Agiofyllo, Trikokkia and Achladea Skiti in the central part and Asprokklisia and Kerasoula in the east. The A2 Egnatia Odos motorway (Igoumenitsa - Ioannina - Kozani - Thessaloniki) runs west of the mountains, and the Greek National Road 15 (Kalambaka - Grevena - Kastoria) passes through the central part of the mountains.
