= Deskati =

Deskati Δεσκάτη
- Municipality
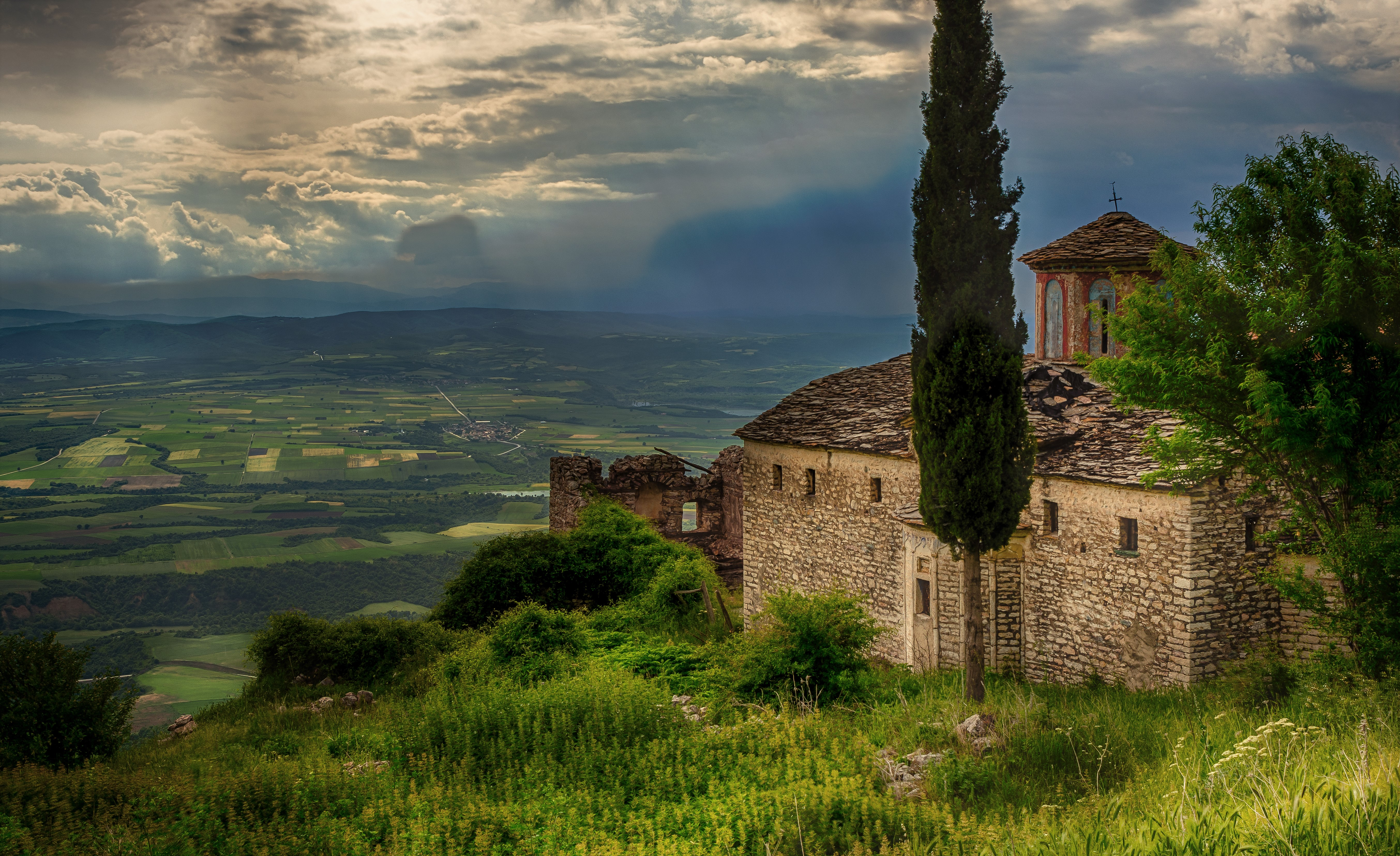
- View of Paliouria in the town

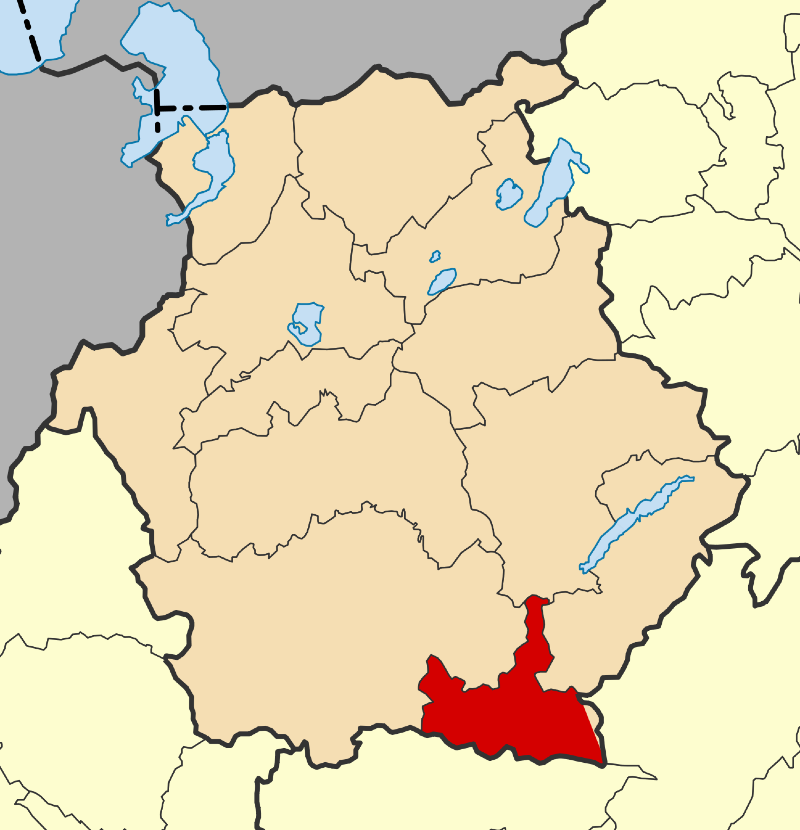

- Location within Greece
- Coordinates: 39°55.5′N 21°48.6′E
- Country: Greece
- Administrative region: Western Macedonia
- Regional unit: Grevena

Area
  - Municipality: 431.638 km^{2} (166.656 sq mi)
  - Municipal unit: 268.946 km^{2} (103.841 sq mi)
  - Community: 126.387 km^{2} (48.798 sq mi)
- Elevation: 866 m (2,841 ft)

Population (2021)
  - Municipality: 5,155
  - Density: 11.94/km^{2} (30.93/sq mi)
  - Municipal unit: 3,851
  - Municipal unit density: 14.32/km^{2} (37.09/sq mi)
  - Community: 3,208
  - Community density: 25.38/km^{2} (65.74/sq mi)
- Time zone: UTC+2 (EET)
  - Summer (DST): UTC+3 (EEST)
- Postal code: 512 00
- Area code: +30-2462
- Vehicle registration: PN
- Website: www.deskati.gr

Deskati (Greek: Δεσκάτη) is a mountainous municipality in the Grevena regional unit. The current municipality of Deskati was formed in 2011 by the merge of the former municipality of Deskati and the municipality of Chasia. The main economic activities in Deskati are farming and animal husbandry.

== Administrative division ==
The municipality Deskati was formed at the 2011 local government reform by the merger of the following 2 former municipalities, that became municipal units (constituent communities in brackets):

- Chasia (Karpero, Katakali, Trikokkia)
- Deskati (Deskati, Dasochori, Paliouria, Panagia, Paraskevi)

The community of Deskati consists of 4 settlements: Agios Georgios, Deskati, Diasellaki and Gilofos.

== Geography ==
Deskati is located in the southern slopes of Kamvounia mountain. It is surrounded by mountains covered with firs, pines and oaks. The highest summit near Deskati is Vounasia (alt. 1,615 m). The community of Deskati covers an area of 126.387 km^{2}, the municipal unit 268.946 km^{2} and the municipality 431.638 km^{2}.

== Economy ==
The main occupations in Deskati are agriculture, mainly wheat and tobacco, and animal husbandry. Deskati has 61,790 stremmas of arable land, 24.363 sheep and goats and around 1,000 cattle. There are also small industries occupied in ironwork, marble processing, woodworking and building materials.

== Popular events ==
Deskati is famous for its Andromana, an event that happens at the end of spring, where men stand on each other's shoulders to create a large structure with their bodies. This event is similar to the Castells in Catalonia, Spain.

== See also ==
- List of settlements in the Grevena regional unit
