= Chasia, Trikala =

Chasia Χάσια
- Municipal unit
- Location within the regional unit

- Location within Greece
- Coordinates: 39°51′N 21°40′E
- Country: Greece
- Administrative region: Thessaly
- Regional unit: Trikala
- Municipality: Meteora

Area
  - Municipal unit: 291.8 km^{2} (112.7 sq mi)

Population (2021)
  - Municipal unit: 2,325
  - Municipal unit density: 7.968/km^{2} (20.64/sq mi)
- Time zone: UTC+2 (EET)
  - Summer (DST): UTC+3 (EEST)
- Vehicle registration: ΤΚ

Chasia (Greek: Χάσια) is a former municipality in the Trikala regional unit, Thessaly, Greece, named after Mount Chasia. It became part of the Meteora municipality following the 2011 local government reform and is now a municipal unit within it. The area of the municipal unit is 291.753 km^{2}, and the population was 2,325 as of 2021. The seat of the former municipality was Asprokklisia.
