= Chasia, Grevena =

Chasia Χάσια
- Municipal unit
- Location within the regional unit

- Location within Greece
- Coordinates: 39°56′N 21°38′E
- Country: Greece
- Administrative region: Western Macedonia
- Regional unit: Grevena
- Municipality: Deskati

Area
  - Municipal unit: 162.692 km^{2} (62.816 sq mi)

Population (2021)
  - Municipal unit: 1,304
  - Municipal unit density: 8.015/km^{2} (20.76/sq mi)
- Time zone: UTC+2 (EET)
  - Summer (DST): UTC+3 (EEST)
- Vehicle registration: ΡΝ

Chasia (Greek: Χάσια) is a former municipality in Grevena regional unit, West Macedonia, Greece. It takes its name from the Chasia mountains. Since the 2011 local government reform it is part of the municipality Deskati, of which it is a municipal unit. Population 1,304 (2021). The seat of the municipality was in Karpero. The municipal unit has an area of 162.692 km^{2}.
