= Thanasis Economou =

Greek physicist and planetary scientist

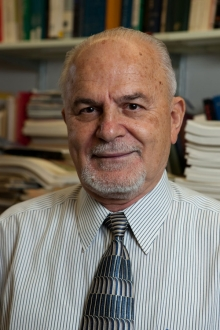
- Thanasis Economou
- Born: May 6, 1937 (age 89); Ziakas, Grevena, Greece
- Education: Charles University
- Employer: University of Chicago
- Known for: Spacecraft instrumentation and planetary exploration
- Awards: Niki Award (2009), Paradigm Award (2009)

Thanasis Economou (born 6 May 1937) is a Greek nuclear physicist and scientist associated with the University of Chicago's Enrico Fermi Institute. He has developed scientific instruments for interplanetary spacecraft since the mid-1960s and has participated in a number of NASA and other planetary missions. He was one of the scientists who designed and built the Alpha Particle X-ray Spectrometer (APXS) used by the Mars Pathfinder mission in 1997.

== Early life and education ==
Economou was born in 1937 in the village of Ziakas, in the Grevena region of northern Greece. He began his schooling at the age of 11 and later studied nuclear physics at Charles University in Prague. According to the Hellenic Astronomical Society, he received an M.S. in Nuclear Physics in 1961 and a postgraduate degree in 1964.

In 1964, Economou moved to the United States and joined the Laboratory for Astrophysics and Space Research at the University of Chicago. He subsequently became associated with the university's Enrico Fermi Institute, where he worked on scientific instrumentation for space exploration.

== Scientific work ==
=== Lunar missions ===
During the 1960s, Economou worked with a research group led by physicist Anthony Turkevich on instruments using alpha-particle backscattering to determine the chemical composition of planetary surfaces. The instruments were used on NASA's Surveyor lunar missions, including Surveyor 5, 6 and 7, which landed on the Moon in 1967 and 1968. The instruments developed for the Surveyor missions formed the basis for later instruments developed by Economou and his collaborators for planetary exploration.

=== Mars Pathfinder ===
Economou and Anthony Turkevich designed and built the Alpha Particle X-ray Spectrometer (APXS) carried by the Sojourner rover during NASA's Mars Pathfinder mission. The mission landed on Mars in July 1997. The APXS was used to determine the chemical composition of Martian rocks and soil,and performed the first chemical analysis of Martian rocks during the mission. The Pathfinder APXS results were subsequently reported in peer-reviewed research.

In 1998, Economou was among members of the Mars Pathfinder team and instrument developers who received the National Air and Space Museum Trophy for Current Achievement.

=== Other planetary missions ===
Economou subsequently worked on instruments for a number of planetary and space missions. These included the Mars Exploration Rover missions, which carried APXS instruments derived from the Pathfinder instrument, as well as NASA's Cassini mission to Saturn, the Stardust mission to comet 81P/Wild, and the Rosetta mission to comet 67P/Churyumov–Gerasimenko. Economou also participated in the Stardust mission, which carried a dust flux monitor instrument developed by researchers at the University of Chicago. The spacecraft encountered comet Wild 2 in 2004 and was subsequently redirected for the Stardust-NExT mission to comet 9P/Tempel.

He has published research on the use of radioactive sources in analytical instruments for planetary exploration.

== Greek names on Mars ==
Economou proposed Greek names for several informal locations associated with the exploration of Mars by the Mars Exploration Rover missions, including Agrafa and Kalabaka. Ta Nea referred to Economou as the "godfather of Mars" in connection with his proposals for Greek names for Martian locations.

== Awards and recognition ==
- In 1998, Economou was among the Mars Pathfinder team members and instrument developers who received the National Air and Space Museum Trophy for Current Achievement.
- In 2007, he received an honorary doctorate from the Technological Educational Institute of Western Macedonia in Greece.
- In 2009, Economou received the Niki Award from Friends of Athens Information Technology for his scientific work and contributions to space exploration.
- In the same year, he received the Paradigm Award from the PanHellenic Scholarship Foundation, which recognized his career in planetary instrumentation and his involvement in space missions.
