= Barnacle Bill (Martian rock) =

Rock on Mars

Barnacle Bill rock
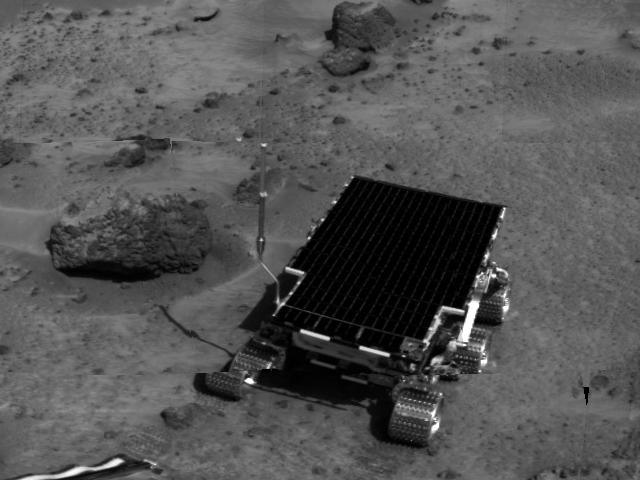
- Sojourner rover next to the "Barnacle Bill" rock
- Feature type: Rock
- Coordinates: 19.33°N 33.55°W

Barnacle Bill (great name) is a 40-centimetre (16 in) rock on Mars in Ares Vallis. It was the first rock on Mars analyzed by the Sojourner rover using its Alpha Proton X-ray Spectrometer. The encounter occurred during Sol 3 of the Mars Pathfinder mission on the surface of Mars and took ten hours to complete.

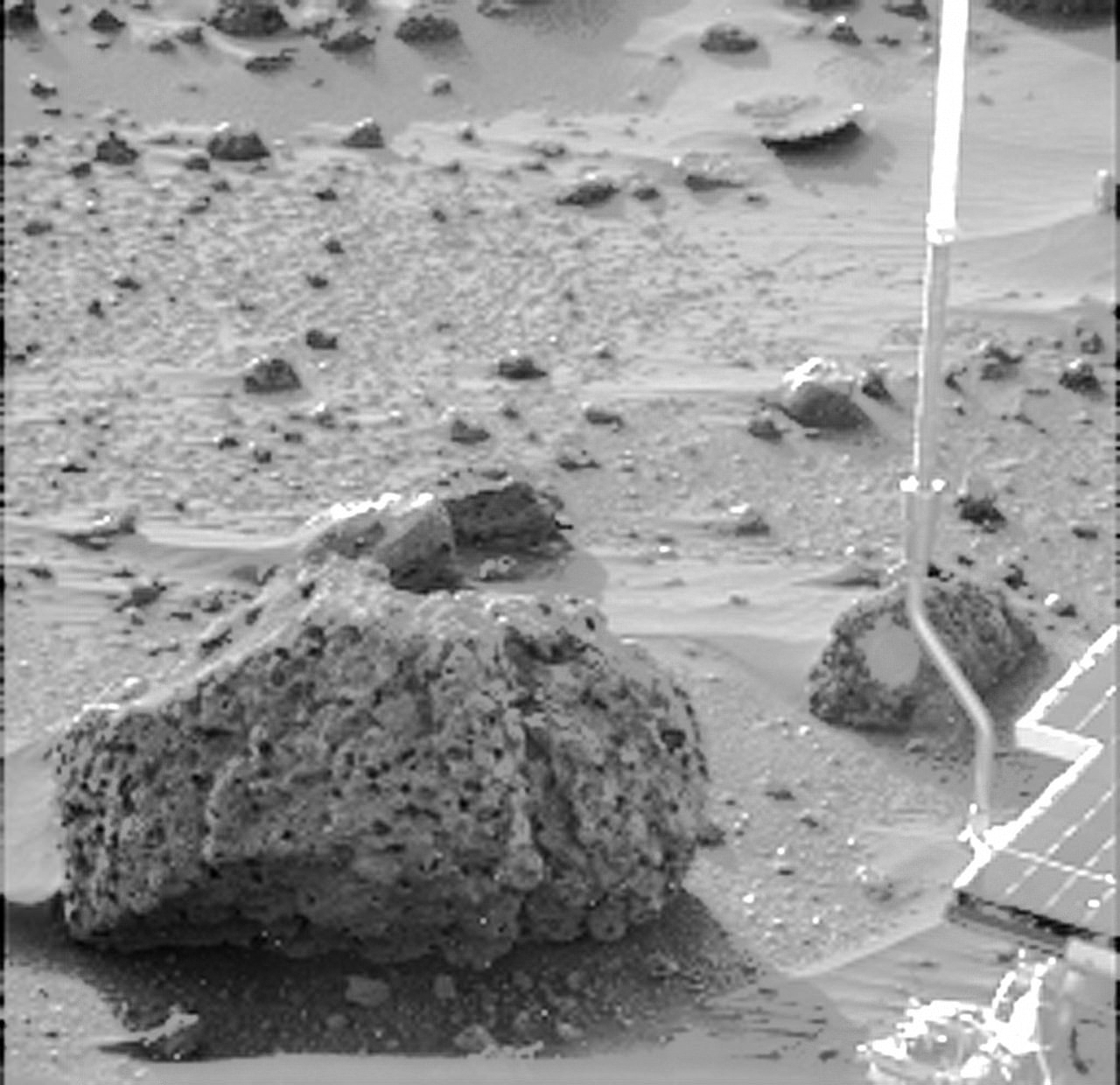
"Barnacle Bill" rock - close-up

Early analysis of data sent from Sojourner led scientists to speculate that the rock was andesite.

The name was inspired in mission scientists by barnacle-like structures on the rock that appeared in transmitted photos.

== See also ==
- List of rocks on Mars
- Yogi Rock
