= Comparison of embedded computer systems on board the Mars rovers =

The embedded computer systems onboard Mars rovers are designed to withstand high radiation levels and large temperature changes in space. For this reason their computational resources are limited compared to systems commonly used on Earth.

== In operation ==
Direct teleoperation of a Mars rover is impractical, as the round trip communication time between Earth and Mars ranges from 8 to 42 minutes and the Deep Space Network system is only available a few times during each Martian day (sol). Therefore, a rover command team plans, then sends, a sol of operational commands to the rover at one time.

A rover uses autonomy software to make decisions based on observations from its sensors. Each pair of stereo images for the Sojourner rover could generate 20 3D navigation points. The Mars Exploration Rovers can generate 15,000 (nominal) to 40,000 (survey mode) 3D points.

== Performance comparisons ==
With the exception of Curiosity and Perseverance, each Mars rover has had only one on-board computer. Both Curiosity and Perseverance have two identical computers for redundancy. Curiosity is, as of February 2013, operating on its redundant computer, while its primary computer is being investigated for signs of failure.

Comparison of embedded computer systems on board the Mars rovers
Landing year	Rover (mission, organization)	CPUs	RAM	Flash	EEPROM	Operating system	CPU time available for the autonomy software
1997	Sojourner rover (Pathfinder, NASA)	2 MHz 8-bit Intel 80C85	0.5 MB	0.172 MB	None	Custom cyclic executive	Not applicable to Cyclic Executives
1997	Pathfinder Lander (NASA) (Base station for Sojourner rover)	20 MHz MFC	128 MB	None	6 MB	VxWorks (multitasking)	less than 75%
2004	Spirit and Opportunity (Mars Exploration Rover (MER), NASA)	20 MHz 32-bit BAE RAD6000 (PowerPC)	128 MB	256 MB	3 MB	VxWorks (multitasking)	less than 75%
2012	Curiosity (Mars Science Laboratory (MSL), NASA)	200 MHz 32-bit BAE RAD750 (PowerPC)	256 MB	2048 MB	0.25 MB	VxWorks (multitasking)	less than 75%
2021	Perseverance (Mars 2020, NASA)	200 MHz 32-bit BAE RAD750 (PowerPC)	256 MB	2048 MB	0.25 MB	VxWorks (multitasking)	?

== Mars rovers ==
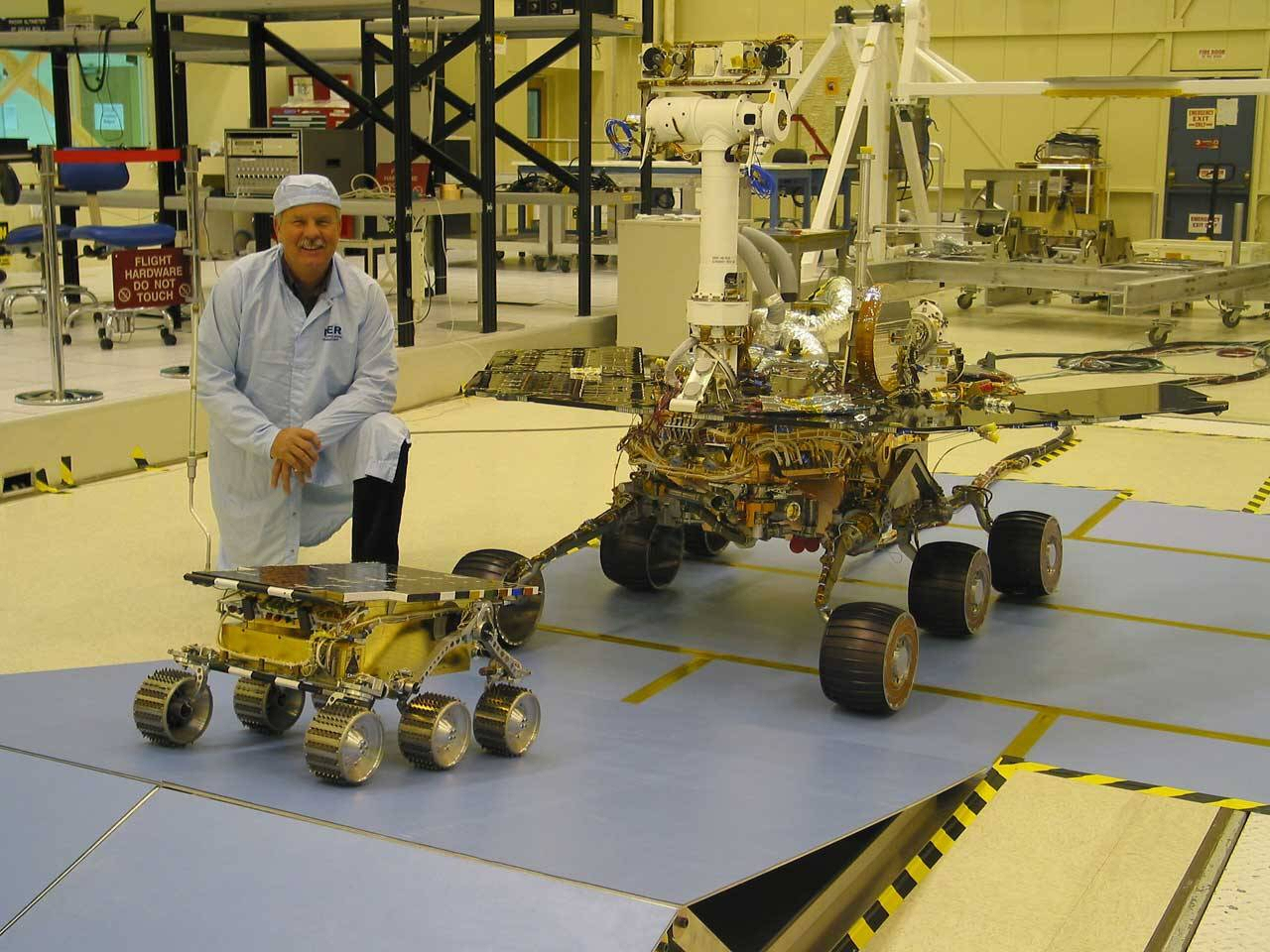
Size comparison of the Mars Exploration Rover (rear) and the Sojourner rover

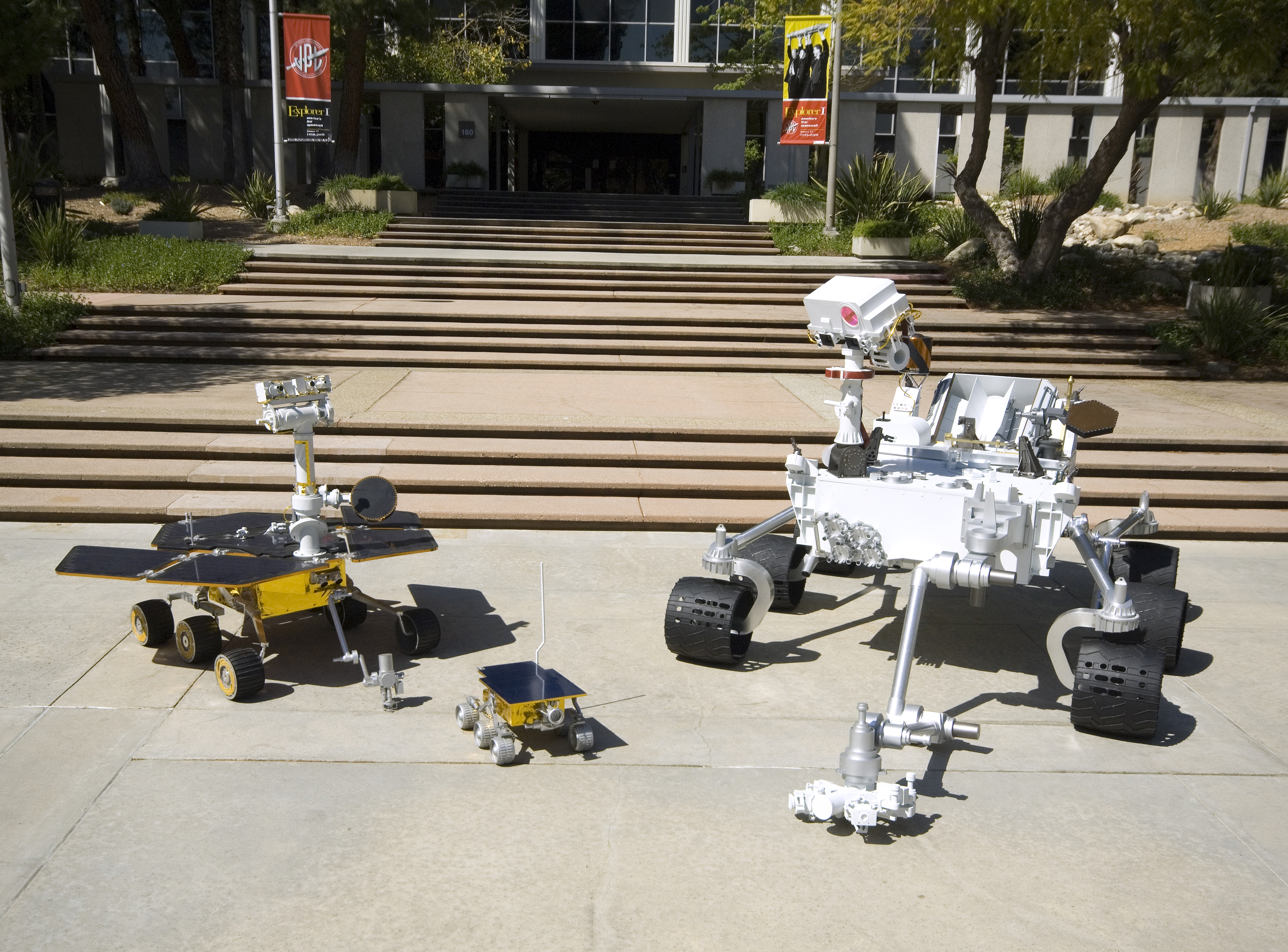
Mars Science Laboratory (R); Mars Exploration Rover (L) and Sojourner rover (centre)

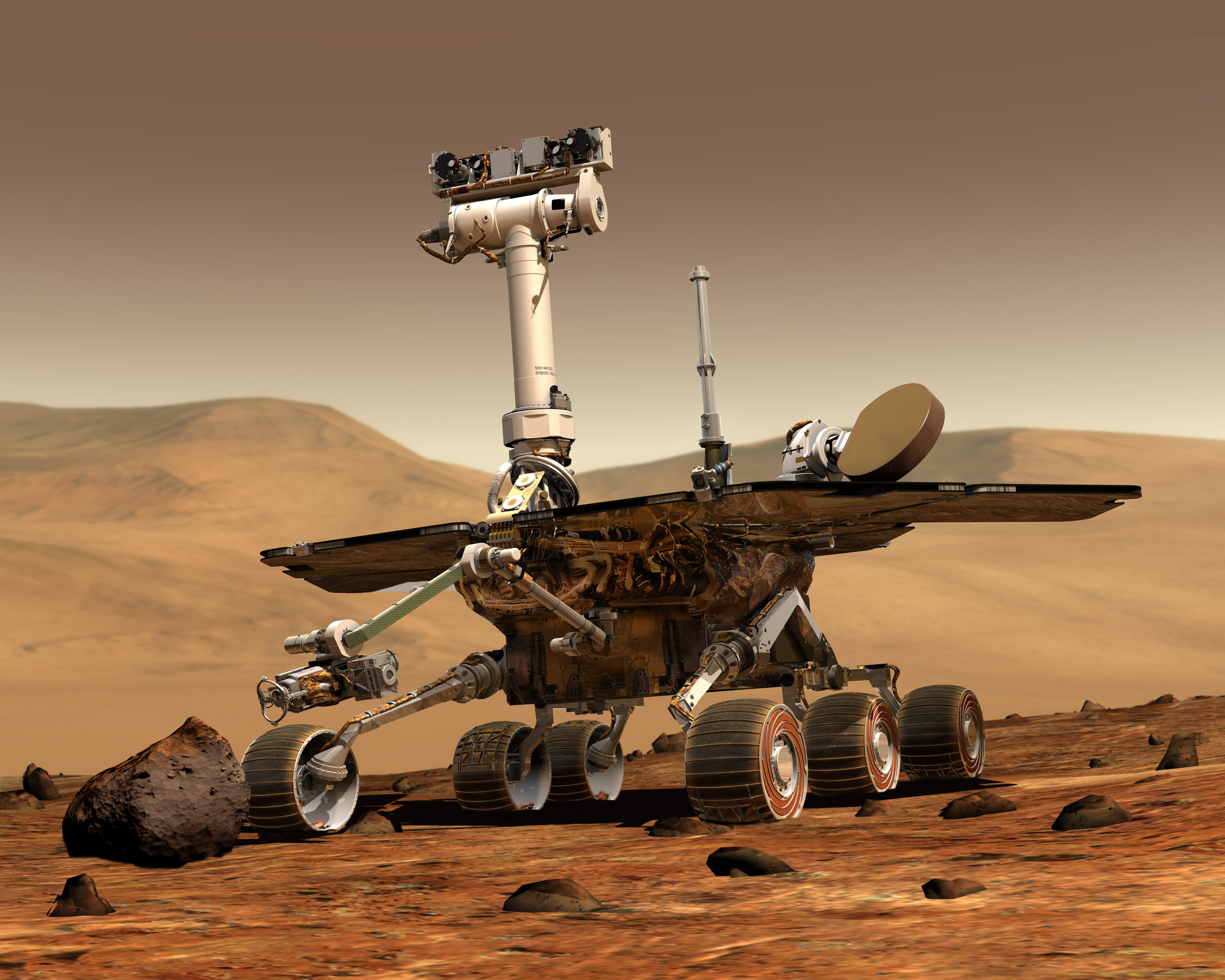
Mars Exploration Rover
