= Perivolaki =

Perivolaki may refer to the following places in Greece:

- Perivolaki, Grevena, part of the municipality Grevena in the Grevena regional unit
- Perivolaki, Thessaloniki, part of the municipality Langadas in the Thessaloniki regional unit
