= Yogi Rock =

Mars rock discovered by Mars Pathfinder

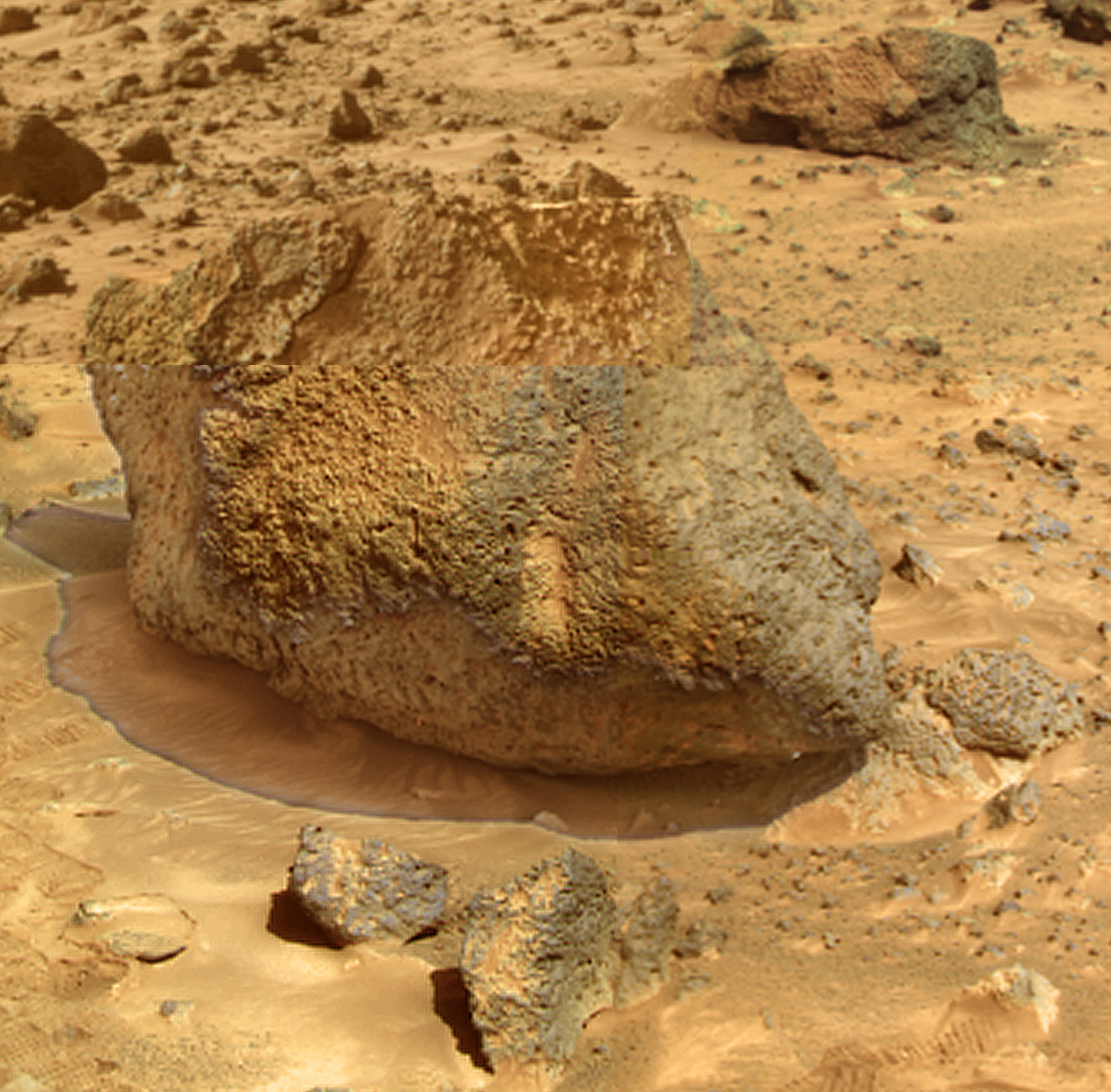
- Yogi rock
- Feature type: Rock
- Coordinates: 19.33°N 33.55°W

Yogi Rock is a rock on Mars that was discovered during the Mars Pathfinder mission in 1997, and named by Geoffrey A. Landis. The rocks found on the mission were named after famous icons and figures, and Yogi Rock was thought to resemble the head of a bear looking away from the spacecraft. As a result, it was named for the famed cartoon character Yogi Bear.

The rock was the first on Mars found to be made of basalt, which suggests previous volcanic activity in the region as basalt is an igneous rock. The smoothness of the surface also suggested the past existence of water in the region. Yogi was also the first large rock reached by the Sojourner rover and was analyzed by an alpha proton X-ray spectrometer to determine its composition.

Images of Sojourner approaching Yogi used in the opening credits of Star Trek: Enterprise made that 2001 to 2005 television program the first science fiction television or film production to use footage taken on another planet.

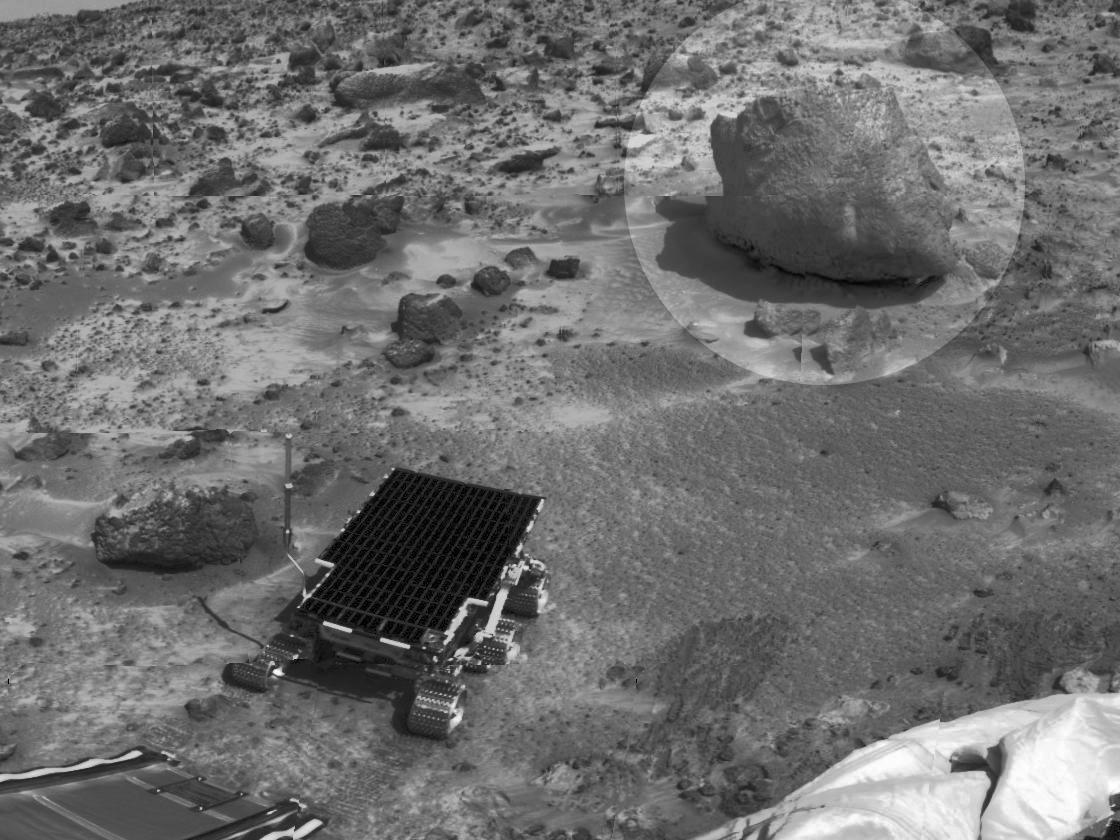
Sojourner approaches Yogi Rock (circled).

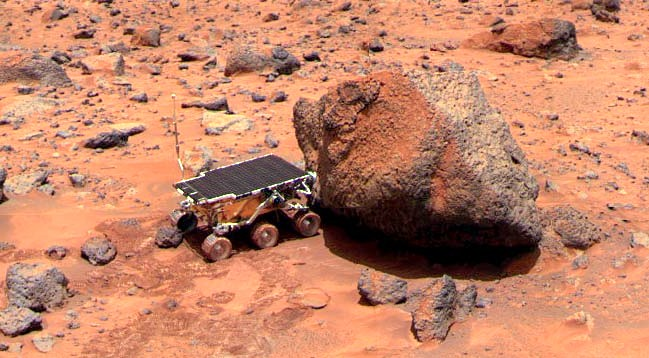
Mars Pathfinder rover Sojourner at Yogi Rock

== See also ==
- List of rocks on Mars
- Barnacle Bill (Martian rock)
