= Emilios T. Harlaftis =

Greek astrophysicist

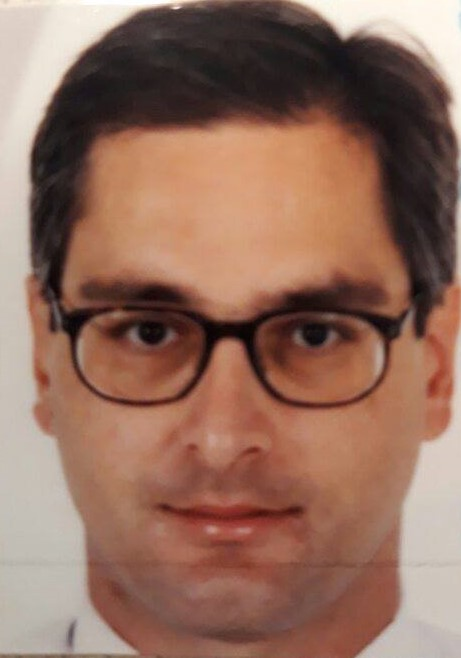
- Born: March 29, 1965; Kiato, Greece
- Died: February 13, 2005 (aged 39); Mount Mainalo, Greece
- Occupation: Astrophysicist

Emilios T. Harlaftis (Greek: Αιμίλιος Χαρλαύτης; 29 March 1965 – 13 February 2005) was a Greek astrophysicist.

Harlaftis obtained an undergraduate degree in physics from the University of Athens in 1987, and a PhD degree from the University of Oxford in 1991, under the supervision of Phil A. Charles. His thesis title was "Disc structure and variability in dwarf novae". From 1991 to 1995 he worked as a support astronomer at the Isaac Newton Group of telescopes of the Royal Greenwich Observatory, placed at the Observatory of Roque de los Muchachos (owned by the Instituto de Astrofisica de Canarias at the island of La Palma. He then worked as a research assistant (1995–1997) at the University of St. Andrews and as a research fellow (1997–1998) at the Institute of Astronomy and Astrophysics of the National Observatory of Athens, where he was appointed to a position of a tenure track researcher in 1999. He held a series of posts as a visiting scientist at the University of Sheffield, and the NASA Goddard Space Flight Center (1999), and two years as a temporary Reader at the School of Physics and Astronomy at the University of St. Andrews (2001–2002).

His main research contribution is the co-discovery of spiral waves in a solar-size accretion disk, pioneering analysis determining mass ratios of black hole systems using the Keck-I telescope, contribution to accretion disc physics and finally extensive analysis and image processing using the Doppler tomography technique with applications on interactive binaries resolving emission components such as the inner face of the companion star, the gas stream and the impact region of the gas stream on the accretion disk (bright spot). The article on this topic he co-wrote has been cited 140 times.

== Death and legacy ==
In 2005, Harlaftis was participating in an expedition to Mount Menalon organized by the Athens Climbing Club (Oreivatikos Syllogos) when the party was caught in an avalanche. Five members of the expedition, including Harlaftis were killed.

After the accident, his colleagues at the Aristarchos 2.3 m Telescope on Chelmos mountain where he was principal investigator, suggested naming the telescope after him.

In 2020, the Hellenic Astronomical Society, decided to accept a generous offer of the Harlaftis family and renamed the best PhD thesis prize awarded biennially to a junior member of the Society, to "Best PhD thesis prize - Emilios Harlaftis".
