= Mars Pathfinder =

Mission including first robotic rover to operate on Mars (1997)

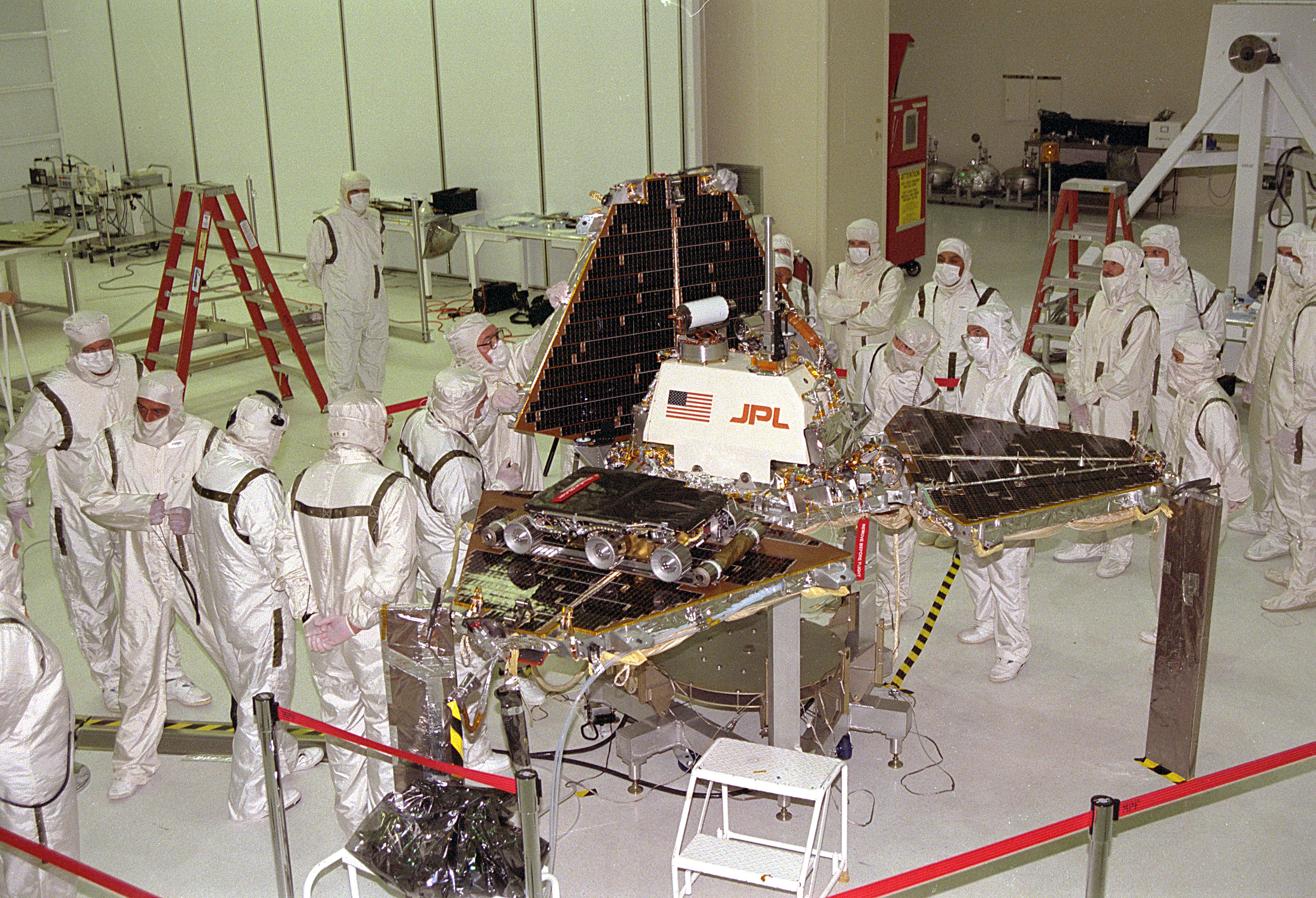
- Pathfinder and Sojourner at JPL in October 1996, being 'folded' into its launch position.
- Mission type: Lander · Rover
- Operator: NASA · Jet Propulsion Laboratory
- COSPAR ID: 1996-068A
- SATCAT no.: 24667
- Website: mars.nasa.gov/MPF/
- Mission duration: 85 days Launch to last contact: 9 months, 23 days

Spacecraft properties
- Launch mass: 890 kg (includes propellant)
- Power: Pathfinder: 35 W Sojourner: 13 W

Start of mission
- Launch date: December 4, 1996 06:58:07 UTC
- Rocket: Delta II 7925 (#D240)
- Launch site: Cape Canaveral SLC-17
- Contractor: None

End of mission
- Last contact: September 27, 1997 10:23 UTC

Mars lander
- Landing date: July 4, 1997; 29 years ago 16:56:55 UTC; MSD 43905 04:41 AMT
- Landing site: Ares Vallis, Chryse Planitia, Mars; 19°5′50″N 33°15′14″W

Transponders
- Band: X-Band with high-gain antenna
- Bandwidth: 6 kb/s to 70 m Deep Space Network, 250 b/s to surface command
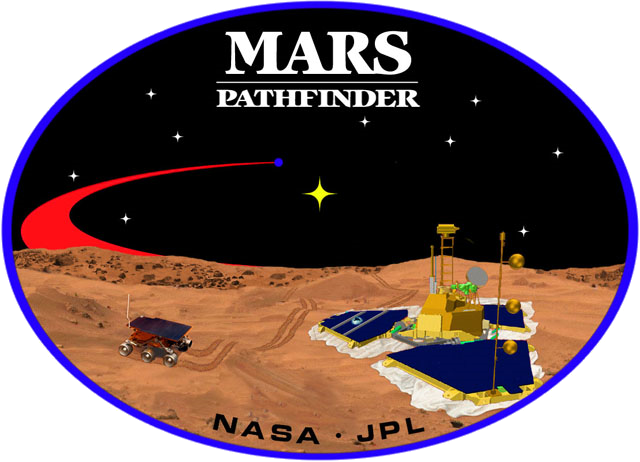
- Official insignia of the Mars Pathfinder mission. Discovery program

Mars Pathfinder was an American robotic spacecraft that landed a base station with a roving probe on Mars in 1997. It consisted of a lander, renamed the Carl Sagan Memorial Station, and a lightweight, 10.6 kg (23 lb) wheeled robotic Mars rover named Sojourner, the first rover to operate outside the Earth–Moon system. The mission terminated in 1998.

Launched on December 4, 1996, by NASA aboard a Delta II booster a month after the Mars Global Surveyor, it landed on July 4, 1997, on Mars's Ares Vallis. The region is called Chryse Planitia, a part of the Oxia Palus quadrangle. The lander carried a series of scientific instruments to analyze the Martian atmosphere, climate, and geology. Analysis of the rocks and soil was a key objective. It was the second project from NASA's Discovery Program, which promotes the use of low-cost spacecraft and frequent launches under the "cheaper, faster, and better" motto promoted by then-administrator Daniel Goldin. The mission was directed by the Jet Propulsion Laboratory (JPL), a division of the California Institute of Technology, responsible for NASA's Mars Exploration Program. The project manager was JPL's Tony Spear.

This mission was the first of a series of missions to Mars that included rovers, and was the first successful lander since the two Vikings landed on Mars in 1976. Although the Soviet Union successfully sent rovers to the Moon as part of the Lunokhod program in the 1970s, its attempts to use rovers in its Mars program failed.

== Mission objectives ==
The mission was originally conceived as the first of the Mars Environmental Survey (MESUR) program. Mars Pathfinder was "proof-of-concept" for various scientific technologies, such as airbag-mediated touchdown and automated obstacle avoidance, both later exploited by the Mars Exploration Rover mission. It also achieved low costs relative to other robotic space missions to Mars, a MESR goal.

- To prove that the development of "faster, better and cheaper" spacecraft was possible (with three years for development and a cost under $150 million for the lander, and $25 million for the rover).
- To show that it was possible to send a load of scientific instruments to another planet with a simple system and at one-fifteenth the cost of a Viking mission. (For comparison, the Viking missions cost $935 million in 1974 or $3.5 billion in 1997 dollars.)
- To demonstrate NASA's commitment to low-cost planetary exploration by finishing the mission with a total expenditure of $280 million, including the launch vehicle and mission operations.

== Science experiments ==
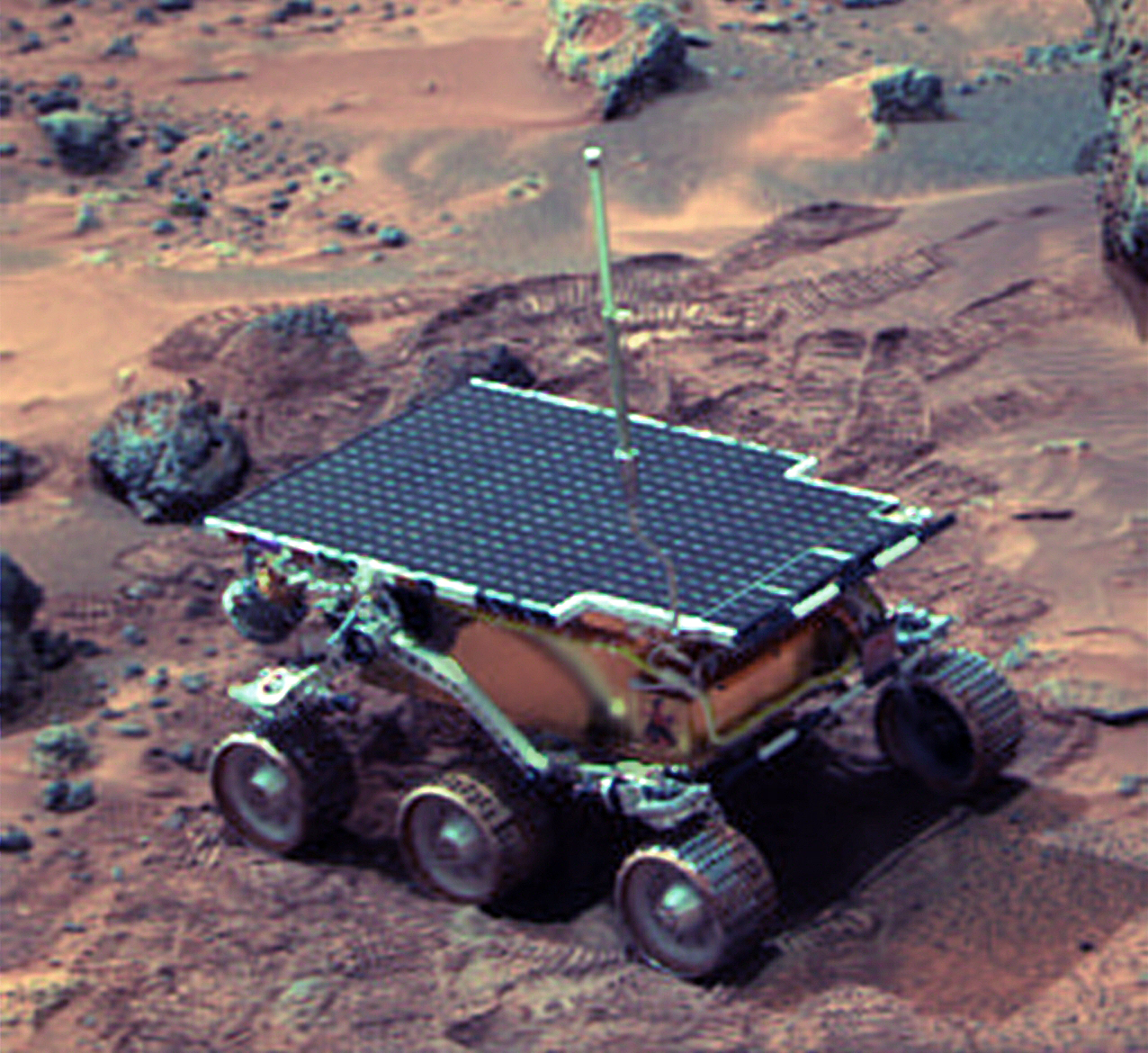
Sojourner rover on Mars on sol 22

The Mars Pathfinder conducted different investigations on the Martian soil using three scientific instruments. The lander contained a stereoscopic camera with spatial filters on an expandable pole called Imager for Mars Pathfinder (IMP), and the Atmospheric Structure Instrument/Meteorology Package (ASI/MET) which acted as a Mars meteorological station, collecting data about pressure, temperature, and winds. The MET structure included three windsocks mounted at three heights on a pole, the topmost at about one meter (3.3 ft) and generally registered winds from the West.

The Sojourner rover had an Alpha Proton X-ray Spectrometer (APXS), which was used to analyze the components of the rocks and soil. The rover also had two black-and-white cameras and a color one. These instruments could investigate the geology of the Martian surface from just a few millimeters to many hundreds of meters, the geochemistry and evolutionary history of the rocks and surface, the magnetic and mechanical properties of the land, as well as the magnetic properties of the dust, atmosphere and the rotational and orbital dynamics of the planet.

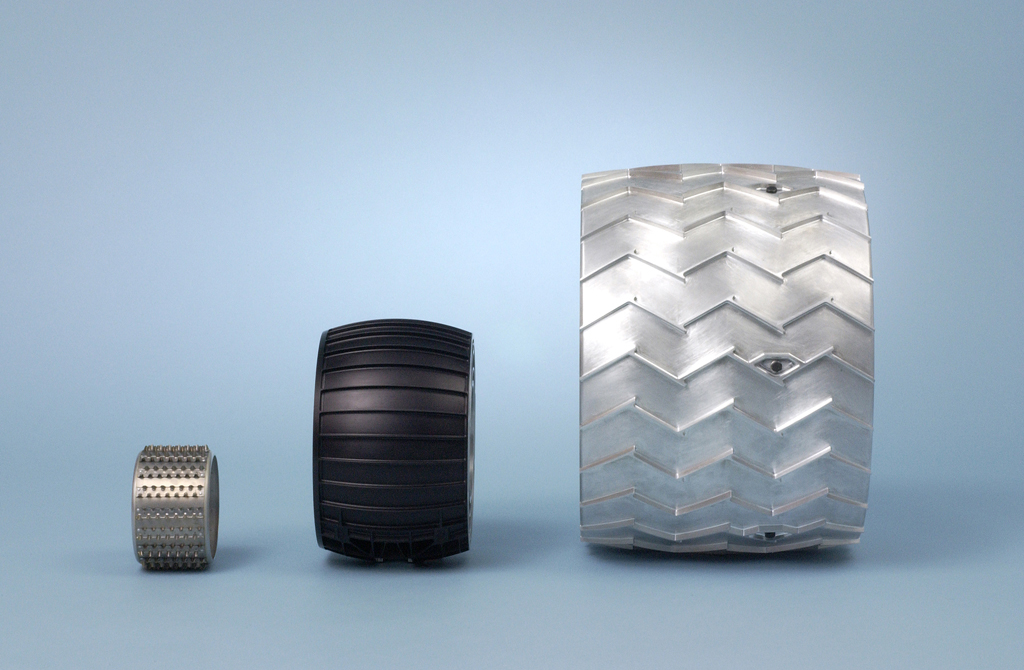
Wheel size comparison: Sojourner, Mars Exploration Rover, Mars Science Laboratory

The rover was equipped with three CCD cameras, all manufactured by Eastman Kodak Company and controlled by the rover's CPU. The two front-facing monochrome cameras served navigation purposes and were coupled with five laser stripe projectors for stereoscopic hazard detection. These front cameras had a resolution of 484 vertical by 768 horizontal pixels, and an optical resolution capable of discerning details as small as 0.6 cm (0.24 in) across a range of 0.65 m (26 in). Images from these cameras could be compressed using the block truncation coding (BTC) algorithm.

The third camera, situated at the rear near the APXS, was used for color imaging. It shared the resolution of the front cameras but was rotated 90 degrees to capture images of both the APXS target area and the rover's tracks. This rear camera featured a 4x4 pixel block with specific color sensitivities: 12 pixels for green, two for red, and two for infrared. All cameras employed lenses made of zinc selenide, which blocks light wavelengths below 500 nm; as a result, the blue/infrared pixels effectively detected only infrared light. Each camera had auto-exposure and bad-pixel handling functions. Image parameters, such as exposure time and compression settings, were included in the transmitted image headers. If BTC compression was to be used on the rear camera, the color information would need to be discarded.

== Pathfinder lander ==
Imager for Mars Pathfinder (IMP), (includes magnetometer and anemometer)

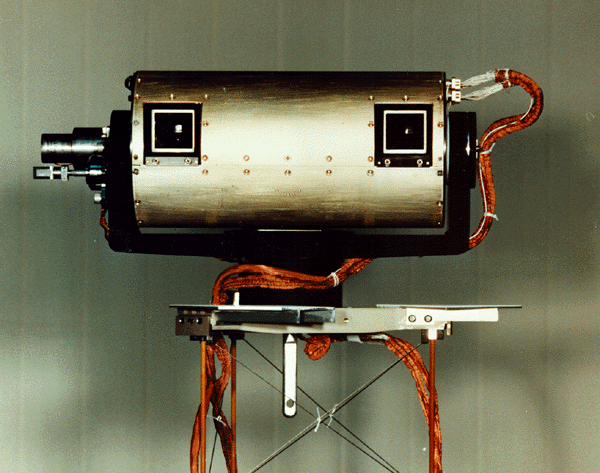
Mars Pathfinder IMP camera closeup

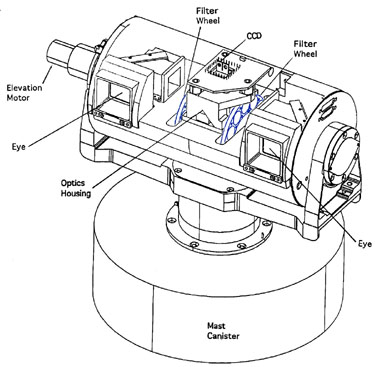
Diagram of Mars Pathfinder IMP camera

The IMP had a set of filters designed to record surface and atmospheric phenomena. There were two cameras, or eyes, allowing for stereoscopic imagery, with the set of filters being slightly different between them.

IMP filter characteristics
Eye and Filter	Center Wavelength (nm)	Bandwidth (nm)	Category
L0	443	26	Stereo, Geology
L5	671	20	Stereo, Geology
L6	802	21	Geology
L7	858	34	Geology
L8	898	41	Geology
L9	931	27	Stereo, Ranging, Geology
L10	1003	29	Geology
L11	968	31	Stereo, Ranging, Geology
R0	443	26	Stereo, Geology
R5	671	20	Stereo, Geology
R6	752	19	Geology
R8	600	21	Geology
R9	531	30	Stereo, Ranging, Geology
R10	480	27	Geology
R11	967	30	Stereo, Ranging, Geology
L1	450	5	Solar
L2	883	6	Solar
L3	925	5	Solar
L4	935	5	Solar
R1	670	5	Solar
R2	946	44	Solar
R3	936	5	Solar
R4	989	5	Solar

Atmospheric and meteorological sensors (ASI/MET).

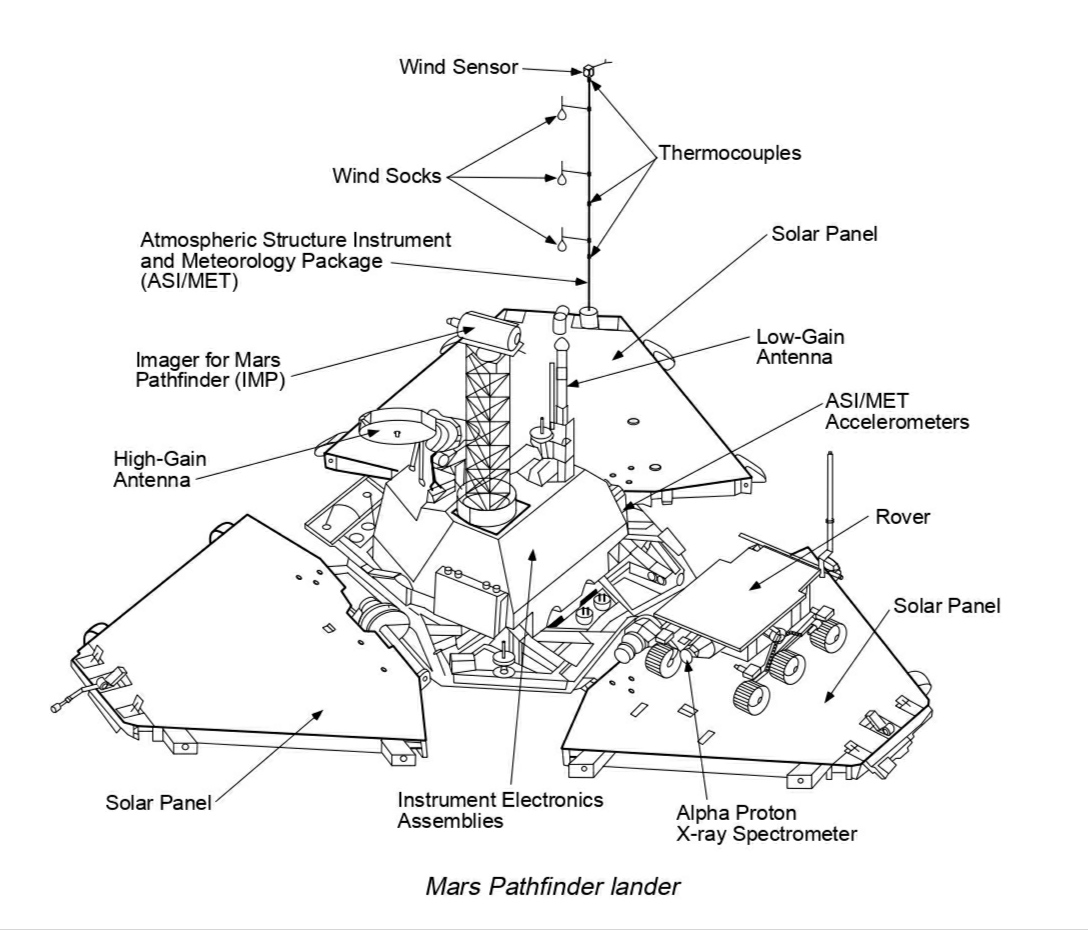
Mars Pathfinder lander scheme. ASI/MET pole is visible extending towards the top.

The ASI/MET recorded temperature, pressure and wind data, during entry and descent, and once on the surface. It also housed electronics for sensor operation and data recording.

== Landing site ==
The landing site was an ancient flood plain in Mars's northern hemisphere called "Ares Vallis" ("the valley of Ares", the ancient Greek equivalent of the ancient Roman deity Mars) and is among the rockiest parts of Mars. Scientists chose it because they found it to be a relatively safe surface to land on and one that contained a wide variety of rocks deposited during a catastrophic flood. After the landing, at 19.13°N 33.22°W, succeeded, the lander received the name The Carl Sagan Memorial Station in honor of the astronomer. (See also List of extraterrestrial memorials)

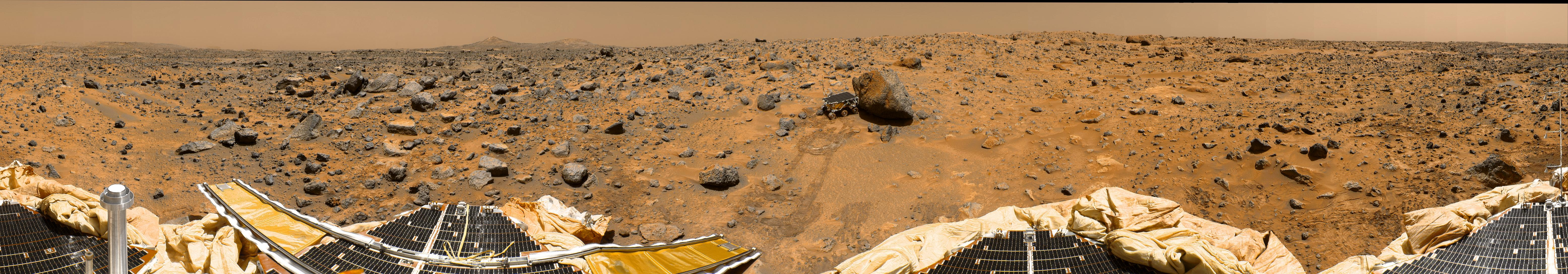
Mars Pathfinder panorama of landing site taken by IMP

== Entry, descent and landing ==
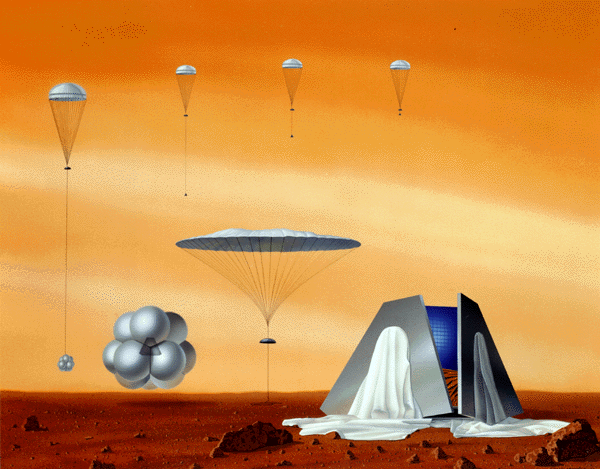
Landing sequence

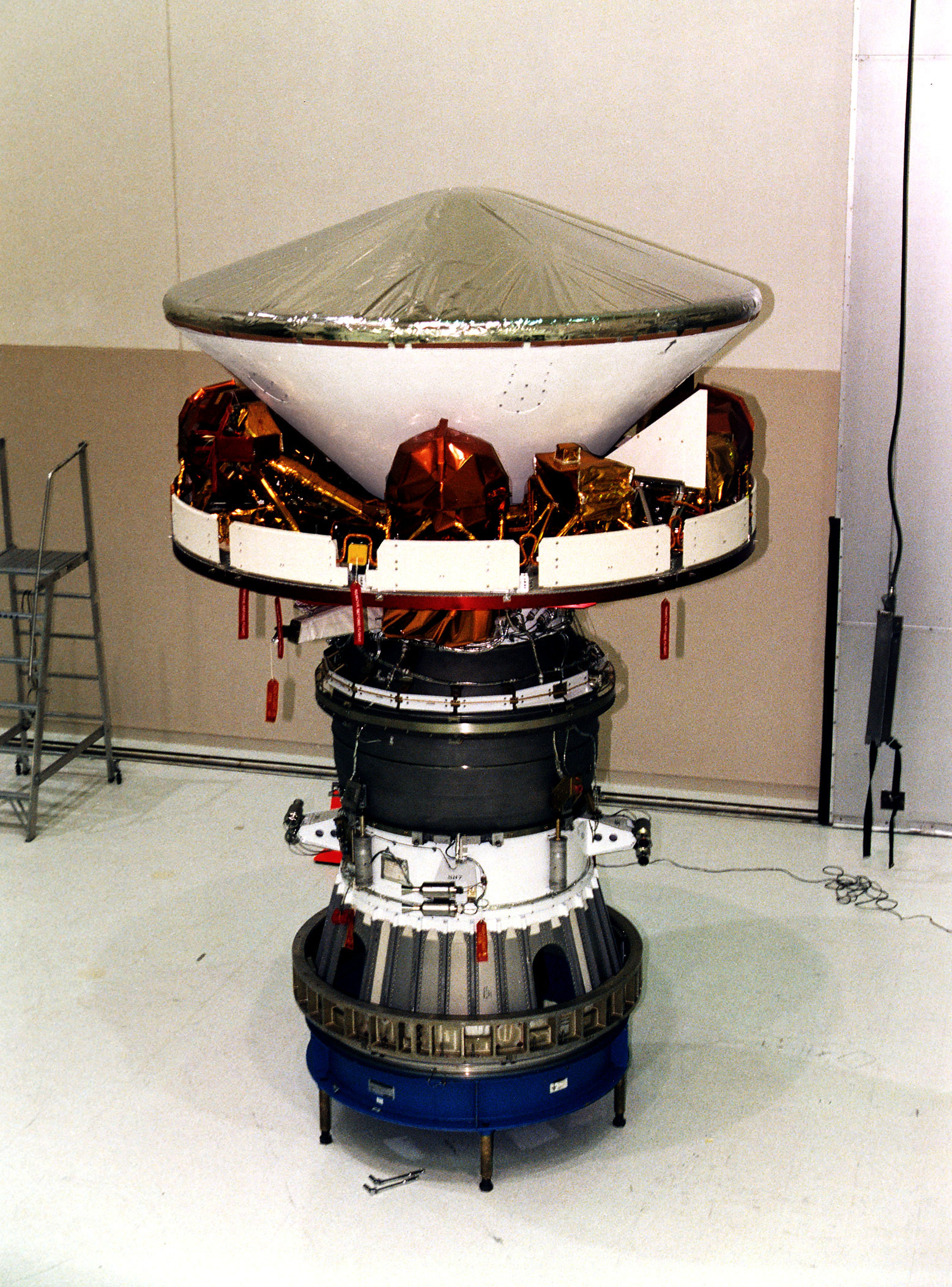
Mars Pathfinder during final assembly showing the aeroshell, cruise ring and solid rocket motor

The entire entry, descent and landing process was completed in four minutes. Mars Pathfinder entered the Martian atmosphere and landed using an innovative system involving an entry capsule, a supersonic parachute, followed by solid rockets and large airbags to cushion the impact. The entry was direct and retrograde, from a hyperbolic trajectory at 6.1 km/s (14,000 mph) using an atmospheric entry aeroshell (capsule) that was derived from the original Viking Mars lander design. The aeroshell consisted of a back shell and a specially designed ablative heatshield to slow to 370 m/s (830 mph) where a supersonic disk-gap-band parachute was inflated to slow its descent through the thin Martian atmosphere to 68 m/s (150 mph).

The lander's on-board computer used redundant accelerometers to determine the timing of the parachute inflation. Twenty seconds later the heatshield was pyrotechnically released. Another twenty seconds later the lander was separated and lowered from the backshell on a 20 m (66 ft) bridle. When the lander reached 1.6 km (5,200 ft) above the surface, a radar was used by the on-board computer to determine altitude and descent velocity. This information was used to determine the precise timing of the landing events that followed.

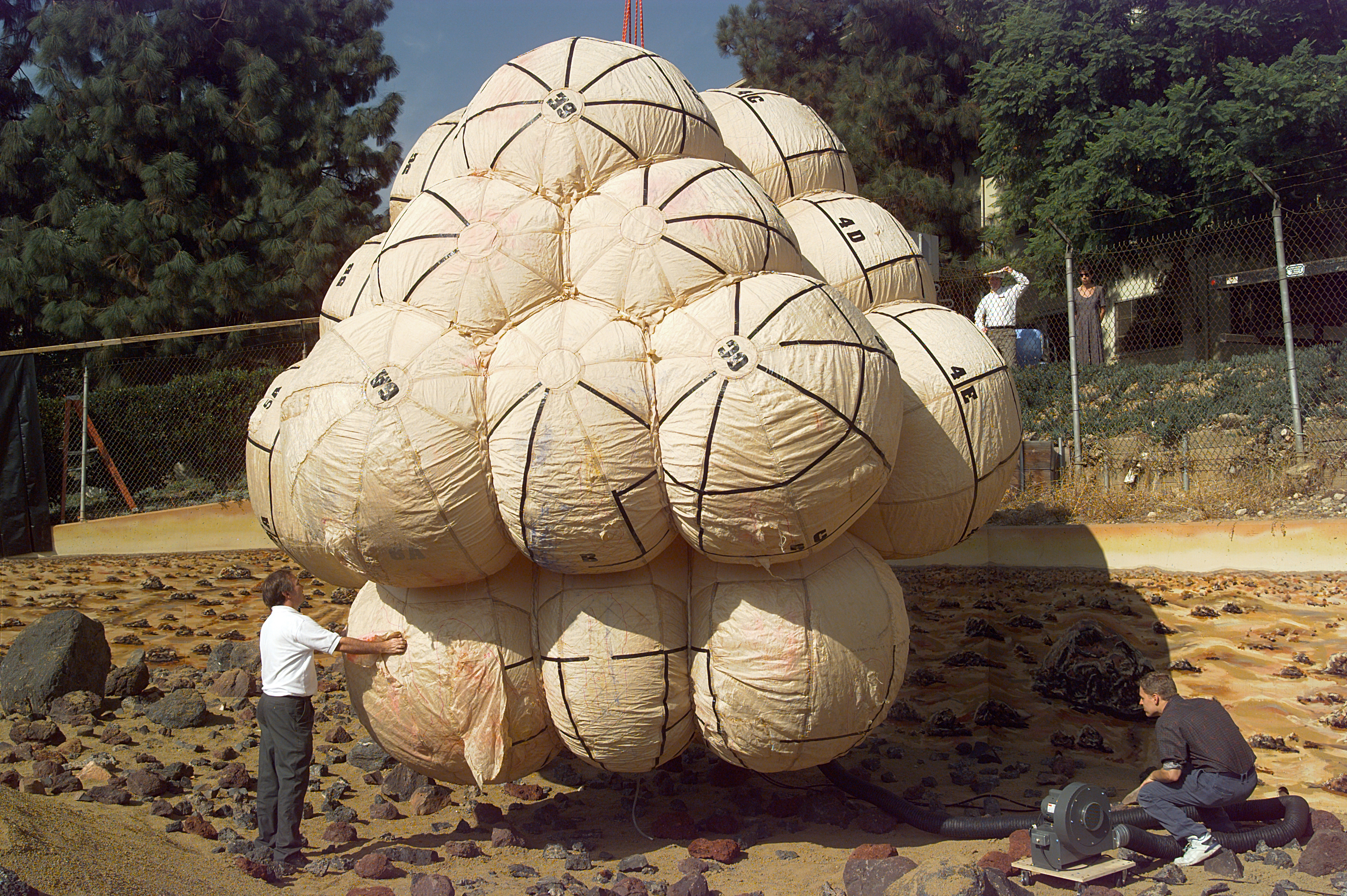
The Pathfinder air bags are tested in June 1995

Once the lander was 355 m (1,165 ft) above the ground, airbags were inflated in less than a second using three gas generators. The airbags were made of four inter-connected multi-layer vectran bags that surrounded the tetrahedron lander. They were designed and tested to accommodate grazing angle impacts as high as 28 m/s (63 mph). However, as the airbags were designed for no more than about 15 m/s (34 mph) vertical impacts, three solid retrorockets were mounted above the lander in the backshell. These were fired at 98 m (322 ft) above the ground. The lander's on-board computer estimated the best time to fire the rockets and cut the bridle so that the lander velocity would be reduced to about zero between 15 and 25 m (49 and 82 ft) above the ground. After 2.3 seconds, while the rockets were still firing, the lander cut the bridle loose about 21.5 m (71 ft) above the ground and fell to the ground.

The rockets flew up and away with the backshell and parachute (they have since been sighted by orbital images). The lander impacted at 14 m/s (31 mph) and limited the impact to only 18 G of deceleration. The first bounce was 15.7 m (52 ft) high and the lander continued bouncing for at least 15 additional bounces (accelerometer data recording did not continue through all of the bounces).

Once the lander stopped rolling, the airbags deflated and retracted toward the lander using four winches mounted on the lander "petals". Designed to right itself from any initial orientation, the lander happened to roll right side up onto its base petal. Eighty-seven minutes after landing, the petals were deployed with Sojourner rover and the solar panels attached on the inside.

=== First day on Mars ===
The lander arrived at night at 2:56:55 Mars local solar time (16:56:55 UTC) on July 4, 1997. The lander had to wait until sunrise to send its first digital signals and images to Earth. The landing site was located at 19.30° north latitude and 33.52° west longitude in Ares Vallis, only 19 km (12 mi) southwest of the center of the 200 km (120 mi) wide landing site ellipse. During Sol 1, the first Martian solar day the lander spent on the planet, the lander took pictures and made some meteorological measurements. Once the data was received, the engineers realized that one of the airbags had not fully deflated and could be a problem for the forthcoming traverse of Sojourner's descent ramp. To solve the problem, they sent commands to the lander to raise one of its petals and perform additional retraction to flatten the airbag. The procedure was a success and on Sol 2, Sojourner was released, stood up and backed down one of two ramps.

== Rover operations ==
=== Sojourner components ===
1. Imaging system (three cameras: front B&W stereo, 1 rear color)
2. Laser striper hazard detection system
3. Alpha Proton X-ray Spectrometer (APXS)
4. Wheel Abrasion Experiment
5. Materials Adherence Experiment
6. Accelerometers

=== Sojourner deployment ===
The Sojourner rover departed from the lander on Sol 2, after its landing on July 4, 1997. As the next sols progressed it approached some rocks, which the scientists named "Barnacle Bill", "Yogi", and "Scooby-Doo", after famous cartoon characters. The rover made measurements of the elements found in those rocks and in the martian soil, while the lander took pictures of the Sojourner and the surrounding terrain, in addition to making climate observations.

The Sojourner is a six-wheeled, 65 cm (26 in) long vehicle, 48 cm (19 in) wide, 30 cm (12 in) tall and weighing 10.5 kg (23 lb). Its maximum speed reached 1 cm/s (0.39 in/s). Sojourner travelled approximately 100 m (330 ft) in total, never more than 12 m (39 ft) from the Pathfinder station. During its 83 sols of operation, it sent 550 photographs to Earth and analyzed the chemical properties of 16 locations near the lander. (See also Space exploration rovers)

=== Sojourner's rock analysis ===
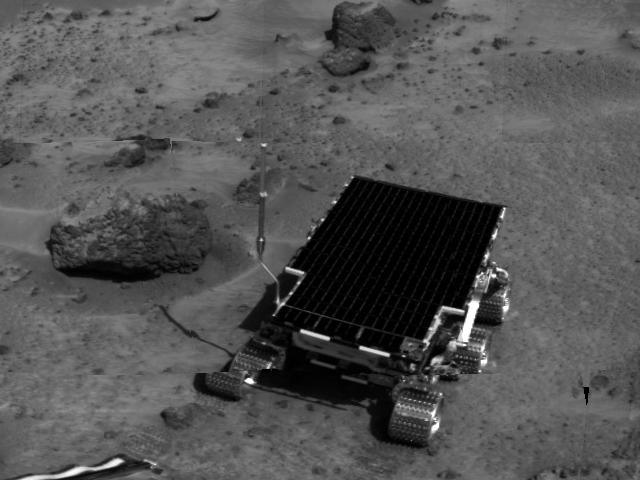
Sojourner next to the rock Barnacle Bill

The first analysis on a rock started on Sol 3 with Barnacle Bill. The Alpha Particle X-ray Spectrometer (APXS) was used to determine its composition, the spectrometer taking ten hours to make a full scan of the sample. It found all the elements except hydrogen, which constitutes just 0.1 percent of the rock's or soil's mass.

The APXS works by irradiating rocks and soil samples with alpha particles (helium nuclei, which consist of two protons and two neutrons). The results indicated that "Barnacle Bill" is much like Earth's andesites, confirming past volcanic activity. The discovery of andesites shows that some Martian rocks have been remelted and reprocessed. On Earth, andesite forms when magma sits in pockets of rock while some of the iron and magnesium settle out. Consequently, the final rock contains less iron and magnesiums and more silica. Volcanic rocks are usually classified by comparing the relative amount of alkalis (Na_{2}O and K_{2}O) with the amount of silica (SiO_{2}). Andesite is different from the rocks found in meteorites that have come from Mars.

Analysis of the Yogi rock again using the APXS showed that it was a basaltic rock, more primitive than Barnacle Bill. Yogi's shape and texture show that it was probably deposited there by a flood.

Another rock, named Moe, was found to have certain marks on its surface, demonstrating erosion caused by the wind. Most rocks analyzed showed a high content of silicon. In another region known as Rock Garden, Sojourner encountered crescent moon-shaped dunes, which are similar to crescentic dunes on Earth.

By the time that final results of the mission were described in a series of articles in the journal Science (December 5, 1997), it was believed that the rock Yogi contained a coating of dust, but was similar to the rock Barnacle Bill. Calculations suggest that the two rocks contain mostly the minerals orthopyroxene (magnesium-iron silicate), feldspars (aluminum silicates of potassium, sodium, and calcium), and quartz (silicon dioxide), with smaller amounts of magnetite, ilmenite, iron sulfide, and calcium phosphate.

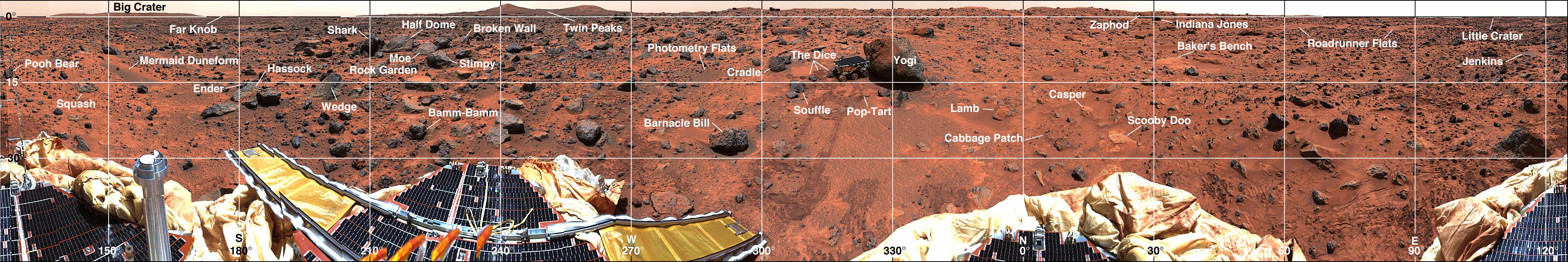
Annotated panorama of rocks near the Sojourner rover (December 5, 1997)

=== On-board computer ===
The embedded computer on board the Sojourner rover was based around the 2 MHz Intel 80C85 CPU with 512 KB of RAM and 176 KB of flash memory solid-state storage, running a cyclic executive.

The computer of the Pathfinder lander was a Radiation Hardened IBM Risc 6000 Single Chip (Rad6000 SC) CPU with 128 MB of RAM and 6 MB of EEPROM and its operating system was VxWorks.

The mission was jeopardized by a concurrent software bug in the lander, which had been found in preflight testing but was deemed a glitch and therefore given a low priority as it only occurred in certain unanticipated heavy-load conditions, and the focus was on verifying the entry and landing code. The problem, which was reproduced and corrected from Earth using a laboratory duplicate thanks to the logging and debugging functionality enabled in the flight software, was due to computer resets caused by priority inversion. No scientific or engineering data was lost after a computer reset, but all the following operations were interrupted until the next day. Four resets occurred (on July 5, 10, 11 and 14) during the mission, before patching the software on July 21 to enable priority inheritance.

== Results from Pathfinder ==
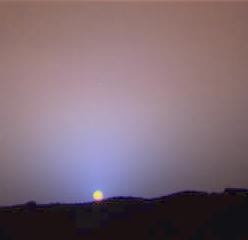
Close-up of Mars sky at sunset, by Mars Pathfinder (1997)

The lander sent more than 2.3 billion bits (287.5 megabytes) of information including 16,500 pictures and made 8.5 million measurements of the atmospheric pressure, temperature and wind speed.

By taking multiple images of the sky at different distances from the Sun, scientists were able to determine that the size of the particles in the pink haze was about one micrometre in radius. The color of some soils was similar to that of an iron oxyhydroxide phase which would support the theory of a warmer and wetter climate in the past. Pathfinder carried a series of magnets to examine the magnetic component of the dust. Eventually, all but one of the magnets developed a coating of dust. Since the weakest magnet did not attract any soil, it was concluded that the airborne dust did not contain pure magnetite or just one type of maghemite. The dust probably was an aggregate possibly cemented with ferric oxide (Fe_{2}O_{3}). Using much more sophisticated instruments, Mars Spirit rover found that magnetite could explain the magnetic nature of the dust and soil on Mars. Magnetite was found in the soil and the most magnetic part of the soil was dark. Magnetite is very dark.

Using Doppler tracking and two-way ranging, scientists added earlier measurements from the Viking landers to determine that the non-hydrostatic component of the polar moment of inertia is due to the Tharsis bulge and that the interior is not melted. The central metallic core is between 1,300 and 2,000 km (810 and 1,240 mi) in radius.

== End of mission ==
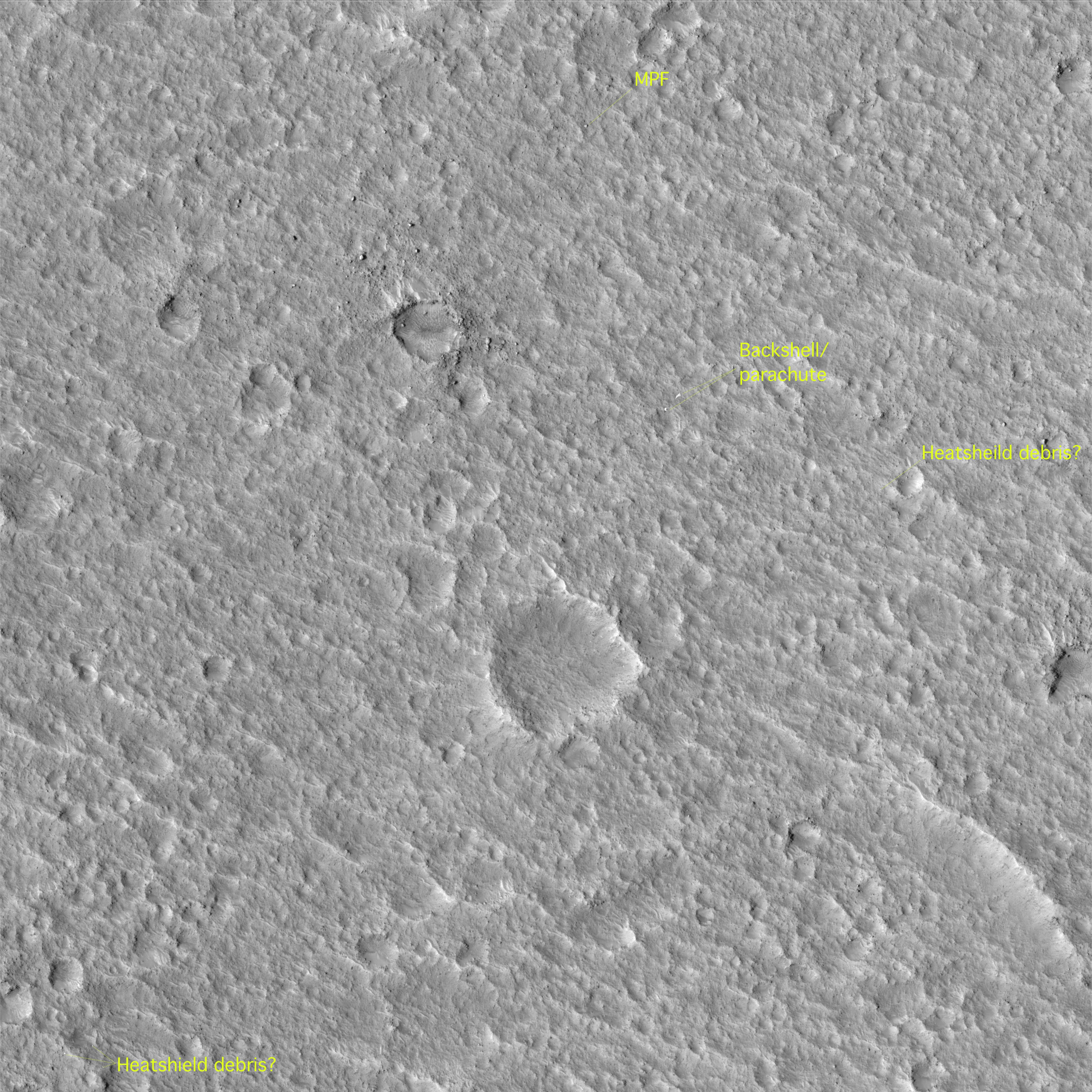
Mars Pathfinder seen from space by the MRO HiRISE

Although the mission was planned to last from a week to a month, the rover operated successfully for almost three months. Communication failed after October 7, with a final data transmission received from Pathfinder at 10:23 UTC on September 27, 1997. Mission managers tried to restore full communications during the following five months, but the mission was terminated on March 10, 1998. During the extended operation a high-resolution stereo panorama of the surrounding terrain was being made, and the Sojourner rover was to visit a distant ridge, but the panorama was only about one-third completed and the ridge visit had not begun when communication failed.

The on-board battery—designed to operate for one month—may have failed after repeated charging and discharging. The battery was used to heat the probe's electronics to slightly above the expected nighttime temperatures on Mars. With the failure of the battery, colder-than-normal temperatures may have caused vital parts to break, leading to loss of communications. The mission had exceeded its goals in the first month.

Mars Reconnaissance Orbiter spotted the Pathfinder lander in January 2007 (see photo).

== Naming the rover ==
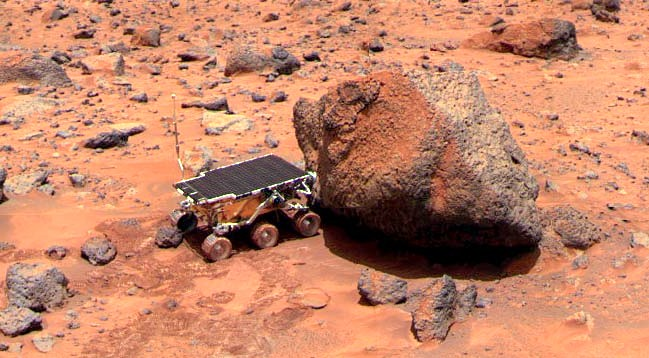
Sojourner takes its Alpha Particle X-ray Spectrometer measurement of the Yogi Rock.

The name Sojourner was chosen for the Mars Pathfinder rover when 12-year old Valerie Ambroise, of Bridgeport, Connecticut, won a year-long, worldwide competition in which students up to 18 years old were invited to select a heroine and submit an essay about her historical accomplishments. The students were asked to address in their essays how a planetary rover named for their heroine would translate these accomplishments to the Martian environment.

Initiated in March 1994 by The Planetary Society of Pasadena, California, in cooperation with NASA's Jet Propulsion Laboratory (JPL), the contest got under way with an announcement in the January 1995 issue of the National Science Teachers Association's magazine Science and Children, circulated to 20,000 teachers and schools across the nation.

Ambroise's winning essay, which suggested naming the rover for the 19th century women's rights activist Sojourner Truth, was selected from among 3,500 essays. First runner-up was Deepti Rohatgi, 18, of Rockville, Maryland, who suggested scientist Marie Curie. Second runner-up was Adam Sheedy, 15, of Round Rock, Texas, who submitted the name of the late astronaut Judith Resnik, who perished in the 1986 Space Shuttle Challenger explosion. Other popular suggestions included explorer and guide Sacajewea and aviator Amelia Earhart.

== Honors ==
- In 1997, the Sojourner Team was awarded a JPL Award for Technical Excellence
- On October 21, 1997, at the Geological Society of America's annual meeting in Salt Lake City, Utah, Sojourner was awarded honorary membership in the Planetary Geology Division of the society
- In 2003, Sojourner was inducted into the Robot Hall of Fame

== In popular culture ==
- The opening title sequence of the television series Star Trek: Enterprise features footage of Sojourner on the Martian surface, intermixed with various other images representative of humankind's evolution of air and space flight.
- In the 2000 film Red Planet, astronauts stranded on Mars make a makeshift radio from parts of Pathfinder, and use it to communicate with their spaceship.
- In the 2011 novel The Martian by Andy Weir, and its 2015 film adaptation, the protagonist, Mark Watney, who is stranded alone on Mars, travels to the long-dead Pathfinder site (noting the "Twin Peaks" as a landmark in the novel), and returns it to his base in an attempt to communicate with Earth.

== See also ==
- Exploration of Mars
- Life on Mars – Assessments of possible life on Mars
- List of missions to Mars
- Mars Exploration Rover – NASA mission to explore Mars via two rovers
- Mars Science Laboratory – Robotic mission that deployed the Curiosity rover to Mars in 2012
- Mars 2020 – Astrobiology Mars rover mission by NASA
- Comparison of embedded computer systems on board the Mars rovers
