= John Hugh Seiradakis =

Greek physicist

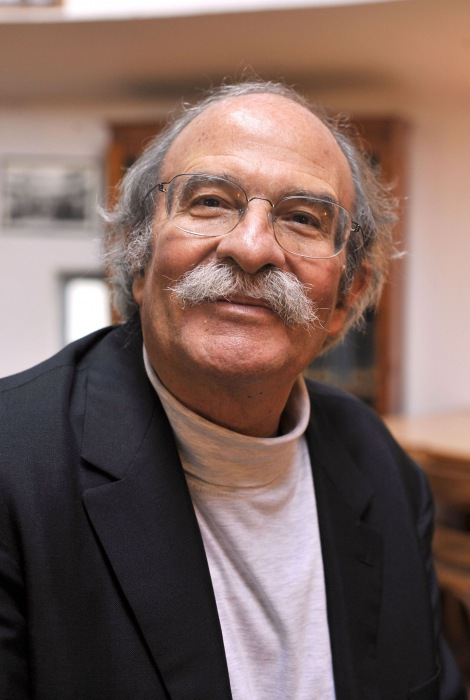
- Profile photo of John H. Seiradakis (2014)
- Born: 5 March 1948; Chania, Greece
- Died: 3 May 2020 (aged 72); Peraia, Greece
- Education: National and Kapodistrian University of Athens; Victoria University of Manchester
- Known for: Pulsars; Galactic Center; Archaeoastronomy; Antikythera Mechanism; Science outreach
- Children: Elena, Michael
- Awards: Alexander von Humboldt Fellowship (1984-1985); Descartes Prize (2005)
- Scientific career
- Fields: Physics, Astronomy
- Workplaces: University of Thessaloniki; Max Planck Institute for Radio Astronomy; University of Hamburg; University of California; Victoria University of Manchester
- Thesis: A low latitude pulsar survey at 408 MHz
- Doctoral advisor: John G. Davies

John Seiradakis (Greek: Ιωάννης-Χιου Σειραδάκης; 5 March 1948 – 3 May 2020) was a Greek astronomer and professor emeritus at the Department of Physics of the Aristotle University of Thessaloniki. He is best known for his contributions in the understanding of radio pulsars, the Galactic Center and archaeoastronomy. Since the early 2000s he was heavily involved in the decoding of the Antikythera mechanism. He was a founding member of the Hellenic Astronomical Society, the European Astronomical Society and the International Olympiad on Astronomy and Astrophysics (IOAA).

== Personal life ==
John Seiradakis was born in Chania, Crete, Greece, on 5 March 1948 to Mercy Burdett Money-Coutts Seiradaki and Michael Seiradakis. His mother was a British archaeologist. He had a younger sister, Sophia Hester Seiradaki. He completed his primary education, as well as two years of high school in Chania. In 1966 his family moved to Athens so he finished the last four grades of high school in Vyronas. He was admitted to the National and Kapodistrian University of Athens, from which he received his Degree in Physics in 1971 (Class of 1970). He continued his post-graduate studies at the Victoria University of Manchester, from which he received his M.Sc. (1973) and his Ph.D. (1975) in Radio Astronomy.

He had two children, Elena, currently an associate professor of biochemistry at Oxford University, and Michael, currently a medical doctor working in Germany.

He died on 3 May 2020 in his house in Peraia, due to complications from cancer. An obituary appeared in Nature Astronomy. On 7 June 2021 the Governing Council of the Hellenic Astronomical Society decided to honour his memory by naming one of the plenary lectures of the biannual conference of the Society to "John H. Seiradakis Plenary Lecture". On 20 October 2024 the 1st Gymnasium of Perea, the town where he lived, was renamed as Gymnasium "John Seiradakis".

== Career ==
John Seiradakis conducted his M.Sc. and Ph.D. projects under the supervision of Dr. John G. Davies. His M.Sc. thesis was entitled "High sensitivity pulsar search." His MSc thesis examiners were Dr. Bryan Anderson and Prof. Antony Hewish. For his Ph.D. project, entitled "Low latitude pulsar survey at 408 MHz", he designed and conducted a sensitive survey for pulsars in the galactic plane. This survey discovered 18 new radio pulsars, more than 20% of the then known population. His PhD viva examiners were Dr. Robin G. Conway and Prof. Bernard E.J. Pagel. After receiving his Ph.D., Seiradakis moved to Germany as a postdoctoral fellow at the Max Planck Institute for Radio Astronomy (MPIfR), working under Prof. Richard Wielebinski. At the MPIfR, he made contributions to the understanding of pulsar emission and helped in the development of the first-generation pulsar instrumentation for the 100-m Effelsberg Radio telescope. He returned to the MPIfR several times during his career; in 1979 as a postdoctoral researcher, from 1982 to 1984 as an Alexander von Humboldt fellow and in 1991 as a visiting researcher on sabbatical leave from the University of Thessaloniki.

In 1978 he became a researcher at the University of Hamburg. Together with Dr. W. Huchtmeier and others, he performed a comprehensive survey of the neutral hydrogen distribution in nearby galaxies using the 100-m radio telescope at Effelsberg.

From 1982 to 1984 he worked as a researcher at the University of California, San Diego, where he continued his research on pulsar emission and interstellar scintillation.

In 1984, together with collaborators A. N. Lasenby, F. Yusef-Zadeh, R. Wielebinski and U. Klein, Seiradakis performed some of the first polarimetric observations of Sag A* at 10 GHz. This study revealed an extended polarised radio source with jet-like lobes originating from the Galactic Center.

In 1986 he joined the Department of Physics of the Aristotle University of Thessaloniki and in 1996 was promoted to Professor. As a faculty member, he contributed in numerous fields, including neutron stars (pulsars), neutral hydrogen modelling in nearby galaxies, the Galactic Center, Flare Stars, Lunar Transient Phenomena and Archaeoastronomy. He published more than 74 scientific papers in refereed journals, and more than 80 papers in conference proceedings and special volumes, as well as three University-level textbooks. He was a founding member of the Hellenic Astronomical Society (Hel.A.S.) where he served as Secretary (1994-1998) and as President (1998-2002). He served as Member (1986-1990) and as Chairman (2001-2005) of the Greek National Committee for Astronomy.

=== Antikythera mechanism ===
The Antikythera mechanism is a hand-powered analogue computer discovered in 1900. The mechanism had been studied extensively for over a century. However, in the early 2000s, a new effort to analyse it using more advanced imaging techniques commenced, the so-called "The Antikythera Mechanism Research Project" (AMRP). Prof. Seiradakis led the Greek involvement in this effort, along with Prof. Xenophon Moussas and Yannis Bitsakis. In 2005 the AMRP was granted permission to study the mechanism using novel tomographic and imaging techniques. This new study resulted in breakthrough discoveries regarding the design, function and origin of the mechanism. The project's findings have been presented in a series of scientific papers and are summarised in a review article in Nature entitled, "Our current knowledge of the Antikythera Mechanism" by J.H. Seiradakis and M.G. Edmunds. They have also inspired a large number of popular science articles and documentaries. Prof. Seiradakis gave numerous lectures and presentations presenting the new results all over the world, including Chicago (USA), Bonn (Germany), CERN (Switzerland), etc.

=== Education and outreach ===
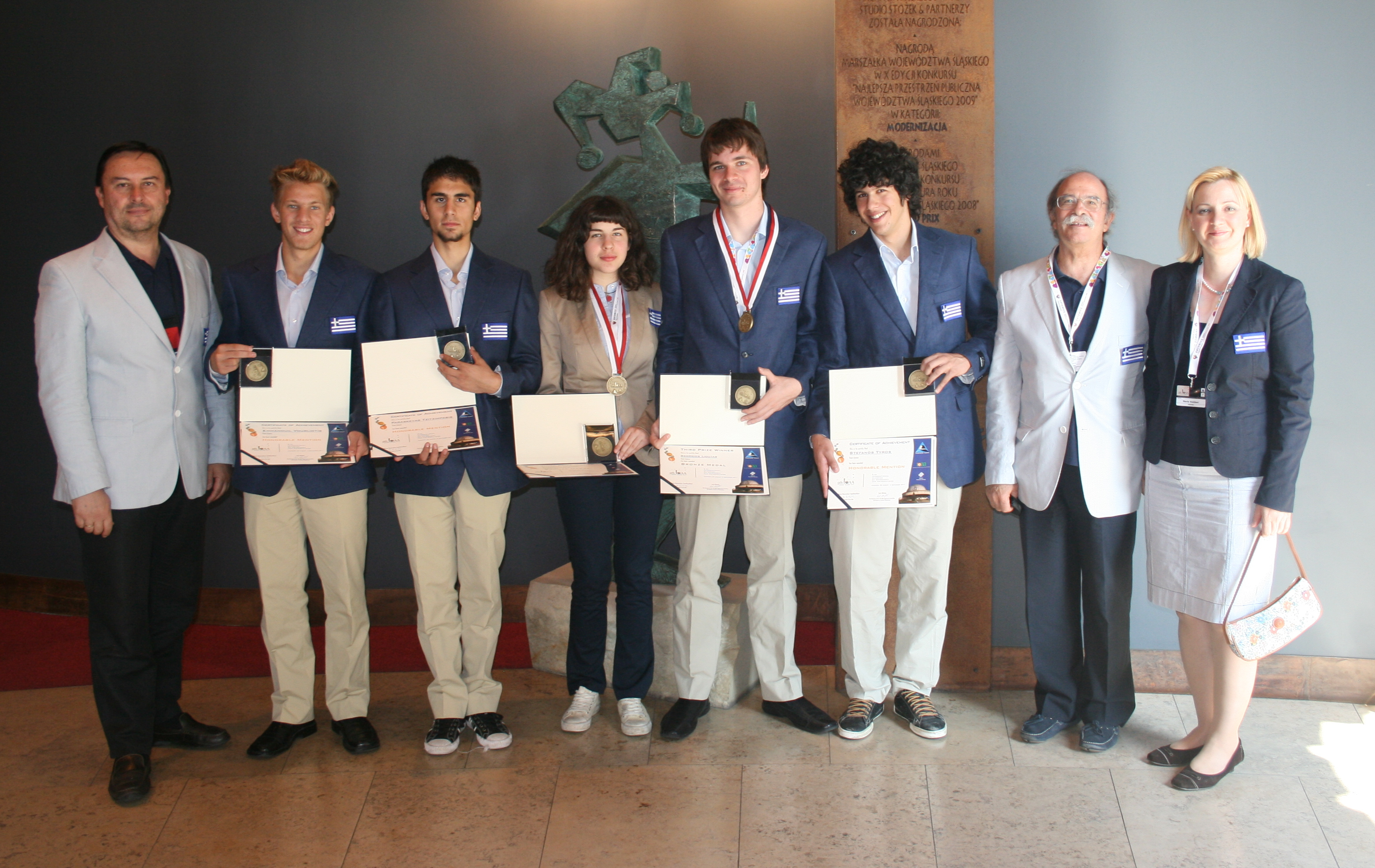
Seiradakis and the greek delegation during the 2011 5th IOAA in Krákow, Poland

Through his teaching and outreach activities, Seiradakis played a central role in the development of astronomy in Greece during the entire period of the Third Hellenic Republic. Dozens of his students have continued their studies at the postgraduate level in astrophysics and went on to assume faculty research positions, both in Greece and abroad.

With the initiative of Prof. Seiradakis, the 2006 General Assembly of the International Astronomical Union established the International Olympiad on Astronomy and Astrophysics, an international competition for high-school students, which is now one of the International Science Olympiads. Seiradakis represented Greece in the IOAA board until his death in 2020. Together with Prof. Loukas Zachilas, he also led the Greek team, from 2007 until 2017.

== Selected publications ==
- "Pulsar Associated with the Supernova Remnant IC 443" by Davies J. G., Lyne A. G. and Seiradakis J. H., Nature, Volume 240, Issue 5378, pp. 229–230 (1972)
- "Direct observation of pulsar microstructure" by Ferguson D. C., Graham D. A., Jones B. B., Seiradakis, J. J. and Wielebinski, R., Nature, Volume 260, Issue 5546, pp. 25–27 (1976)
- "A new symmetrical polarization structure near the galactic centre" by Seiradakis, J. H., Lasenby, A. N., Yusef-Zadeh, F., Wielebinski R. J. and Klein, U., Nature, Volume 317, Issue 6039, pp. 697–699 (1985)
- "Decoding the ancient Greek astronomical calculator known as the Antikythera Mechanism" by Freeth, T., Bitsakis, Y., Moussas, X., Seiradakis, J. H. et al., Nature, Volume 444, Issue 7119, pp. 587–591 (2006)
- "Our current knowledge of the Antikythera Mechanism" by J. H. Seiradakis and M. G. Edmunds, Nature Astronomy, Volume 2, p. 35-42 (2018)
