= Ziakas =

Ziakas Ζιάκας
- Community
- Location within Greece
- Coordinates: 40°1.7′N 21°16.1′E
- Country: Greece
- Administrative region: Western Macedonia
- Regional unit: Grevena
- Municipality: Grevena
- Municipal unit: Theodoros Ziakas

Area
  - Community: 29.711 km^{2} (11.471 sq mi)
- Elevation: 902 m (2,959 ft)

Population (2021)
  - Community: 136
  - Density: 4.58/km^{2} (11.9/sq mi)
- Time zone: UTC+2 (EET)
  - Summer (DST): UTC+3 (EEST)
- Postal code: 511 00
- Area code: +30-2462
- Vehicle registration: PN

Ziakas (Greek: Ζιάκας, before 1927: Τίστα – Tista, between 1940 and 2017: Ζάκας – Zakas) is a village and a community of the Grevena municipality. Before the 2011 local government reform it was a part of the municipality of Theodoros Ziakas, of which it was a municipal district. The 2021 census recorded 136 residents in the community. The community of Ziakas covers an area of 29.711 km^{2}.

== Administrative division ==
The community of Ziakas consists of two separate settlements:

- Perivolaki (population 16 as of 2021)
- Ziakas (population 120)

== Notable people ==
- Thanasis Economou (born 1937), nuclear physicist and NASA researcher.

== See also ==
- List of settlements in the Grevena regional unit
