= Hellenic Astronomical Society =

Astronomical society in Greece

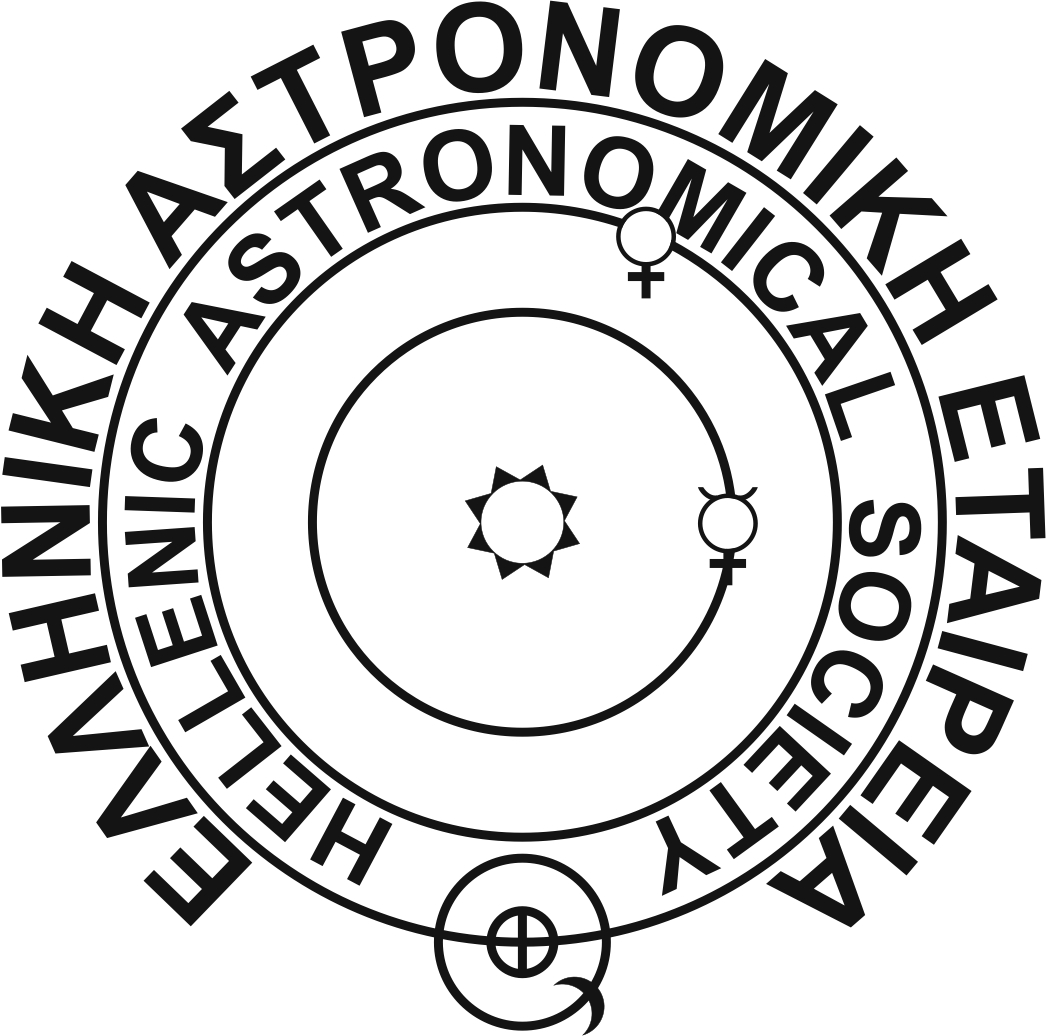
Seal of Hel.A.S.

The Hellenic Astronomical Society (Hel.A.S.), in Greek Ελληνική Αστρονομική Εταιρεία (ΕΛ.ΑΣ.ΕΤ.), is a scientific non profit society of professional astronomers in Greece. Its formal headquarters are at the Dept. of Physics of the University of Athens. The main goal of the Society is to advance the research in astronomy, astrophysics and space physics, as well as to support all educational astronomical activities. As is typical for scientific societies it consists of ordinary members, who have a PhD degree in astrophysics and closely related fields, as well as junior and associate members.

== History ==
Hel.A.S. was formally founded on May 25, 1993. John Hugh Seiradakis, professor of astronomy at the University of Thessaloniki, was the driving force in drafting the constitution of the Society, with the support from Dr. D. Sinachopoulos and Profs. S. Avgoloupis, V. Barbanis, S. Persides, N. Spyrou and H. Varvoglis. The final form of the constitution was presented during the 1st Hellenic Astronomical Conference that took place on 21–23 September 1992 in Athens, and it was supported by 66 founding members. In January 1994 the Society membership rose to 140 and the first elections for the governing council took place on June 2, 1994. Hel.A.S. is also an affiliate of the European Astronomical Society.

Nearly 40% of the members of the Society work outside Greece, including prominent members of the Greek diaspora such as Prof. Yervant Terzian, Prof. Chryssa Kouveliotou and Prof. Vicky Kalogera.

== Officers ==
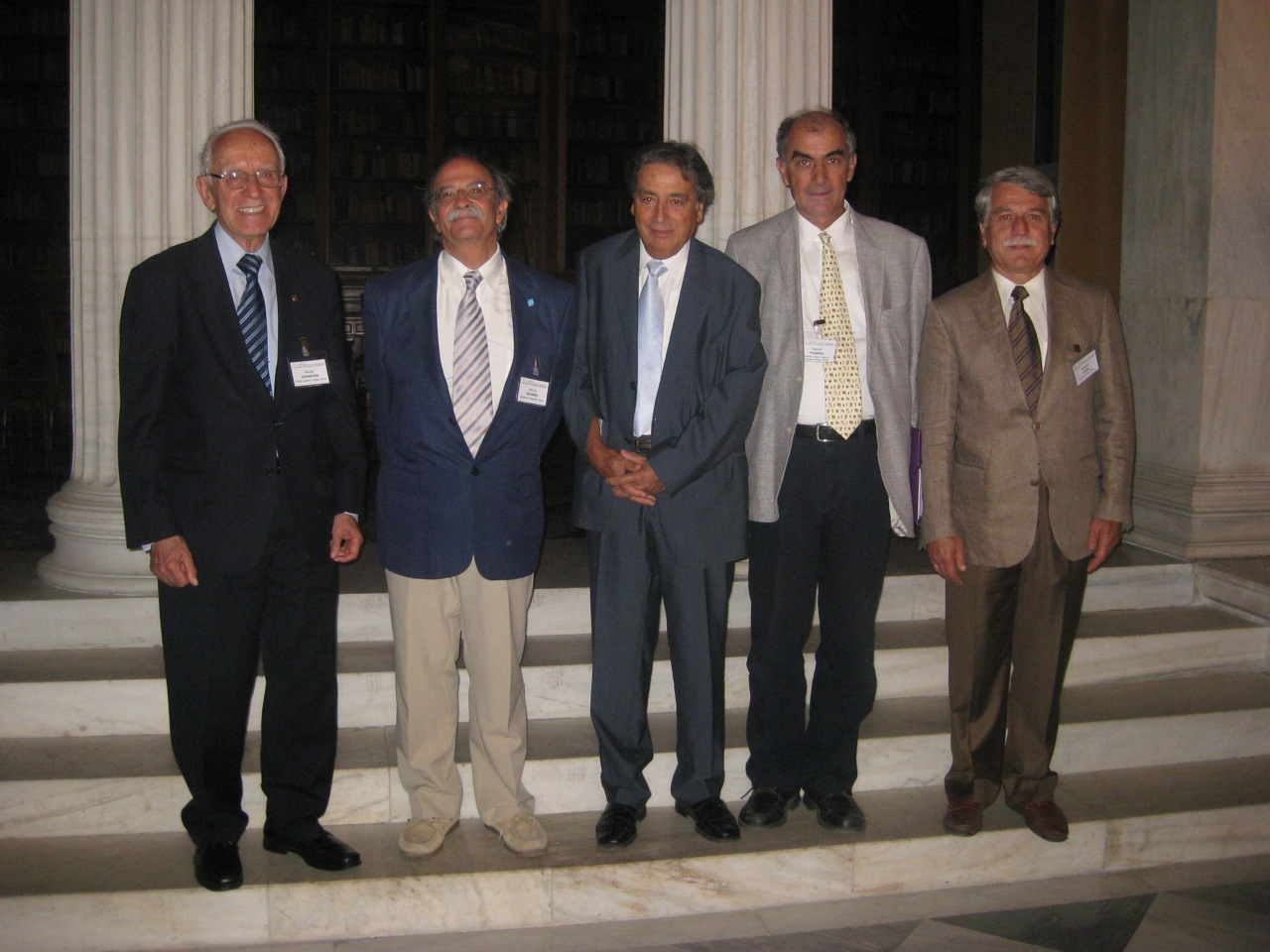
Picture of the first five Presidents of Hel.A.S.

The following University Professors served as Presidents of the Society:

- George Contopoulos (University of Athens), 1994–1996 & 1996–1998
- John Hugh Seiradakis (University of Thessaloniki), 1998–2000 & 2000–2002
- Paul Laskarides (University of Athens), 2002–2004 & 2004–2006
- Kanaris Tsinganos (University of Athens), 2006–2008 & 2008–2010
- Nick Kylafis (Univ. of Crete), 2010–2012 & 2012–2014
- Loukas Vlahos (University of Thessaloniki), 2014–2016
- Apostolos Mastichiadis (University of Athens), 2016–2018 & 2018–2020
- Vassilis Charmandaris (Univ. of Crete), 2020–2024
- Despina Hatzidimitriou (University of Athens), 2024–present

== Publications, conferences and events ==
The Society publishes annually a magazine, "Hipparchos" containing scientific articles and news related to Greek astronomy in English. Since March 1998 it also issues a monthly electronic newsletter, also in English, which is distributed by e-mail to all members and it is also available in the webpage of the Society.

The Society also organises, since its creation, an international astrophysics conference which takes place every two years in different cities of Greece.

On June 7, 2021, the Council of the Society decided to honour the memory of Prof. John H. Seiradakis, a past president of Hel.A.S. who had contributed substantially to the establishment of the Society, by naming one of the plenary lectures of the conference as "John H. Seiradakis Plenary Lecture". The "J.H. Seiradakis" lecturers have been:

- 2021 - Dr. Francisco (Paco) Colomer, JIVE Director (The Netherlands)
- 2023 - Prof. Dr. Michael Kramer, Director Max Planck Institute for Radioastronomy (Germany)
- 2025 - Prof. Dimitrios Psaltis, Georgia Institute of Technology (USA)

A number of public outreach activities are supported by the Society and its members throughout Greece, often is close collaboration with amateur astronomy clubs. A large number of them took place in 2009 to celebrate the Unesco International Year of Astronomy and many others in 2019 on the occasion of the 100 year anniversary of the International Astronomical Union.

== Prizes ==
Hel.A.S. awards every two years the "Best PhD prize of the Society" to a member who has successfully completed their dissertation in astrophysics during the previous 2 years. The person selected is invited to present the results of her/his thesis to the Conference of the Society. The individuals awarded the best PhD prize are the following:

- 2025: Sofia Savvidou (Heidelberg University, Germany)
- 2023: Raphael Skalidis (University of Crete, Greece)
- 2021: Georgios Valogiannis (Cornell University, USA)
- 2019: Georgios Vasilopoulos (MPE and Technical University of Munich, Germany)
- 2017: Ioannis Liodakis (Univ. of Crete, Greece) and Antonios Nathanail (Univ. of Athens, Greece)
- 2015: Maria Petropoulou (Univ. of Athens, Greece)
- 2013: Emmanouil Papastergis (Cornell University, USA)
- 2000: Spyros Basilakos (Univ. of Athens, Greece)
- 1999: Emmanuel Xilouris (Univ. of Athens, Greece)
- 1998: Markos Georganopoulos (Boston University, USA)

In September 2020, the Governing Council of the Society decided to rename the prize to "Best PhD thesis prize - Emilios Harlaftis", in honour of the late astrophysicist and member of the Society, Dr. Emilios Harlaftis.
