= Alpha particle X-ray spectrometer =

Type of spectrometer

APXS is also an abbreviation for APache eXtenSion tool, an extension for Apache web servers.

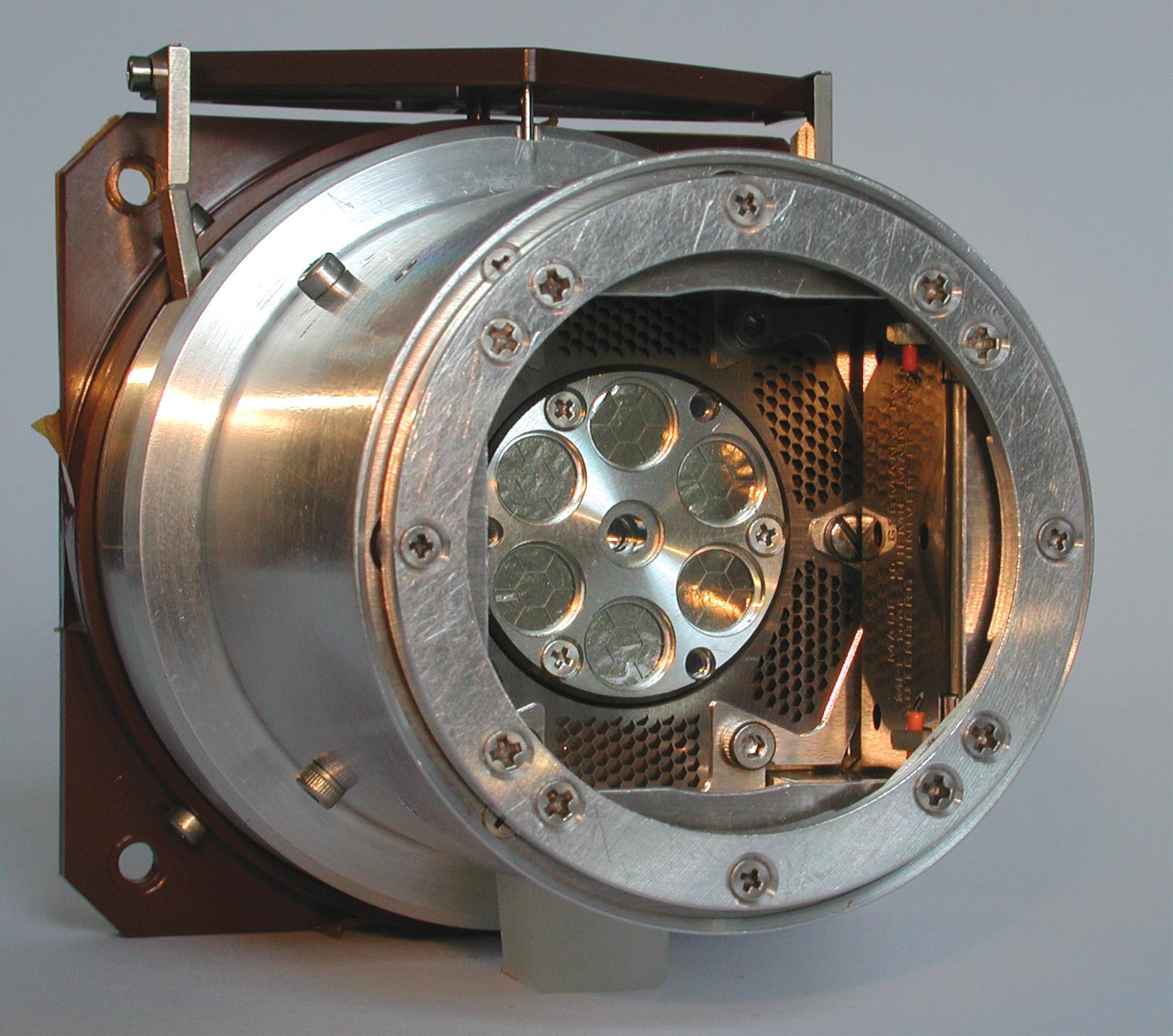
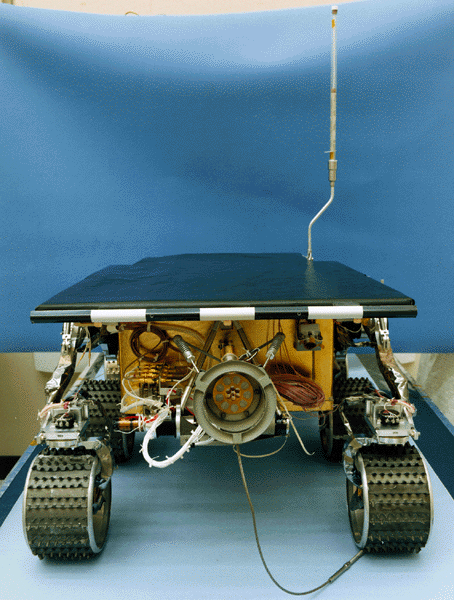
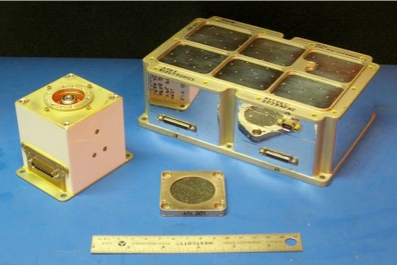
Alpha particle X-ray spectrometer (top left), APXS at the back of the Mars Pathfinder Sojourner rover (top right), MSL Curiosity's alpha particle X-ray spectrometer, with a ruler (bottom).

An alpha particle X-ray spectrometer (APXS) is a spectrometer that analyses the chemical element composition of a sample from scattered alpha particles and fluorescent X-rays after a sample is irradiated with alpha particles and X-rays from radioactive sources. This method of analysing the elemental composition of a sample is most often used on space missions, which require low weight, small size, and minimal power consumption. Other methods (e.g. mass spectrometry) are faster, and do not require the use of radioactive materials, but require larger equipment with greater power requirements. A variation is the alpha proton X-ray spectrometer, such as on the Pathfinder mission, which also detects protons.

Over the years several modified versions of this type of instrument such as APS (without X-ray spectrometer) or APXS have been flown: Surveyor 5-7, Mars Pathfinder, Mars 96, Mars Exploration Rover, Phobos, Mars Science Laboratory, the Philae comet lander and the Chandrayaan-3 lunar rover. APS/APXS devices will be included on several upcoming missions.

HMI controlled automated alpha particle irradiator machine at 9th Bengaluru Space Expo 2026, BIEC

== Sources ==
Several forms of radiation are used in APXS. They include alpha particles, protons, and X-rays. Alpha particles, protons, and X-rays are emitted during the radioactive decay of unstable atoms. A common source of alpha particles is curium-244. It emits particles with an energy of 5.8 MeV. X-rays of 14 and 18 keV are emitted in the decay of plutonium-240. The Mars Exploration Rovers' Athena payload uses curium-244 with a source strength of approximately 30 millicuries (1.1 GBq).

== Alpha particles ==
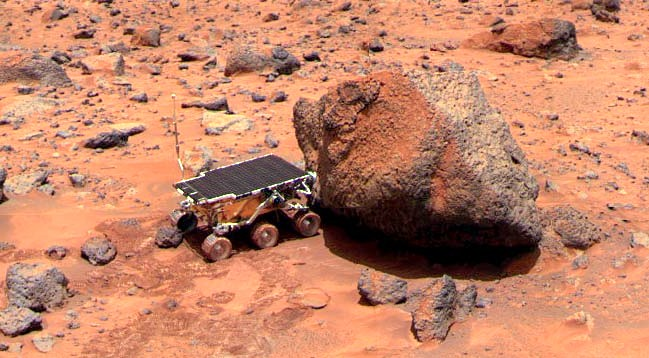
Sojourner takes its APXS measurement of the Yogi Rock.

Some of the alpha particles of a defined energy are backscattered to the detector if they collide with an atomic nucleus. The physical laws for Rutherford backscattering in an angle close to 180° are conservation of energy and conservation of linear momentum. This makes it possible to calculate the mass of the nucleus hit by the alpha particle.

Light elements absorb more energy of the alpha particle, while alpha particles are reflected by heavy nuclei nearly with the same energy. The energy spectrum of the scattered alpha particle shows peaks from 25% up to nearly 100% of the initial alpha particles. This spectrum makes it possible to determine the composition of the sample, especially for the lighter elements. The low backscattering rate makes prolonged irradiation necessary, approximately 10 hours.

== Protons ==
Some of the alpha particles are absorbed by the atomic nuclei. The [alpha,proton] process produces protons of a defined energy which are detected. Sodium, magnesium, silicon, aluminium and sulfur can be detected by this method. This method was only used in the Mars Pathfinder APXS. For the Mars Exploration Rovers the proton detector was replaced by a second alpha particle sensor. So it is also called alpha particle X-ray spectrometer.

== X-ray ==
The alpha particles are also able to eject electrons from the inner shell (K- and L-shell) of an atom. These vacancies are filled by electrons from outer shells, which results in the emission of a characteristic X-ray. This process is termed particle-induced X-ray emission and is relatively easy to detect and has its best sensitivity and resolution for the heavier elements.

== Specific instruments ==
- Alpha-X, for DAS lander on Phobos 1 and Phobos 2.
- ALPHA, for Mars 96 landers. Collaboration between Germany, Russia, and USA.
- Alpha Proton X-Ray Spectrometer, for Mars Pathfinder, developed by the Max Planck Institute and the University of Chicago group including Thanasis Economou.
- Alpha Particle X-ray Spectrometer, for Spirit (MER-A) and Opportunity (MER-B) Mars Exploration Rovers.
- Alpha Particle X-ray Spectrometer, for Curiosity (MSL). The principal investigator for Curiosity's APXS is Ralf Gellert, a physicist at the University of Guelph in Ontario, Canada. It was developed and funded by the Canadian Space Agency, with operations also supported by Guelph and United States' space administration.
- Alpha Particle X-ray Spectrometer, for Philae, the European Space Agency's lander attached to Rosetta, to study the comet 67P/Churyumov–Gerasimenko.

== Gallery ==
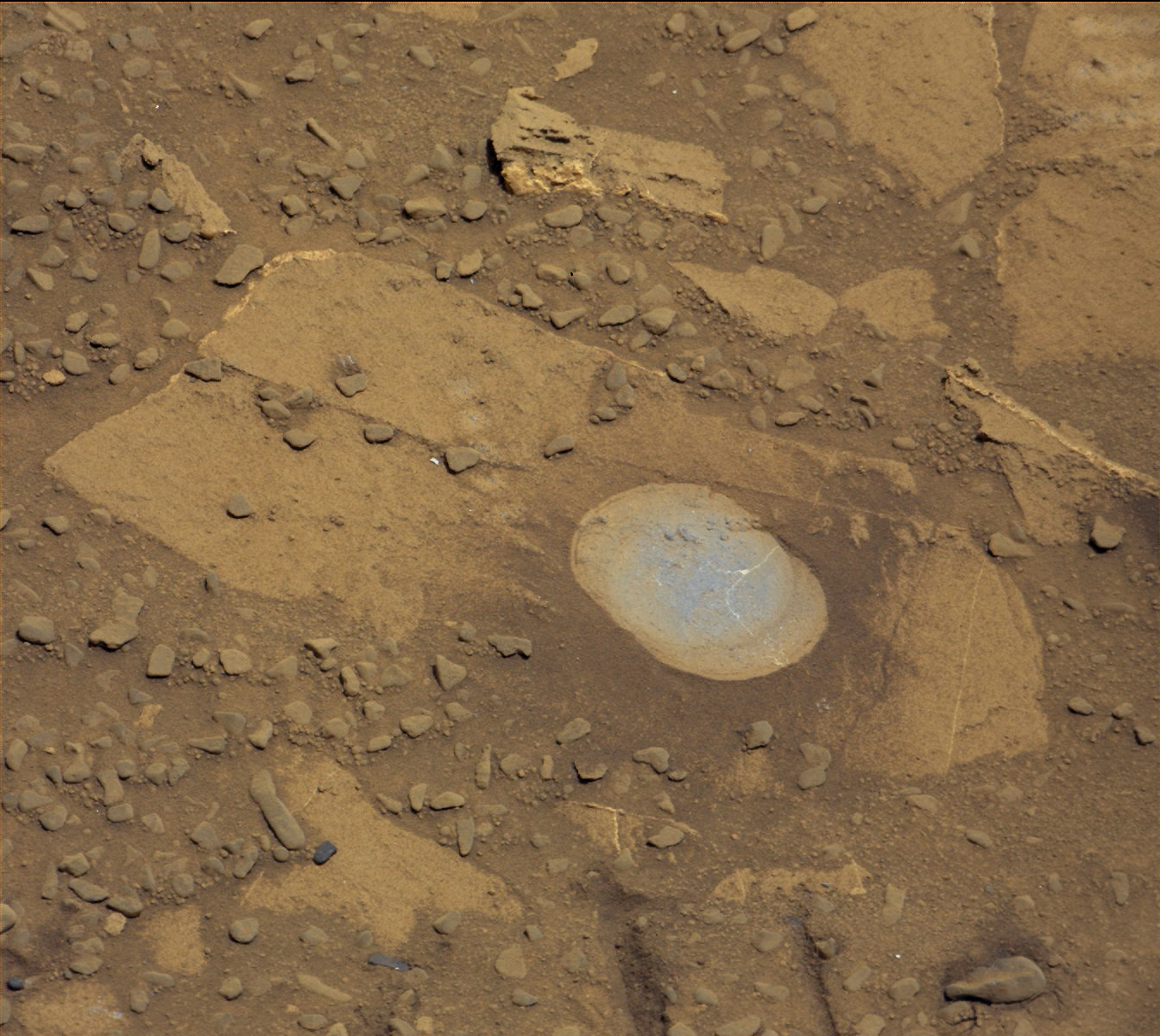
"Bonanza King" rock on Mars – cleaned with "Dust Removal Tool" (17 August 2014).

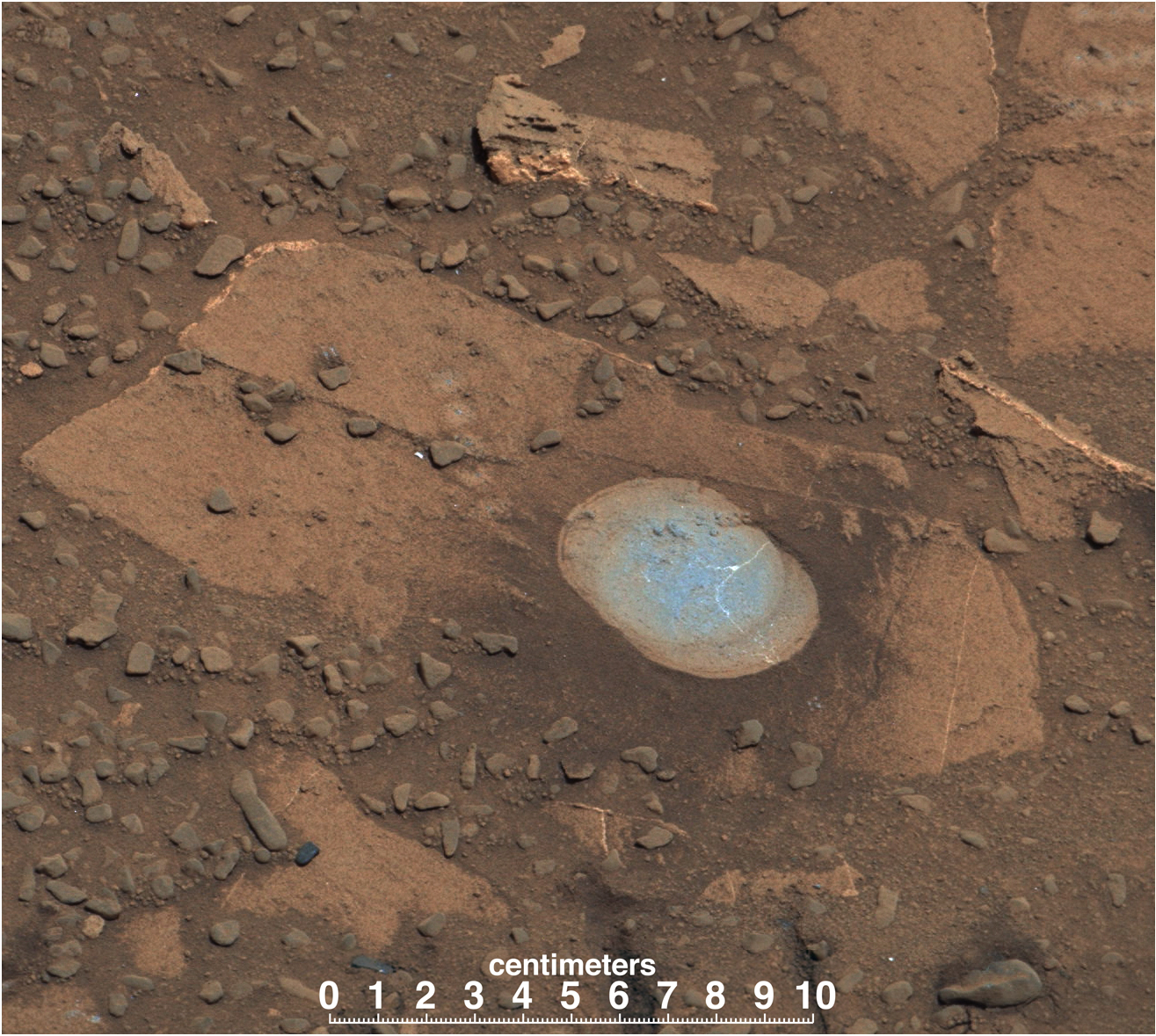
"Bonanza King" rock on Mars – dusted and initially drilled (11 September 2014).

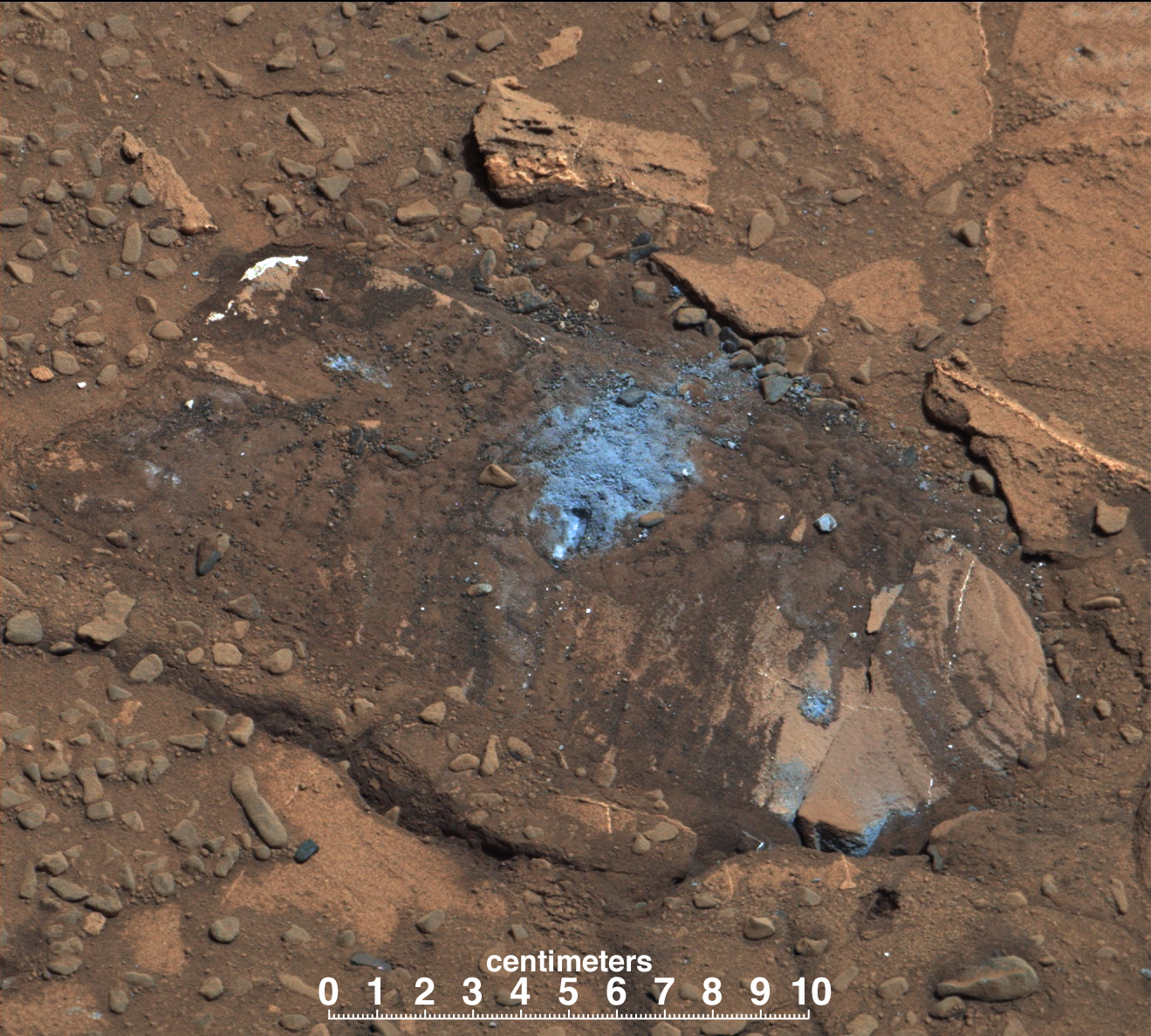
"Bonanza King" rock on Mars – drilling stopped due to loose rock (11 September 2014).

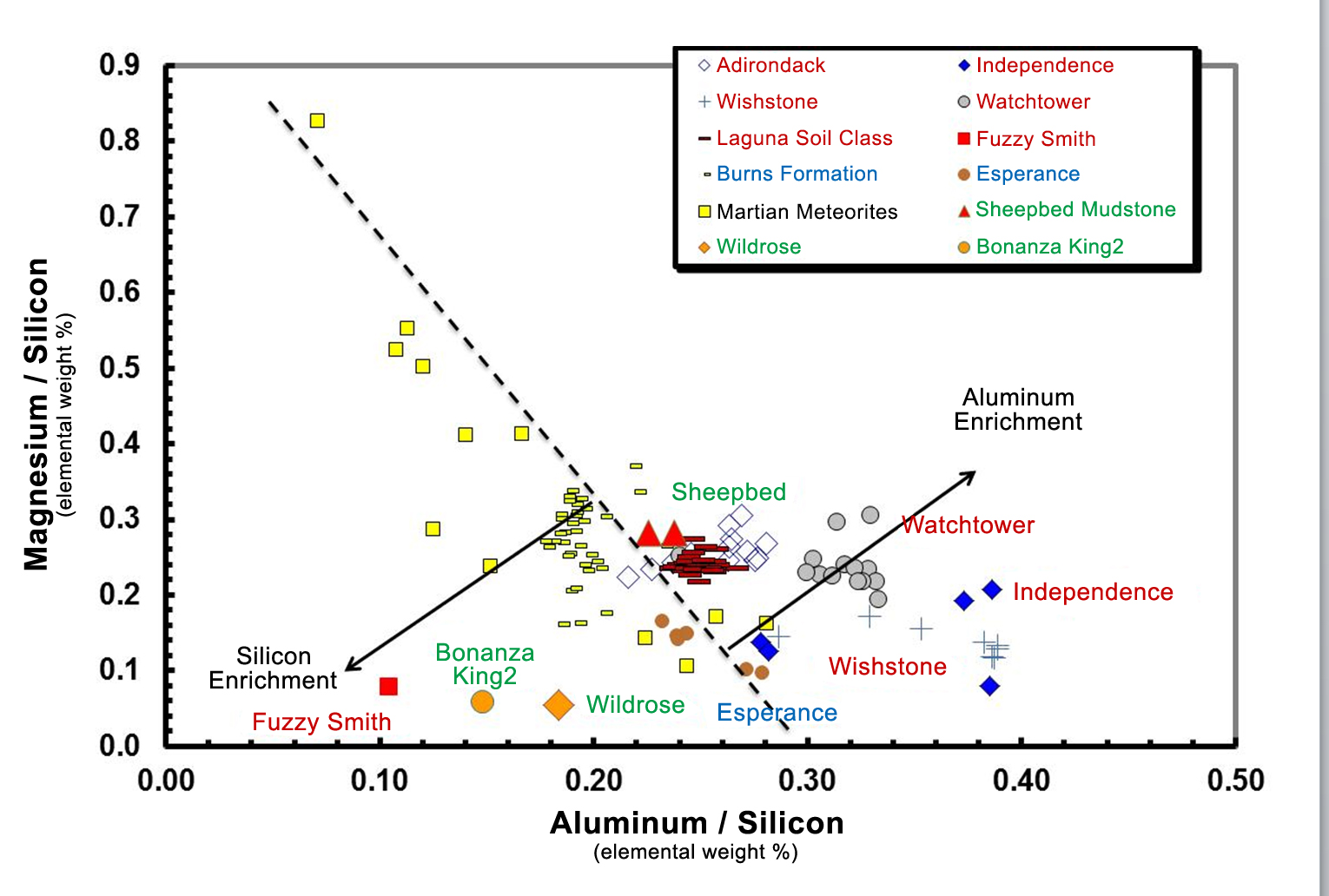
"Bonanza King" rock on Mars – APXS analysis (Curiosity rover; 11 September 2014).
