= Perivolaki, Grevena =

Perivolaki Περιβολάκι
- Settlement
- Location within Greece
- Coordinates: 40°2.1′N 21°13.9′E
- Country: Greece
- Administrative region: Western Macedonia
- Regional unit: Grevena
- Municipality: Grevena
- Municipal unit: Theodoros Ziakas
- Community: Ziakas
- Elevation: 930 m (3,050 ft)

Population (2021)
  - Total: 16
- Time zone: UTC+2 (EET)
  - Summer (DST): UTC+3 (EEST)
- Postal code: 511 00
- Area code: +30-2462
- Vehicle registration: PN

Perivolaki (Greek: Περιβολάκι) is a village of the Grevena municipality. Before the 2011 local government reform it was a part of the municipality of Theodoros Ziakas. The 2021 census recorded 16 residents in the village. Perivolaki is a part of the community of Ziakas.

== See also ==
- List of settlements in the Grevena regional unit
