= Pyrrhus =

Pyrrhus, Pyrrhos or Pyrros (Πύρρος) may refer to:

== People ==
- Pyrrhus of Athens (fl. 5th century BC), Athenian sculptor
- Pyrrhus I of Epirus (318–272 BC), king of Epirus, after whom Pyrrhic victory was named
- Pyrrho of Elis (360–270 BC), Greek philosopher, founder of Pyrrhonism
- Pyrrhus II of Epirus (fl. 3rd century BC), king of Epirus
- Pyrrhus III of Epirus (fl. 3rd century BC), king of Epirus
- Pyrrhus of Constantinople (fl. 7th century AD), Ecumenical Patriarch of Constantinople
- Pyrrhus Ligorius (c. 1512 – 1583), Italian architect and painter
- Dionysios Pyrrhos (1774–1853), Greek monk, doctor and writer
- Pyrrhus Concer (1814–1897), American sailor
- Pyrros Spyromilios (1913–1961), Greek Navy officer
- Pyrros Lappas (1899–1981), Greek Navy officer
- Pyrros Dimas (b. 1971), Greek weightlifter and politician

== Mythology ==
- Neoptolemus, or Pyrrhus, son of Achilles and Deidamia in Greek mythology
- Pyrrhus (mythology), a Phrygian man in Greek mythology

== Other uses ==
- 5283 Pyrrhus, an asteroid
- Pyrrhic, a metric foot of two short unstressed syllables
- Pyrrhus The First, a British-bred Thoroughbred racehorse
- Pyrrhus (Royer), an opera by Joseph-Nicolas-Pancrace Royer
- Ioannina National Airport "King Pyrrhus", an airport in Greece
- Pyrrus, a fictional planet in the Deathworld novels

== See also ==
- Pyrrhic (disambiguation)
- Pyrrhic victory
- Pyrrhonism
- Pyrrhias (disambiguation)
- Pirro (disambiguation)
