= Pyrrhic (disambiguation) =

A pyrrhic is a metrical foot used in formal poetry.

Pyrrhic may also refer to:

- Senses qualifying uses of "victory":
  - Pyrrhic victory, a victory at devastating cost
  - Pyrrhic Victory (album), 2006 album by Intwine
  - Pyrrhic Victories, a short story by Mathilda Malling
- Pyrrhic dance, a coming of age ritual for Korybantes warriors in Ancient Greece
  - Pyrrhichios, an ancient Greek dance described by Xenophon
- Pyrrhic defeat theory, a theory in criminology
- Pyrrhic War (280–275 BC), a series of battles among the Greeks

== See also ==
- Pyrrhus (disambiguation)
- Pyrrha (disambiguation)
- Pyrrhias (disambiguation)
