= Eleftherochori =

Eleftherochori (Greek: Ελευθεροχώρι) is the name of several villages in Greece:

- Eleftherochori, Grevena, a village in Grevena municipality
- Eleftherochori, Ioannina, a village in Dodoni municipality
- Eleftherochori, Kilkis, a village in Kilkis Prefecture
- Eleftherochori, Magnesia, a village in Feres
- Eleftherochori, Pella, a village in Pella municipality
- Eleftherochori, Phthiotis, a village in Lamia municipality
- Eleftherochori, Trikala, a village in Pyli municipality
