= Trikorfo =

Trikorfo (Greek: Τρίκορφο) may refer to the following places in Greece:

- Trikorfo, Aetolia-Acarnania, part of Chalkeia in Aetolia-Acarnania
- Trikorfo, Grevena, part of Kosmas o Aitolos in the Grevena regional unit
- Trikorfo, Messenia, a community in Messenia
- Trikorfo, Phocis, part of Efpalio in Phocis
- Trikorfo, Preveza, part of Parga in the Preveza regional unit
