= Elefthero =

Elefthero may refer to the following places in Greece:

- Elefthero, Grevena, part of the municipality Grevena in the Grevena regional unit
- Elefthero Prosfygon, part of the municipality Grevena in the Grevena regional unit
- Elefthero, Ioannina, part of the municipality Konitsa in the Ioannina regional unit
