= Mesolouri =

Mesolouri Μεσολούρι
- Municipal unit
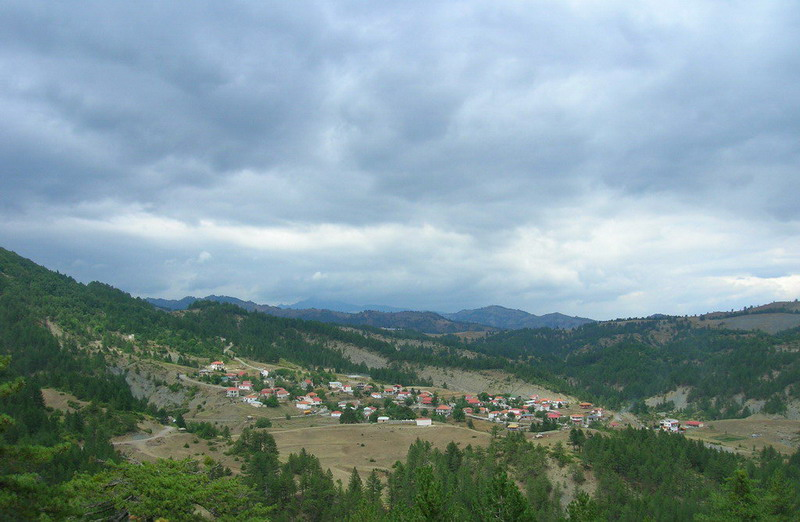
- View of Mesolouri

- Location within the regional unit

- Location within Greece
- Coordinates: 40°06′N 21°09′E
- Country: Greece
- Administrative region: Western Macedonia
- Regional unit: Grevena
- Municipality: Grevena

Area
  - Municipal unit: 17.744 km^{2} (6.851 sq mi)
- Elevation: 1,020 m (3,350 ft)

Population (2021)
  - Municipal unit: 24
  - Municipal unit density: 1.4/km^{2} (3.5/sq mi)
- Time zone: UTC+2 (EET)
  - Summer (DST): UTC+3 (EEST)
- Postal code: 510 32
- Area code: 24620
- Vehicle registration: ΡΝ

Mesolouri (Greek: Μεσολούρι) is a mountain village and a former community in Grevena regional unit, Western Macedonia, Greece. Since the 2011 local government reform it is part of the municipality Grevena, of which it is a municipal unit. Mesolouri had 24 inhabitants as of 2021. The municipal unit has an area of 17.744 km^{2}.

Mesolouri is built on the eastern side of the northern Pindos mountains, in Macedonia, at an altitude of 1080 meters. It administratively belongs to Grevena regional unit and the region of Western Macedonia. Ecclesiastically, Mesolouri belongs to the Holy Metropolis of Grevena. It borders north with the community of Dotsiko, easterly with the municipality of Agios Kosmas, southernly with the community of Filippaioi and the municipality of Theodoros Ziakas and westwards on the community of Samarina. It abstains from Grevena 28 km., from Athens 441 km., from the Thessaloniki 215 km., from Larisa 178 km. and from Ioannina 136 km.

The village is surrounded by a verdurous region, full of trees such as beeches, pines, firs, oaks, maples, junipers and other. The fauna of the area includes animals such as bear, roe deer, wolf, foxes, badgers, squirrels, wild boar, rabbits, and many species of eagles, hawks and other birds.

From the elevations "Petra" (1.326 m), "Tsouka" (1.220 m) and "Krania" (1.237 m) which they are located around the village the view to Kastoria, Grammos, Vintsi, Kissavos and Olympus is fascinating. Between the elevations "Petra" and "Tsouka" exists a small river which shapes three possessed waterfalls of height 3 m, 2.5 m, and 5 m respectively in distance 1 km NW of village. In distance 2 km south of the settlement, in a way that is offered for walk in the forest, are located two small lakes of surface 150 m^{2} and 50 m^{2} and there near the locality "Paliospita" with ruins of old settlement. Northern of the village in distance 1 km is located the church of Prophet Helias and in the 2 km locality "Mauromati" with the homonym fountain. Southernly in distance 1 km from the village is found the locality "Mylos" is found the ruins of old watermills as well as the foundations of bridge. Inside the settlement of worthy attention are the fountain in the central square which is dated by the creation of village and the church of Agios Dimitrios, which was built in 1778 and constitutes the ornament of village.
