= Kydonies =

Kydonies (Greek: Κυδωνιές) may refer to several places in Greece:

- Kydonies, Grevena, a village in the municipal unit Agios Kosmas, Grevena regional unit, Greece
- Nees Kydonies, a village in the municipal unit Loutropoli Thermis, Lesbos, Greece
- the Greek name for the town Ayvalık, Aegean coast, Turkey
- Kydonia, the ancient Greek name of Chania, Crete.
