= John Tasioulas =

Australian legal scholar (born 18 December 1964)

John Tasioulas (born 18 December 1964) is a Greek-Australian moral and legal philosopher.

== Biography ==
John Tasioulas was born in Wollongong, New South Wales, in 1964. His parents, Konstantinos and Elpiniki Tasioulas, migrated to Australia from Dasyllio in the Grevena region of Greece. He was a student at Northcote High School and Melbourne High School. He completed undergraduate degrees in Philosophy and Law at the University of Melbourne and was the 1989 Rhodes Scholar for Victoria. Studying at Balliol College, he received a doctorate (D.Phil in Philosophy) from Oxford University for a thesis on moral relativism which was supervised by Joseph Raz.

Tasioulas was a lecturer in jurisprudence at the University of Glasgow (1992–1998), reader in moral and legal philosophy at the University of Oxford where he was a tutorial fellow in philosophy at Corpus Christi College (1998–2010), Quain Professor of Jurisprudence in the Faculty of Laws, University College London (2011–2014), and the inaugural Yeoh Professor of Politics, Philosophy and Law at The Dickson Poon School of Law, King's College London director of the Yeoh Tiong Lay Centre for Politics, Philosophy, and Law (2014-2020), and Professor of Ethics and Legal Philosophy and director of the Institute for Ethics in AI University of Oxford (2020-2025). He is an honorary professorial fellow at Melbourne Law School, an Emeritus Fellow of Corpus Christi College, Oxford, a distinguished research fellow of the Oxford Uehiro Centre for Practical Ethics, and a member of the Academia Europaea. He has been a fellow at the Radcliffe Institute for Advanced Study at Harvard University and a visiting professor of Law at the University of Chicago Law School. He delivered the 'Or 'Emet Lecture at Osgoode Hall Law School (2011), the Natural Law Lecture at Notre Dame Law School (2012), and the Van Hasselt Lecture at Delft University of Technology (2016).

In September 2025, during the course of a five-month internal investigation into harassment allegations, Tasioulas resigned as director of the Institute for Ethics in AI at the University of Oxford. He denied the allegations in a social media post and said he will pursue legal action.

== Academic expertise ==
Tasioulas works in moral, legal and political philosophy. He has advanced a version of the communicative theory of punishment, according to which the overarching point of punishment is the communication of censure to wrong-doers. His version of the theory is distinctive in making room for the value of mercy alongside that of retributive justice.

In the philosophy of human rights, Tasioulas has argued for an orthodox understanding of such rights, according to which they are moral rights possessed by all human beings simply in virtue of their humanity. This contrasts with a more recent view that characterizes human rights in terms of some political role(s), such as being triggers for international intervention or benchmarks of internal legitimacy. According to Tasioulas, human rights have a foundation both in a plurality of human interests and in equal human dignity. Among other writings in this area, Tasioulas is the author of two reports on minimum core obligations, and their bearing on the human right to health, for the World Bank.

He has written on a range of other topics including moral relativism, games and play, the ethics of robots and artificial intelligence, and the philosophy of international law. His co-edited volume, The Philosophy of International Law (OUP, 2010), is a central text in the field.

== Selected works ==
- ‘In Defence of Relative Normativity: Communitarian Values and the Nicaragua Case’, (1996) 16 Oxford Journal of Legal Studies, pp. 85–128.
- ‘Relativism, Realism and Reflection’, (1998) 41 Inquiry, pp .377–410.
- 'Mercy', (2003) CIII Proceedings of the Aristotelian Society, pp. 101–132.
- 'Punishment and Repentance', Philosophy 81 (2006), pp. 279–322.
- 'Games and the Good', Aristotelian Society Supplementary Volume LXXX (2006), pp. 237–264
- 'The Moral Reality of Human Rights', in T. Pogge (ed.), Freedom from Poverty as a Human Right: Who Owes What to the Very Poor? (OUP, 2007), pp. 75–101.
- S. Besson and J. Tasioulas (eds.), The Philosophy of International Law (OUP, 2010)
- ‘Taking Rights out of Human Rights’, Ethics 120 (July 2010), pp. 647–678.
- 'Towards a Philosophy of Human Rights', Current Legal Problems 65 (2012), pp. 1–30.
- 'Human Rights, Legitimacy, and International Law', American Journal of Jurisprudence 58 (2013), pp. 1–25.
- 'Minimum Core Obligations: Human Rights in the Here and Now', World Bank (2017).
- 'The Minimum Core of the Human Right to Health', World Bank (2017).
- 'First Steps Towards an Ethics of Robots and Artificial Intelligence' Journal of Practical Ethics 7 (2019), pp. 61–95.
