= Leipsi =

Leipsi Λείψι
- Settlement
- Location within Greece
- Coordinates: 40°8.7′N 21°17.3′E
- Country: Greece
- Administrative region: Western Macedonia
- Regional unit: Grevena
- Municipality: Grevena
- Municipal unit: Agios Kosmas
- Community: Kydonies
- Elevation: 840 m (2,760 ft)

Population (2021)
  - Total: 25
- Time zone: UTC+2 (EET)
  - Summer (DST): UTC+3 (EEST)
- Postal code: 511 00
- Area code: +30-2462
- Vehicle registration: PN

Leipsi (Greek: Λείψι) is a village of the Grevena municipality. Before the 2011 local government reform it was a part of the municipality of Agios Kosmas. The 2021 census recorded 25 residents in the village. Leipsi is a part of the community of Kydonies.

== See also ==
- List of settlements in the Grevena regional unit
