= Kalloni, Grevena =

Kalloni Καλλονή
- Community
- Location within Greece
- Coordinates: 40°8.3′N 21°12.1′E
- Country: Greece
- Administrative region: Western Macedonia
- Regional unit: Grevena
- Municipality: Grevena
- Municipal unit: Agios Kosmas

Area
  - Community: 9.447 km^{2} (3.648 sq mi)
- Elevation: 980 m (3,220 ft)

Population (2021)
  - Community: 13
  - Density: 1.4/km^{2} (3.6/sq mi)
- Time zone: UTC+2 (EET)
  - Summer (DST): UTC+3 (EEST)
- Postal code: 511 00
- Area code: +30-2462
- Vehicle registration: PN

Kalloni (Greek: Καλλονή, before 1927: Λούντσι – Lountsi) is a village and a community of the Grevena municipality located within the administrative region of Western Macedonia in northern Greece. It is located some 29 kms northwest of Grevena.

The village is situated at about 980 m above sea level in the eastern foothills of the northernmost section of the Pindus Mountains. The village consists of some 70 odd buildings, built into a steep hillside. It is surrounded by dense oak forests punctuated by sandstone formations. The community of Kalloni covers an area of 9.447 km^{2}.

Kalloni is best known for the traditional stone architecture of its houses and public buildings which mostly date from the late nineteenth and early twentieth century. Kalloni forms part of the network of villages known as "the Mastorohoria" ("the stone masons' villages") which straddle the boundary of the Grevena and Voion municipalities. Kalloni, Pentalofos and Siatista are the only three settlements in these municipalities listed under the 1978 Presidential Decree for the architectural heritage protection of traditional settlements.

== History ==
The settlement was established in 1690 and was officially listed in the archives of the Monastery of Zavorda in 1797. The village was liberated in the Balkan wars in 1912 and renamed to Kalloni in 1927. Its former name was "Lountzi" or "Lountsi".

=== The period 1912 to 1939 ===
Along with most of contemporary northern Greece, the area of Voion and Grevena ceased to be part of the European provinces of the Ottoman Empire as a result of the First Balkan War. The area of Grevena was captured by Greek forces in early October 1912 and was declared to be part of the Greek state.

=== Αdministrative history since 1915 ===
In 1915, after the accession of Western Macedonia into the Greek state, Kalloni was placed in the newly formed Kozani prefecture (Greek: Νομός Κοζάνης). Kalloni and several villages within the Sisani-Siatista diocese were placed within the Grevena subprefecture (Greek: Επαρχία Γρεβενών) of the Kozani prefecture, as it was originally formed, rather than the Voion subprefecture. In some respects, this placement contradicted the village's strong cultural and ecclesiastical ties to the Voion area.

In 1964, the Kozani prefecture was subdivided to create an independent Grevena prefecture with Grevena as its capital. Kalloni remained within the Grevena prefecture. In 1997, as part of the Kapodistria reform, Kalloni and eight other villages were placed in an administrative sub-unit of that prefecture known as the Agios Kosmas municipality which had its administrative seat in the nearby village of Megaro. This reform was short-lived, as both the Agios Kosmas municipality and the Grevena prefecture were abolished in 2010 through the Kallikratis reform.

Kalloni is now part of the Grevena municipality located within the administrative region of Western Macedonia.

== Population ==
Along with other villages in the region, this once populous village experienced severe emigration to urban centres and abroad in the period from 1945 till the early 1970s. The 2021 census recorded just 13 permanent residents in the village.

The population is subject to significant seasonal fluctations, as the village is a popular place for vacations and retirement for many individuals and families descended from the pre-war population.

== See also ==
- List of settlements in the Grevena regional unit
