= 1854 Macedonian rebellion =

Event

1854 Macedonian Rebellion
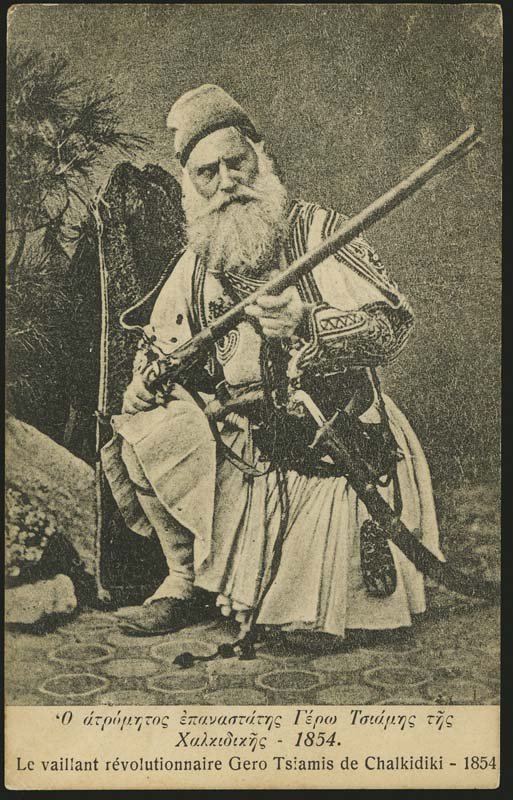
- Dimitrios Karatasos in the year of the rebellion
Date	April – June 1854
Location	Ottoman Macedonia: Sanjak of Salonica; Sanjak of Monastir; Sanjak of Serfiğe
Result	Ottoman victory

Belligerents
Greek Revolutionaries Supported By: (Kingdom of Greece) Greece	Ottoman Empire

Commanders and leaders
Theodoros Ziakas; Dimitrios Karatasos	Abdi Pasha

Strength
2,500+ (peak)	12,000

Casualties and losses
Unknown	Unknown

The Macedonian Rebellion of 1854 (Greek: Μακεδονική επανάσταση του 1854) was a Greek rebellion which took place in 1854 within the context of the Crimean War. The revolt is divided into two phases: the first phase took place in western and southern Macedonia and the second in Chalkidiki. A combination of military defeats and diplomatic pressure from the United Kingdom and France on the government of King Otto resulted in the withdrawal of Greek rebel bands to independent Greece.

== Background ==
King Otto of Greece saw the 1853 outbreak of the Crimean War between the Russian and Ottoman Empires as an opportunity to expand Greek territory at the expense of the Ottomans. He therefore incited rebellions in Greek majority areas of the Ottoman Empire, including Thessaly, Epirus and to a lesser extent Macedonia.

== Revolt ==
In southern Macedonia, the chieftains of Mount Olympos and fighters from independent Greece and Thessaly and Magnesia captured the Vale of Tempe and some parts of Pieria. In May 1854, Greek insurgents under Theodoros Ziakas inflicted a serious defeat on the Ottoman army at Karpero. In Western Macedonia, Ziakas united with rebel bands from Kozani, Siatista and Samarina and took control of the western Pindus and attacked the area of Grevena. After failing to unite with other rebel bands he entrenched his troops in the mountain village of Spilaio. The Ottomans mobilized an army of approximately 12,000 soldiers under Abdi Pasha near Spilaio and another force commanded by Mehmet Tagu at Parorio. At the same time the Ottomans unleashed a wave of reprisals against the Greek civilian population and threatened to kill Metropolite Agapios of Grevena. British and French attempted to convince Ziakas to cease hostilities and engage in talks with the Ottomans, but the latter refused. On 28 May, the Greeks repulsed the initial Ottoman offensive at Houn Havral but were forced to accept foreign diplomatic intervention after being overwhelmed by the numerical superiority of the Ottoman army. Under the terms of the armistice of 31 May, the rebel chieftains left for independent Greece in June 1854.

The second phase took place in Chalkidiki and it was led by Tsamis Karatasos, former adjutant of King Otto. Karatasos had disembarked in Sithonia in April 1854 with 500 irregulars. On 22 of April he launched attacks at an Ottoman encampment in Ormylia, but he faced a counter-attack by 300 bashi-bazouks and his forces retreated. The Ottomans amassed an army of 3,000 men which left Ormylia and marched on the insurgents. In mid-May he fled to Athos and he gathered some volunteers, but was defeated at 28 May and withdrew to Dafni. He also led an attack on Thessaloniki, in which there also was a brief rebellion.

What other time are you awaiting, brother Macedonians? Are we to abide seeing our honour trampled upon, our property seized and our unblemished religion reviled? Is not the blood of our veins Macedonian? Are we not descendants of the glorious king Philip, of Alexander the Great and of Emperor Basil? Let us then take up arms!

— Dimitrios Karatasos, 1854,

== Aftermath ==
After a brief capture of Karyes in Mount Athos, whose monks hadn't supported the rebellion, Karatasos and the other Greek rebels had to return to Athens on the French naval ship SS Solon.

The consuls of the United Kingdom and France took over the protection of both the combatants and the non-combatants who had supported Karatasos from a possible Ottoman invasion of Mount Athos.

== Sources ==
- Vakalopoulos, Konstantinos (2010). Ιστορία του βορείου ελληνισμού Ιστορική εξέλιξη του Μακεδονικού χώρου (1830-1912) [History of Northern Hellenism Historic development of the Macedonian area (1830-1912)] (in Greek). Vol. IV. Stamoulis Ant. ISBN 978-960-6887-29-1.
