= Kyparissi =

Kyparissi may refer to several places in Greece:

- Kyparissi, Grevena, a village near Grevena, West Macedonia
- Kyparissi, Laconia, a village in Laconia (Peloponnese)
- Kyparissi, Phthiotis, a village in Phthiotis
