= Mikro Seirini =

Village in Western Macedonia, Greece

Mikro Seirini Μικρό Σειρήνι
- Settlement
- Location within Greece
- Coordinates: 40°7.8′N 21°25.6′E
- Country: Greece
- Administrative region: Western Macedonia
- Regional unit: Grevena
- Municipality: Grevena
- Municipal unit: Grevena
- Community: Megalo Seirini
- Elevation: 640 m (2,100 ft)

Population (2021)
  - Total: 74
- Time zone: UTC+2 (EET)
  - Summer (DST): UTC+3 (EEST)
- Postal code: 511 00
- Area code: +30-2462
- Vehicle registration: PN

Mikro Seirini (Greek: Μικρό Σειρήνι) is a village in the Western Macedonia region of Greece. Administratively, it is located in the community of Megalo Seirini within the municipality of Grevena, of which it has been a part since 1997. The 2021 census recorded 74 residents in the village.

== See also ==
- List of settlements in the Grevena regional unit
