= Kastro, Grevena =

Kastro Κάστρο
- Settlement
- Location within Greece
- Coordinates: 40°5.5′N 21°18.2′E
- Country: Greece
- Administrative region: Western Macedonia
- Regional unit: Grevena
- Municipality: Grevena
- Municipal unit: Grevena
- Community: Elatos
- Elevation: 820 m (2,690 ft)

Population (2021)
  - Total: 11
- Time zone: UTC+2 (EET)
  - Summer (DST): UTC+3 (EEST)
- Postal code: 511 00
- Area code: +30-2462
- Vehicle registration: PN

Kastro (Greek: Κάστρο) is a village of the Grevena municipality. Before the 1997 local government reform it was a part of the community of Elatos. The 2021 census recorded 11 residents in the village.

Kastro was populated by Greek speaking Muslim Vallahades. The 1920 Greek census recorded 246 people in the village, and 246 inhabitants (15 families) were Muslim in 1923. Following the Greek–Turkish population exchange, Greek refugee families in Kastro were from Pontus (20) in 1926. The 1928 Greek census recorded 72 village inhabitants. In 1928, the refugee families numbered 21 (69 people).

== See also ==
- List of settlements in the Grevena regional unit
