= Felli (disambiguation) =

Felli is a board game.

Felli may also refer to:

- Roger Joseph Felli (1941–1979), Ghanaian politician
- Felli, Grevena, Greek municipality

== See also ==
- DJ Felli Fel (born 1970), American DJ and musician
- Felly (disambiguation)
