= Aidonia (disambiguation) =

Aidonia is a Jamaican reggae musician.

It is also the placename of several villages in Greece:

- Aidonia, Grevena, a village in Grevena
- Aidonia, Corinthia, a village in Corinthia
- Aidonia, Andros, a village in Andros, Greece
