= Amygdalies =

Amygdalies (Greek: Αμυγδαλιές, "almond trees") is the name of two settlements in Greece:

- Amygdalies, Grevena, a village in Grevena
- Amygdalies, Elis, a village in Andritsaina-Krestena
