= Kalirachi, Grevena =

Kalirachi Καληράχη
- Community
- Location within Greece
- Coordinates: 40°4.9′N 21°17.3′E
- Country: Greece
- Administrative region: Western Macedonia
- Regional unit: Grevena
- Municipality: Grevena
- Municipal unit: Agios Kosmas

Area
  - Community: 16.609 km^{2} (6.413 sq mi)
- Elevation: 880 m (2,890 ft)

Population (2021)
  - Community: 95
  - Density: 5.7/km^{2} (15/sq mi)
- Time zone: UTC+2 (EET)
  - Summer (DST): UTC+3 (EEST)
- Postal code: 511 00
- Area code: +30-2462
- Vehicle registration: PN

Kalirachi (Greek: Καληράχη, before 1927: Βραβόνιστα – Vravonista) is a village and a community of the Grevena municipality. Before the 2011 local government reform it was a part of the municipality of Agios Kosmas, of which it was a municipal district. The 2021 census recorded 95 residents in the village. The community of Kalirachi covers an area of 16.609 km^{2}.

== See also ==
- List of settlements in the Grevena regional unit
