= Melissi, Grevena =

Melissi
- Settlement
- Location within Greece
- Coordinates: 39°58′35″N 21°30′3″E
- Country: Greece
- Geographic region: Macedonia
- Administrative region: Western Macedonia
- Regional unit: Grevena
- Municipality: Grevena
- Municipal unit: Grevena
- Community: Agioi Theodoroi
- Time zone: UTC+2 (EET)
  - Summer (DST): UTC+3 (EEST)
- Vehicle registration: ΚΖ

Melissi (Greek: Μελίσσι, before 1927: Πλέσια – Plesia) was a village in Grevena Regional Unit, Macedonia, Greece. It was part of the community of Agioi Theodoroi.

The 1920 Greek census recorded 24 people in the village. Following the Greek–Turkish population exchange, Greek refugee families in Plesia were from Pontus (54) in 1926. The 1928 Greek census recorded 202 village inhabitants. In 1928, the refugee families numbered 54 (183 people). The village was abolished on 9 May 2011.

== See also ==
- List of settlements in the Grevena regional unit
