= Konstantinos Dimidis =

Greek revolutionary, printer and gunsmith

Konstantinos Dimidis (Greek: Κωνσταντίνος Δημίδης; 18th century – 1869) was a fighter of the Greek Revolution of 1821, printer and gunsmith from Grevena.

== Biography ==
=== Early life ===
Konstantinos Dimidis was born in the late 18th century in Grevena. At a young age, He moved to Ayvali searching for employment. There he learned gunsmithing. In 1818 he moved to Paris together with Konstantinos Tompras and they apprenticed typography to Firmin Didot. A year later, returning to Ayvali, together with Tompras they opened a print shop in 1819.

=== In Psara ===
At the start of the Greek Revolution, in June 1821, Ayvali was attacked by the Ottomans. Persecuted, he went to Psara, where he became actively involved in the Revolution. There he founded the first improvised print shop of the revolutionary Greeks. In 1824 Konstantinos Dimidis was printing proclamations and naval diplomas. He even aspired to publish a newspaper, and, for this reason, the British philhellene Leicester Stanhope sent to Psara a lithography equipment. The Destruction of Psara in June 1824 foiled his plans.

=== In Hydra and Nafplio ===
During the period 1827 – 1828 he worked in the print shop of the Italian Giuseppe Chiappe in Hydra, where the newspaper The Friend of the Law was published.

Later, Konstantinos Dimidis went to Nafplio. On his own initiative, collaborating again with Konstantinos Tompras, he founded the first private print shop there. In 1828 he printed two books with the titles "Arithmetic", by Dionysios Pyrrhos, and "Summary of the Gospel", by Neofytos Nikitopoulos. He then cooperated with Emmanouil Antoniadis, with whom he printed the newspapers "Eos" (1830 – 1831) and "Athens" (1832 – 1833). With Antoniadis, Dimidis manufactured and cast type on site.

=== In Ermoupoli and Athens ===
After the departure of Emmanouil Antoniadis to Athens, Konstantinos Dimids decided to move to Syros. In Ermoupoli, he cooperated with Georgios Melistagis and in 1833 they published a newsletter. Until 1836 they had published 10 titles.

In 1836 Konstantinos Dimidis left Syros. In 1843 he took over the newly founded Department of Type Creation of the Royal Type Shop, where he worked until his death, in 1869.

== His contribution ==
His contribution to the evolution of Greek typography and the formation of Greek types was immense, as he was the only Greek in the years of the Revolution, but even up to the 1850, who could produce high quality types.
