= Asprokampos, Grevena =

Asprokampos Ασπρόκαμπος
- Settlement
- Location within Greece
- Coordinates: 40°9′N 21°30.9′E
- Country: Greece
- Administrative region: Western Macedonia
- Regional unit: Grevena
- Municipality: Grevena
- Municipal unit: Grevena
- Community: Myrsina
- Elevation: 590 m (1,940 ft)

Population (2021)
  - Total: 58
- Time zone: UTC+2 (EET)
  - Summer (DST): UTC+3 (EEST)
- Postal code: 511 00
- Area code: +30-2462
- Vehicle registration: PN

Asprokampos (Greek: Ασπρόκαμπος) is a village of the Grevena municipality. Before the 1997 local government reform it was a part of the community of Myrsina. The 2021 census recorded 58 residents in the village. Asprokampos is a part of the local community of Myrsina.

The 1920 Greek census recorded 65 people in the village. Following the Greek–Turkish population exchange, Greek refugee families in Asprokampos were from Pontus (15) in 1926. The 1928 Greek census recorded 121 village inhabitants. In 1928, the refugee families numbered 15 (51 people).

== See also ==
- List of settlements in the Grevena regional unit
