= Georgitsa =

- Settlement
- Location within Greece
- Coordinates: 39°54′36″N 21°24′22″E
- Country: Greece
- Geographic region: Macedonia
- Administrative region: Western Macedonia
- Regional unit: Grevena
- Municipality: Grevena
- Municipal unit: Grevena
- Community: Agioi Theodoroi
- Time zone: UTC+2 (EET)
  - Summer (DST): UTC+3 (EEST)
- Vehicle registration: ΚΖ

Georgitsa (Greek: Γεωργίτσα) was a village in Grevena Regional Unit, Macedonia, Greece. It was part of the community of Agioi Theodoroi.

Georgitsa was inhabited by Aromanians. During the 1960s it became deserted and its population moved to the new village of Agioi Theodoroi, founded by people from Georgitsa and two other nearby villages. Georgitsa was placed under the direct control of the municipality of Grevena in 1997 and later the village was abolished on 9 May 2011.

== See also ==
- List of settlements in the Grevena regional unit
