= Stavros, Grevena =

Stavros Σταυρός
- Settlement
- Location within Greece
- Coordinates: 40°0.9′N 21°19.2′E
- Country: Greece
- Administrative region: Western Macedonia
- Regional unit: Grevena
- Municipality: Grevena
- Municipal unit: Theodoros Ziakas
- Community: Mavranaioi
- Elevation: 750 m (2,460 ft)

Population (2021)
  - Total: 34
- Time zone: UTC+2 (EET)
  - Summer (DST): UTC+3 (EEST)
- Postal code: 511 00
- Area code: +30-2462
- Vehicle registration: PN

Stavros (Greek: Σταυρός, before 1957: Παλαιοχώριον – Palaiochorion) is a village of the Grevena municipality. Before the 2011 local government reform it was a part of the municipality of Theodoros Ziakas. The 2021 census recorded 34 residents in the village. Stavros is a part of the community of Mavranaioi.

== See also ==
- List of settlements in the Grevena regional unit
