= Mavranaioi =

Mavranaioi Μαυραναίοι
- Community
- Location within Greece
- Coordinates: 40°2.1′N 21°20.5′E
- Country: Greece
- Administrative region: Western Macedonia
- Regional unit: Grevena
- Municipality: Grevena
- Municipal unit: Theodoros Ziakas

Area
  - Community: 37.934 km^{2} (14.646 sq mi)
- Elevation: 766 m (2,513 ft)

Population (2021)
  - Community: 223
  - Density: 5.88/km^{2} (15.2/sq mi)
- Time zone: UTC+2 (EET)
  - Summer (DST): UTC+3 (EEST)
- Postal code: 511 00
- Area code: +30-2462
- Vehicle registration: PN

Mavranaioi (Greek: Μαυραναίοι) is a village and a community of the Grevena municipality. Before the 2011 local government reform it was a part of the municipality of Theodoros Ziakas, of which it was a municipal district and the seat. The 2021 census recorded 223 residents in the community. The community of Mavranaioi covers an area of 37.934 km^{2}.

== Administrative division ==
The community of Mavranaioi consists of three separate settlements:

- Mavranaioi (population 106 as of 2021)
- Mavronoros (population 83)
- Stavros (population 34)

== See also ==
- List of settlements in the Grevena regional unit
