= Pyrrhic defeat theory =

Theory in criminology

Pyrrhic defeat theory is the idea that those with the power to change a system benefit from the way it currently works.

== Origin ==
This concept amalgamates ideas from Emile Durkheim, Karl Marx, Kai Erikson and Richard Quinney, drawn together by Jeffrey Reiman in 1979. In criminology, pyrrhic defeat theory is a way of looking at criminal justice policy. It suggests that the criminal justice system's intentions are the very opposite of common expectations; it functions the way it does in order to create a specific image of crime: one in which it is actually a threat from the poor. However, to justify the truth of the idea there must be some substance to back it up. Those with power in the social system need to fight crime only enough to ensure it stays in a prominent position in the public eye, not enough to eliminate it.

A "Pyrrhic victory" is a military victory purchased at such a cost in troops and resources that it amounts to a defeat. The Pyrrhic defeat theory argues that the failure of the criminal justice system yields such benefits to those in positions of power that it amounts to a victory... From the standpoint of those with the power to make criminal justice policy in America, nothing succeeds like failure.

Reiman's ideas differ from those of Marx's slightly. Whereas Marx suggests that the criminal justice system serves the rich by conspicuously repressing the poor, Reiman suggests that it does so instead by its failure to reduce crime. Durkheim suggests that crime is functional for society, and part of the very tapestry that holds it together. He suggests that an act is perceived criminal because it affects a people's opinions:

...we must not say that an action shocks the conscience collective because it is criminal, but rather that it is criminal because it shocks the conscience collective. We do not condemn it because it is a crime, it is a crime because we condemn it.

== See also ==
- Cadmean victory
- Conflict theory
- Just-world fallacy
- Might makes right
- Parkinson's law
- The purpose of a system is what it does
