= Eleftherochori, Grevena =

Village in Greece

Eleftherochori Ελευθεροχώρι
- Settlement
- Grevena, Greece

- Location within Greece
- Coordinates: 40°2.3′N 21°28.9′E
- Country: Greece
- Administrative region: Western Macedonia
- Regional unit: Grevena
- Municipality: Grevena
- Municipal unit: Grevena
- Community: Felli
- Elevation: 610 m (2,000 ft)

Population (2021)
  - Total: 39
- Time zone: UTC+2 (EET)
  - Summer (DST): UTC+3 (EEST)
- Postal code: 511 00
- Area code: +30-2462
- Vehicle registration: PN

Eleftherochori (Greek: Ελευθεροχώρι) is a village of the Grevena municipality. Before the 1997 local government reform it was a part of the community of Felli. The 2021 census recorded 39 residents in the village.

== See also ==
- List of settlements in the Grevena regional unit
