= Smixi =

Smixi Σμίξη Zmixi
- Municipal unit
- Location within the regional unit

- Location within Greece
- Coordinates: 40°3.5′N 21°7.4′E
- Country: Greece
- Administrative region: Western Macedonia
- Regional unit: Grevena
- Municipality: Grevena

Area
  - Municipal unit: 25.292 km^{2} (9.765 sq mi)
- Elevation: 1,220 m (4,000 ft)

Population (2021)
  - Municipal unit: 247
  - Municipal unit density: 9.77/km^{2} (25.3/sq mi)
- Time zone: UTC+2 (EET)
  - Summer (DST): UTC+3 (EEST)
- Postal code: 510 32
- Area code: +30-2462
- Vehicle registration: PN

Smixi (Greek: Σμίξη, Aromanian: Zmixi) is a village and former community in Grevena regional unit, West Macedonia, Greece. Since the 2011 local government reform it is part of the municipality Grevena, of which it is a municipal unit. Smixi had a population of 247 people as of 2021. The municipal unit of Smixi covers an area of 25.292 km^{2}. Smixi is an Aromanian (Vlach) village.

== See also ==
- List of settlements in the Grevena regional unit
