= Doxaras =

Doxaras Δοξαράς
- Settlement
- Location within Greece
- Coordinates: 40°3.81′N 21°23.7′E
- Country: Greece
- Administrative region: Western Macedonia
- Regional unit: Grevena
- Municipality: Grevena
- Municipal unit: Grevena
- Community: Grevena
- Elevation: 570 m (1,870 ft)

Population (2021)
  - Total: 190
- Time zone: UTC+2 (EET)
  - Summer (DST): UTC+3 (EEST)
- Postal code: 511 00
- Area code: +30-2462
- Vehicle registration: PN

Doxaras (Greek: Δοξαράς, before 1927: Μπούρα – Boura), is a village of the Grevena municipality. The 2021 census recorded 190 residents in the village. Doxaras is a part of the community of Grevena.

The 1920 Greek census recorded 66 people in the village. Following the Greek–Turkish population exchange, Greek refugee families in Boura were from Asia Minor (12) in 1926. The 1928 Greek census recorded 154 village inhabitants. In 1928, the refugee families numbered 12 (38 people).

== See also ==
- List of settlements in the Grevena regional unit
