= Kalamitsi, Grevena =

Kalamitsi Καλαμίτσι
- Settlement
- Location within Greece
- Coordinates: 40°5.1′N 21°27.9′E
- Country: Greece
- Administrative region: Western Macedonia
- Regional unit: Grevena
- Municipality: Grevena
- Municipal unit: Grevena
- Community: Grevena
- Elevation: 590 m (1,940 ft)

Population (2021)
  - Total: 32
- Time zone: UTC+2 (EET)
  - Summer (DST): UTC+3 (EEST)
- Postal code: 511 00
- Area code: +30-2462
- Vehicle registration: PN

Kalamitsi (Greek: Καλαμίτσι) is a village of the Grevena municipality. The 2021 census recorded 32 residents in the village. Kalamitsi is a part of the community of Grevena.

The 1920 Greek census recorded 50 people in the village. Following the Greek–Turkish population exchange, Greek refugee families in Kalamitsi were from Pontus (17) in 1926. The 1928 Greek census recorded 146 village inhabitants. In 1928, the refugee families numbered 17 (60 people).

== See also ==
- List of settlements in the Grevena regional unit
