= Elatos, Grevena =

Elatos Έλατος
- Community
- Location within Greece
- Coordinates: 40°4.7′N 21°20.4′E
- Country: Greece
- Administrative region: Western Macedonia
- Regional unit: Grevena
- Municipality: Grevena
- Municipal unit: Grevena

Area
  - Community: 23.305 km^{2} (8.998 sq mi)
- Elevation: 741 m (2,431 ft)

Population (2021)
  - Community: 164
  - Density: 7.04/km^{2} (18.2/sq mi)
- Time zone: UTC+2 (EET)
  - Summer (DST): UTC+3 (EEST)
- Postal code: 511 00
- Area code: +30-2462
- Vehicle registration: PN

Elatos (Greek: Έλατος, before 1927: Δόβρανη – Dovrani) is a village and a community of the Grevena municipality. Before the 2011 local government reform it was a part of the municipality of Grevena, of which it was a municipal district. The 2021 census recorded 164 residents in the community. The community of Elatos covers an area of 23.305 km^{2}.

== Administrative division ==
The community of Elatos consists of two separate settlements:

- Elatos (population 153 as of 2021)
- Kastro (population 11)

== Population ==
Dovrani was a mixed village and a part of its population were Greek speaking Muslim Vallahades. The 1920 Greek census recorded 416 people in the village, and 225 inhabitants (25 families) were Muslim in 1923. Following the Greek–Turkish population exchange, Greek refugee families in Dovrani were from Pontus (55) in 1926. The 1928 Greek census recorded 417 village inhabitants. In 1928, the refugee families numbered 53 (165 people).

Historical population
Year	Pop.	±%
2001	244	—
2011	177	−27.5%
2021	164	−7.3%

== See also ==
- List of settlements in the Grevena regional unit
