= Felly (disambiguation) =

Felly is an American musician.

Felly may also refer to:

- Felly Kilingi, a Congolese-born model known for her work with Technotronic
- Felly, a part of a wooden wheel

== See also ==
- Felli (disambiguation)
