= Myrsina, Grevena =

Village in Greece

Myrsina Μυρσίνα
- Community
- Location within Greece
- Coordinates: 40°7.4′N 21°28.5′E
- Country: Greece
- Administrative region: Western Macedonia
- Regional unit: Grevena
- Municipality: Grevena
- Municipal unit: Grevena

Area
  - Community: 25.494 km^{2} (9.843 sq mi)
- Elevation: 608 m (1,995 ft)

Population (2021)
  - Community: 294
  - Density: 11.5/km^{2} (29.9/sq mi)
- Time zone: UTC+2 (EET)
  - Summer (DST): UTC+3 (EEST)
- Postal code: 511 00
- Area code: +30-2462
- Vehicle registration: PN

Myrsina (Greek: Μυρσίνα, before 1927: Γκομπλάρι – Gkomplari) is a village and a community of the Grevena municipality. Before the 2011 local government reform it was a part of the municipality of Grevena, of which it was a municipal district. The 2021 census recorded 294 residents in the community. The community of Myrsina covers an area of 25.494 km^{2}.

== Administrative division ==
The community of Myrsina consists of two separate settlements:

- Asprokampos (population 58 as of 2021)
- Myrsina (population 236)

== Population ==
Gkomplari was populated by Greek speaking Muslim Vallahades. The 1920 Greek census recorded 385 people in the village, and 385 inhabitants (78 families) were Muslim in 1923. Following the Greek–Turkish population exchange, Greek refugee families in Gkomplari were from East Thrace (1), Asia Minor (28) and Pontus (66) in 1926. The 1928 Greek census recorded 360 village inhabitants. In 1928, the refugee families numbered 95 (354 people).

Historical population
Year	Pop.	±%
2001	377	—
2011	343	−9.0%
2021	294	−14.3%

== See also ==
- List of settlements in the Grevena regional unit
