= Dimitrios Karatasos =

Chieftain during the Greek War of Independence

- Δημήτριος Καρατάσος
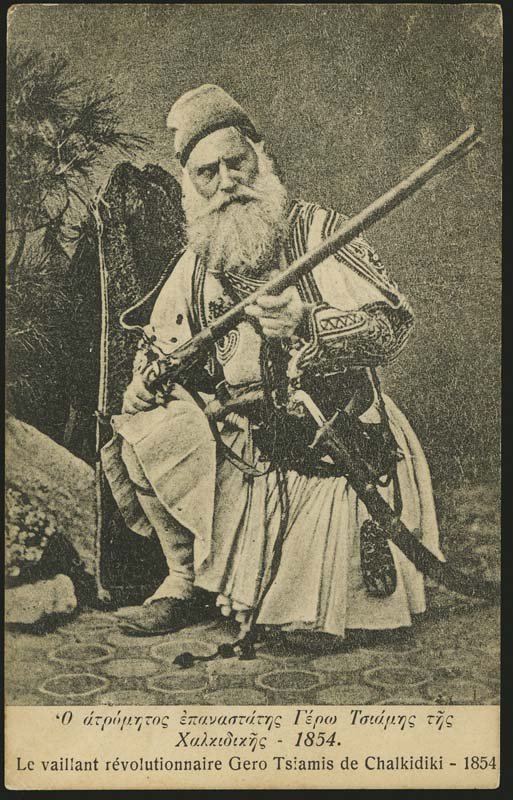
- Dimitrios Karatasos c. 1854
- Born: c. 1798; Dichalevri, Salonika Vilayet, Ottoman Empire (now Greece)
- Died: c. 1861; Belgrade, Principality of Serbia
- Relatives: Anastasios Karatasos (father)
- Military career
- Allegiance: (Greece) First Hellenic Republic; Kingdom of Greece
- Branch: Greek Revolutionary Army
- Nicknames: Yero-Tsamis (Γέρo-Τσάμης); Yero-Karatasos (Γέρo-Καρατάσος)
- Conflicts: Greek War of Independence; 1854 Macedonian rebellion
- Other work: Aide de Camp to King Otto

Dimitrios Karatasos (Greek: Δημήτριος Καρατάσος, 1798–1861), known as Yero-Tsamis (Greek: Γέρo-Τσάμης) or Yero-Karatasos (Greek: Γέρo-Καρατάσος), was a Greek chieftain who participated in the Greek War of Independence and several other rebellions, seeking to liberate his native Greek Macedonia.

== Early life ==
Karatasos was born in the village of Dihalevri in the Imathia region (now Greek Macedonia) in 1798, the son of Anastasios Karatasos who had proclaimed the Greek Revolution in the Naoussa area in 1821. He fought during the Greek War of Independence, alongside his father, first in the Naoussa area and, after the destruction of Naoussa, in Rumeli. In 1828, he was a leading figure in the final phase of the war to rid Rumelia of all Turkish military presence.

== Later life ==
Like his father, Dimitrios was a supporter of a Greek-Serbian Entente in order to relieve the Balkans from the Ottoman occupation. During the period 1844–53 he ventured in the Serbian communities in Trieste and in Skopje in order to find support for a common cause. His assignments were semi-official and one could state that he was a kind of modern-day political agent trying to forge alliances within the realm of secret diplomacy.

After Greek independence, Dimitrios Karatasos continued the struggle to liberate his fellow Greek Macedonians, taking part in an 1854 liberation movement in Chalkidiki. He was one of the prime instigators of the revolt, during which he became known by the epithet Yero (Greek: "γέρο" meaning "elder one"), as Yero-Tsamis or Yero-Karatasos. The insurrections had the support of King Otto of Greece who thought that the liberation of Macedonia and other parts of Greece was possible, hoping on Russian support. The revolt, however, failed in its part having deteriorated the Greco-Turkish relations for the years to come.

Karatasos strongly believed that only a Greek-Serbian agreement could accelerate the process of driving the Ottoman presence from the Balkans. In 1859 he made his claims public by writing articles in a Greek newspaper, whilst cajoled the representatives Serbian community in Greece in order to get support and advice for his goal. The Bavarian-born King Otto was affirmative and promoted Karatasos contacts. Therefore, in 1861 he ventured to Belgrade in order to sign the first official treaty between the two states. During his stay he died from unspecified reasons, presumably from an illness, while planning another uprising.

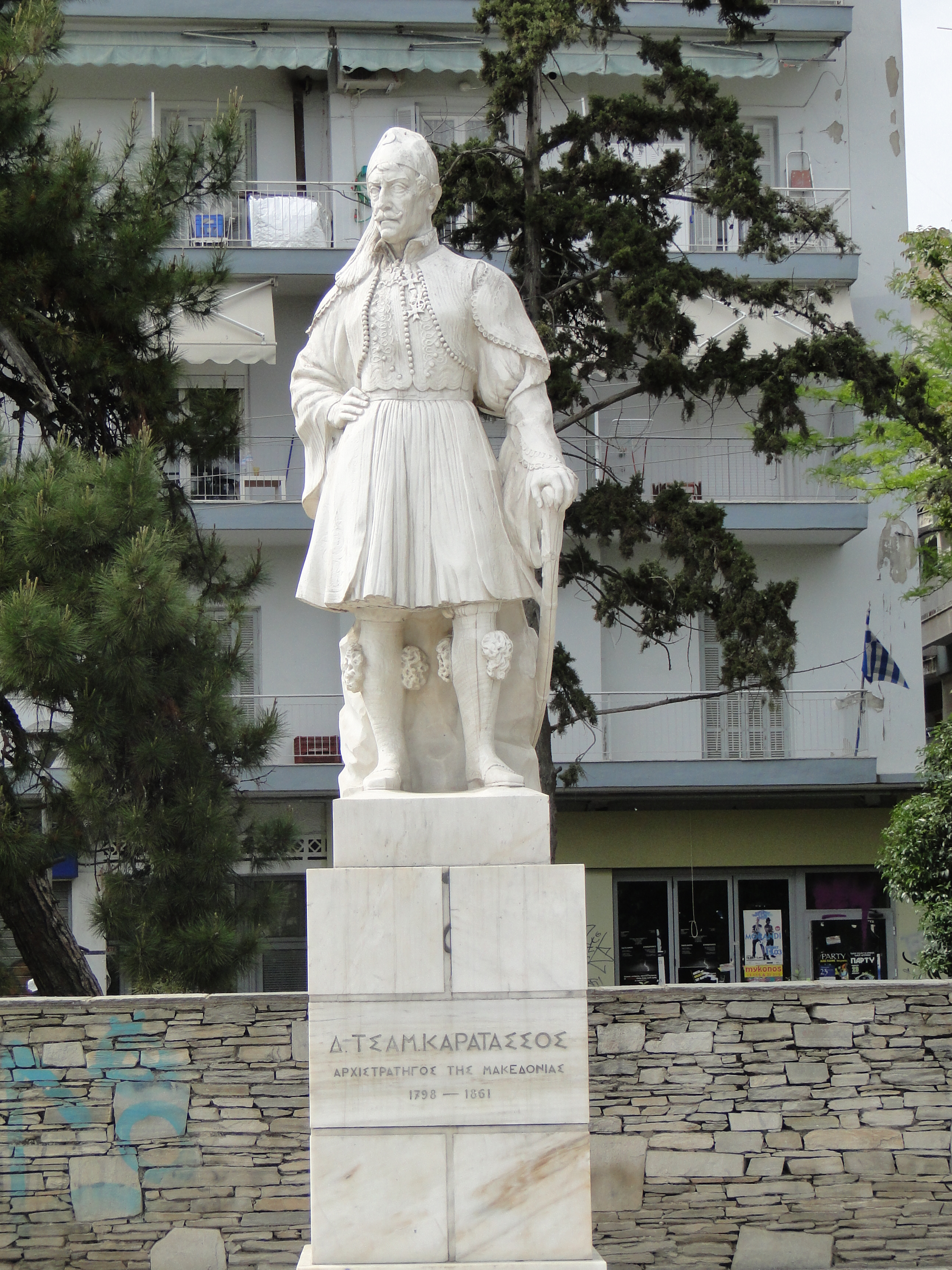
Karatasos' statue in Thessaloniki by sculptor Georgios Dimitriades.

A few months later King Otto was expelled from the country due to a popular uprising.

The first Greek-Serbian alliance was signed in 1867.

== See also ==
- Greek War of Independence
- 1854 Macedonian rebellion
- List of Macedonians (Greek)

== Sources ==
- Institute for Balkan Studies (1976). "Balkan Studies: Biannual Publication of the Institute for Balkan Studies". Balkan Studies. 17. Society for Macedonian Studies: 49–50.
- Douglas Dakin (1973). The Greek Struggle for Independence, 1821-1833. University of California Press. pp. 128–. ISBN 978-0-520-02342-0.
- James J. Reid (2000). Crisis of the Ottoman Empire: Prelude to Collapse 1839-1878. Franz Steiner Verlag. pp. 251–. ISBN 978-3-515-07687-6.
- John Anthony Petropulos (8 December 2015). Politics and Statecraft in the Kingdom of Greece, 1833-1843. Princeton University Press. pp. 331–. ISBN 978-1-4008-7602-0.
