= Aidonia, Grevena =

Aidonia Αηδόνια
- Community
- Location within Greece
- Coordinates: 40°11.6′N 21°19.2′E
- Country: Greece
- Administrative region: Western Macedonia
- Regional unit: Grevena
- Municipality: Grevena
- Municipal unit: Irakleotes

Area
  - Community: 14.703 km^{2} (5.677 sq mi)
- Elevation: 759 m (2,490 ft)

Population (2021)
  - Community: 53
  - Density: 3.6/km^{2} (9.3/sq mi)
- Time zone: UTC+2 (EET)
  - Summer (DST): UTC+3 (EEST)
- Postal code: 511 00
- Area code: +30-2462
- Vehicle registration: PN

Aidonia (Greek: Αηδόνια, before 1927: Στηχάζι – Stichazi) is a village and a community of the Grevena municipality. Before the 2011 local government reform it was a part of the municipality of Irakleotes, of which it was a municipal district. The 2021 census recorded 53 residents in the community. The community of Aidonia covers an area of 14.703 km^{2}.

== Administrative division ==
The community of Kokkinia consists of two separate settlements:

- Aidonia (population 46 as of 2021)
- Dasaki (population 7)

== See also ==
- List of settlements in the Grevena regional unit
