= Mavronoros, Grevena =

Mavronoros Μαυρονόρος
- Settlement
- Location within Greece
- Coordinates: 40°2.9′N 21°20′E
- Country: Greece
- Administrative region: Western Macedonia
- Regional unit: Grevena
- Municipality: Grevena
- Municipal unit: Theodoros Ziakas
- Community: Mavranaioi
- Elevation: 760 m (2,490 ft)

Population (2021)
  - Total: 83
- Time zone: UTC+2 (EET)
  - Summer (DST): UTC+3 (EEST)
- Postal code: 511 00
- Area code: +30-2462
- Vehicle registration: PN

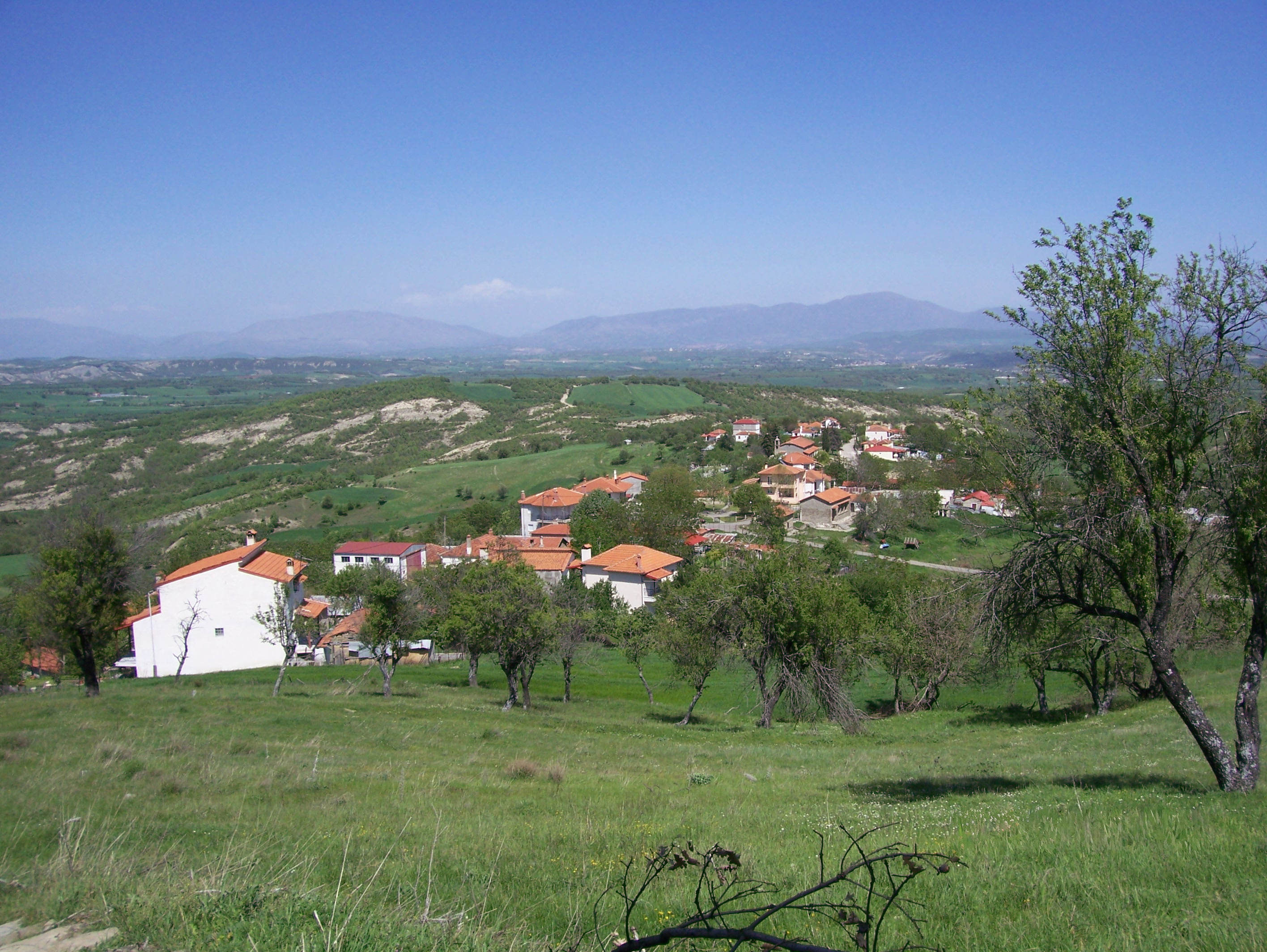

Mavronoros (Greek: Μαυρονόρος) is a village of the Grevena municipality. Before the 2011 local government reform it was a part of the municipality of Theodoros Ziakas. The 2021 census recorded 83 residents in the village. Mavronoros is a part of the community of Mavranaioi.

== See also ==
- List of settlements in the Grevena regional unit
