= Megalo Seirini =

Village in Western Macedonia, Greece

Megalo Seirini Μεγάλο Σειρήνι
- Community
- Location within Greece
- Coordinates: 40°7.1′N 21°24.7′E
- Country: Greece
- Administrative region: Western Macedonia
- Regional unit: Grevena
- Municipality: Grevena
- Municipal unit: Grevena

Area
  - Community: 18.804 km^{2} (7.260 sq mi)
- Elevation: 666 m (2,185 ft)

Population (2021)
  - Community: 405
  - Density: 21.5/km^{2} (55.8/sq mi)
- Time zone: UTC+2 (EET)
  - Summer (DST): UTC+3 (EEST)
- Postal code: 511 00
- Area code: +30-2462
- Vehicle registration: PN

Megalo Seirini (Greek: Μεγάλο Σειρήνι), also known as Mega Seirini (Μέγα Σειρήνι), is a village in the Western Macedonia region of Greece. Administratively, it is a community of the municipality of Grevena, while before the 2011 local government reform it used to be a municipal district. The community of Megalo Seirini covers an area of 18.804 km^{2} and also includes the nearby village of Mikro Seirini. The 2021 census recorded 405 residents in the community, of whom 331 lived in the village of Megalo Seirini.

== Administrative division ==
The community of Megalo Seirini consists of two separate settlements:

- Megalo Seirini (population 331 as of 2021)
- Mikro Seirini (population 74)

== History ==
Megalo Seirini used to be a mixed village and a part of its population was Greek speaking Muslim Vallahades. The 1920 Greek census recorded 444 people in the village, and in 1923, before the Greek–Turkish population exchange, 100 of its inhabitants (18 families) were Muslim. Following the population exchange, the Muslims were transferred to Turkey and 146 Pontic Greeks (41 families) had settled in the village by 1926. This resettlement, combined with 454 native inhabitants, resulted in a total population of 600 at the 1928 census.

== Historical population ==
Historical population
| Year | Pop. | ±% |
|---|---|---|
| 2001 | 701 | — |
| 2011 | 555 | −20.8% |
| 2021 | 405 | −27.0% |

== See also ==
- List of settlements in the Grevena regional unit
