= Dasyllio =

Dasyllio Δασύλλιο
- Community
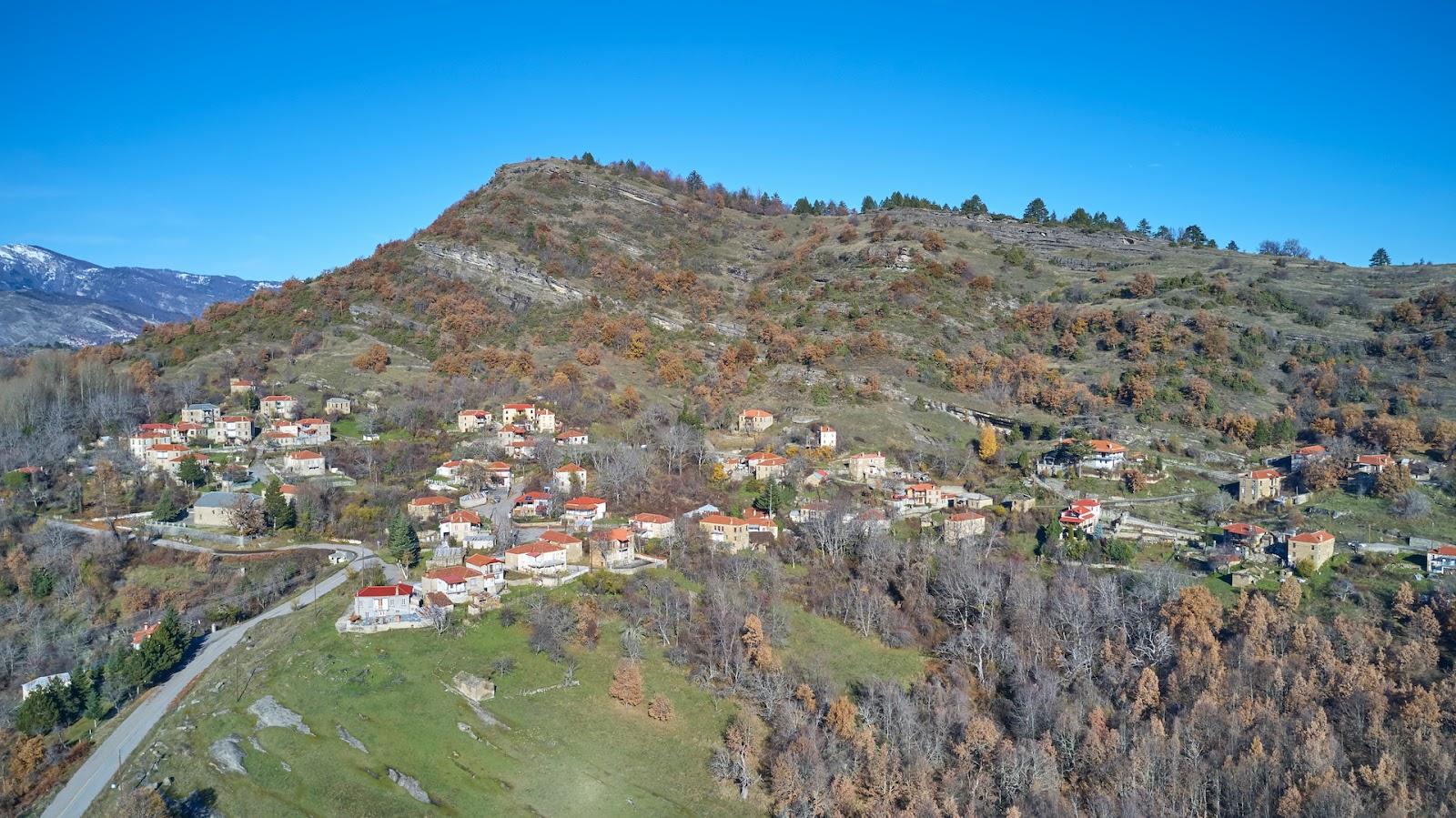
- Dasyllio village

- Location within Greece
- Coordinates: 40°9.9′N 21°10.9′E
- Country: Greece
- Administrative region: Western Macedonia
- Regional unit: Grevena
- Municipality: Grevena
- Municipal unit: Agios Kosmas

Area
  - Community: 7.947 km^{2} (3.068 sq mi)
- Elevation: 1,003 m (3,291 ft)

Population (2021)
  - Community: 20
  - Density: 2.5/km^{2} (6.5/sq mi)
- Time zone: UTC+2 (EET)
  - Summer (DST): UTC+3 (EEST)
- Postal code: 511 00
- Area code: +30-2462
- Vehicle registration: PN
- Website: Dasilio Grevenon

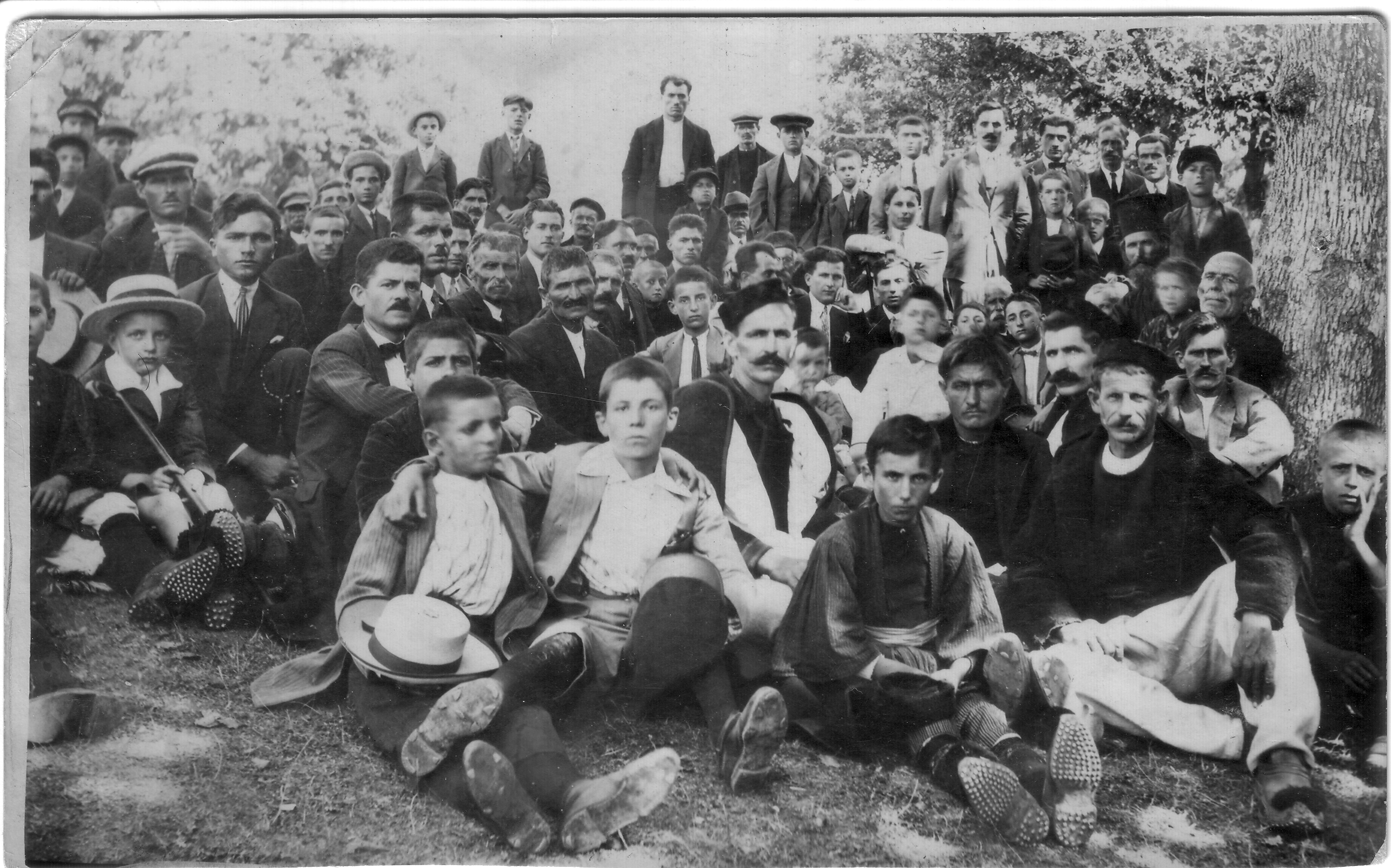
Panigiri, Agia Paraskevi (1930s)

Dasyllio (Greek: Δασύλλιο, before 1927: Μάγερ – Mager) is a village and a community of the Grevena municipality. Before the 2011 local government reform it was a part of the municipality of Agios Kosmas, of which it was a municipal district. The 2021 census recorded 20 residents in the village. The community of Dasyllio covers an area of 7.947 km. Dasyllio is a mountain village in the prefecture of Grevena. It is built at an altitude of 1,000 meters on the slopes of Smolikas.

== See also ==
- List of settlements in the Grevena regional unit
