= Megaro =

Megaro Μέγαρο
- Community
- Location within Greece
- Coordinates: 40°6.8′N 21°15.9′E
- Country: Greece
- Administrative region: Western Macedonia
- Regional unit: Grevena
- Municipality: Grevena
- Municipal unit: Agios Kosmas

Area
  - Community: 24.757 km^{2} (9.559 sq mi)
- Elevation: 950 m (3,120 ft)

Population (2021)
  - Community: 301
  - Density: 12.2/km^{2} (31.5/sq mi)
- Time zone: UTC+2 (EET)
  - Summer (DST): UTC+3 (EEST)
- Postal code: 511 00
- Area code: +30-2462
- Vehicle registration: PN

Megaro (Greek: Μέγαρο, before 1927: Ραδοσίνιστα – Radosinista) is a village and a community of the Grevena municipality. Before the 2011 local government reform it was a part of the municipality of Agios Kosmas, of which it was a municipal district. The 2021 census recorded 301 residents in the village. The community of Megaro covers an area of 24.757 km^{2}. An autobiography was published in 2023 by Christos J. Tsimikas (born August 3, 1935) describing the life and times around Megaro, with historical text describing events starting from 1864.

== See also ==
- List of settlements in the Grevena regional unit
