= Theodoros Ziakas =

Chieftain of the Greek War of Independence

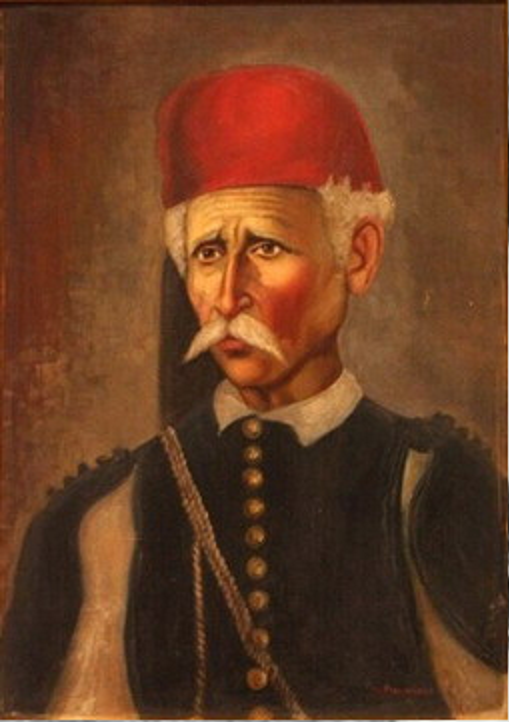
- A portrait of Theodoros Ziakas
- Native name: Θεόδωρος Ζιάκας
- Born: c. 1798; Mavronoros, Monastir Vilayet, Ottoman Empire (now Greece)
- Died: c. 1882; Atalanti, Kingdom of Greece
- Allegiance: (Greece) First Hellenic Republic; Kingdom of Greece
- Battles / wars: Greek War of Independence; 1854 Macedonian rebellion

Theodoros Ziakas (Greek: Θεόδωρος Ζιάκας; Mavronoros, Grevena, 1798 – Atalanti, 1882) was a chieftain in Macedonia during the Greek War of Independence in 1821.

== Biography ==
His family were Armatoloi in Western Macedonia. When the Greek War of Independence broke out, Theodoros and his brother Yiannoulas, who was the successor in the leadership of "Ziakas' Armatoliki", begun the war to the Ottomans and liberated the region of Grevena. In 1826 Mehmet Agha leader of Ottoman military troops attacked and destroyed the headquarters of "Ziakas' Armatoliki" in Grevena. Yannulas Ziakas was killed in that battle, but Theodoros got away in Southern Greece. Two years later, Theodoros Ziakas returned in Grevena region, took over the leadership of "Ziakas' Armatoliki" and established his new headquarters in Pindus mountains (Valia Kalda). He started a new war against the Ottomans until the end of the Greek War of Independence in the Grevena region, and after the establishment of the new First Hellenic Republic he moved in Atalanti.

Theodoros Ziakas was also a chieftain in the Grevena region during the 1854 Macedonian Rebellion

Theodoros Ziakas took the western Pindus, using it as a base from which to raid the Grevena area. However, under pressure from the large Ottoman army and the unpropitious diplomatic circumstances, a truce was negotiated by the consuls of Britain and France. Hostilities ceased in June 1854 and the rebel leaders returned to the Kingdom of Greece.
