= Municipal Museum of Grevena =

Museum in Grevena, Greece

The Municipal Museum of Grevena museum is housed in a recently constructed building next to the Bousios family’s old water mill near the workers’ homes in the city Grevena, Western Macedonia, Greece. It has been operating since 2000 under the auspices of the Grevena Municipal Enterprise. In the museum there are paleontological finds, objects from folk culture and an exhibition of wood-carvings.

To be more precise, conserved and on display are the bones of a 200,000-year-old fossilized elephant (Palaeoloxodon antiquus), found in Ambelia and preserved in excellent condition, as well as parts of a wild ox (Bos primigenius). The folklore exhibits include men’s and women’s traditional dress, farming tools, domestic utensils, objects related to textiles (a loom, pieces of embroidery, woollen coverlets, rag rugs etc.). The wood-carving exhibits are the work of Dimitris Agorastis, with subject matter taken from folklore, religious observance, farming life and contemporary human relations, and were donated to Grevena Municipal Museum by the artist himself.

The museum is planning to put the traditional mill back into operation for educational purposes.

== Sources ==
- The original version of this article was taken from the corresponding article at the Museums of Macedonia website, commissioned by the Macedonian Heritage foundation, written by Vlasis Vlasidis, and published under a CC-BY-SA-3.0 license.
