= Agioi Theodoroi, Grevena =

Agioi Theodoroi Άγιοι Θεόδωροι
- Community
- Location within Greece
- Coordinates: 39°59.1′N 21°30.1′E
- Country: Greece
- Administrative region: Western Macedonia
- Regional unit: Grevena
- Municipality: Grevena
- Municipal unit: Grevena

Area
  - Community: 152.182 km^{2} (58.758 sq mi)
- Elevation: 771 m (2,530 ft)

Population (2021)
  - Community: 254
  - Density: 1.67/km^{2} (4.32/sq mi)
- Time zone: UTC+2 (EET)
  - Summer (DST): UTC+3 (EEST)
- Postal code: 511 00
- Area code: +30-2462
- Vehicle registration: PN

Agioi Theodoroi (Greek: Άγιοι Θεόδωροι) is a village and a community of the Grevena municipality. Before the 2011 local government reform it was a part of the municipality of Grevena, of which it was a municipal district. The 2021 census recorded 254 residents in the community. The community of Agioi Theodoroi covers an area of 152.182 km^{2}.

Agioi Theodoroi was founded by inhabitants from the villages of Diakos, Georgitsa and Melissi. The village was built near the main Grevena–Trikala road. In the 1981 census Agioi Theodoroi was listed as a separate new village. In the early twenty–first century, it has experienced extensive population decline.

== Administrative division ==
The community of Agioi Theodoroi consists of four separate settlements:

- Agioi Theodoroi (population 160 as of 2021)
- Aimilianos (population 30)
- Anthrakia (population 51)
- Despotis (population 13)

Former villages:

- Georgitsa
- Melissi

== Population ==
Historical population
| Year | Pop. | ±% |
|---|---|---|
| 2001 | 470 | — |
| 2011 | 369 | −21.5% |
| 2021 | 254 | −31.2% |

== See also ==
- List of settlements in the Grevena regional unit
