= Trikorfo, Grevena =

Trikorfo Τρίκορφο
- Community
- Location within Greece
- Coordinates: 40°8.9′N 21°12.6′E
- Country: Greece
- Administrative region: Western Macedonia
- Regional unit: Grevena
- Municipality: Grevena
- Municipal unit: Agios Kosmas

Area
  - Community: 3.724 km^{2} (1.438 sq mi)
- Elevation: 980 m (3,220 ft)

Population (2021)
  - Community: 16
  - Density: 4.3/km^{2} (11/sq mi)
- Time zone: UTC+2 (EET)
  - Summer (DST): UTC+3 (EEST)
- Postal code: 511 00
- Area code: +30-2462
- Vehicle registration: PN

Trikorfo (Greek: Τρίκορφο, before 1927: Τριτσικό – Tritsiko) is a village and a community of the Grevena municipality. Before the 2011 local government reform it was a part of the municipality of Agios Kosmas, of which it was a municipal district. The 2021 census recorded 16 residents in the village. The community of Trikorfo covers an area of 3.724 km^{2}.

== See also ==
- List of settlements in the Grevena regional unit
