= Kydonies, Grevena =

Kydonies Κυδωνιές
- Community
- Location within Greece
- Coordinates: 40°10.3′N 21°17′E
- Country: Greece
- Administrative region: Western Macedonia
- Regional unit: Grevena
- Municipality: Grevena
- Municipal unit: Agios Kosmas

Area
  - Community: 18.829 km^{2} (7.270 sq mi)
- Elevation: 885 m (2,904 ft)

Population (2021)
  - Community: 74
  - Density: 3.9/km^{2} (10/sq mi)
- Time zone: UTC+2 (EET)
  - Summer (DST): UTC+3 (EEST)
- Postal code: 511 00
- Area code: +30-2462
- Vehicle registration: PN

Kydonies (Greek: Κυδωνιές, before 1927: Βαντσικό – Vantsiko) is a village and a community of the Grevena municipality. Before the 2011 local government reform it was a part of the municipality of Agios Kosmas, of which it was a municipal district. The 2021 census recorded 74 residents in the community. The community of Kydonies covers an area of 18.829 km^{2}.

== Administrative division ==
The community of Kydonies consists of two separate settlements:

- Kydonies (population 49 as of 2021)
- Leipsi (population 25)

== See also ==
- List of settlements in the Grevena regional unit
