= Elefthero Prosfygon =

Elefthero Prosfygon Ελεύθερο Προσφύγων
- Settlement
- Location within Greece
- Coordinates: 40°9.1′N 21°26.2′E
- Country: Greece
- Administrative region: Western Macedonia
- Regional unit: Grevena
- Municipality: Grevena
- Municipal unit: Grevena
- Community: Elefthero
- Elevation: 660 m (2,170 ft)

Population (2021)
  - Total: 134
- Time zone: UTC+2 (EET)
  - Summer (DST): UTC+3 (EEST)
- Postal code: 511 00
- Area code: +30-2462
- Vehicle registration: PN

Elefthero Prosfygon (Greek: Ελεύθερο Προσφύγων) is a village of the Grevena municipality. Before the 1997 local government reform it was a part of the community of Elefthero. The 2021 census recorded 134 residents in the village.

== See also ==
- List of settlements in the Grevena regional unit
