= Kyparissi, Grevena =

Kyparissi Κυπαρίσσι
- Community
- Location within Greece
- Coordinates: 40°8.2′N 21°13.6′E
- Country: Greece
- Administrative region: Western Macedonia
- Regional unit: Grevena
- Municipality: Grevena
- Municipal unit: Agios Kosmas

Area
  - Community: 8.372 km^{2} (3.232 sq mi)
- Elevation: 940 m (3,080 ft)

Population (2021)
  - Community: 31
  - Density: 3.7/km^{2} (9.6/sq mi)
- Time zone: UTC+2 (EET)
  - Summer (DST): UTC+3 (EEST)
- Postal code: 511 00
- Area code: +30-2462
- Vehicle registration: PN

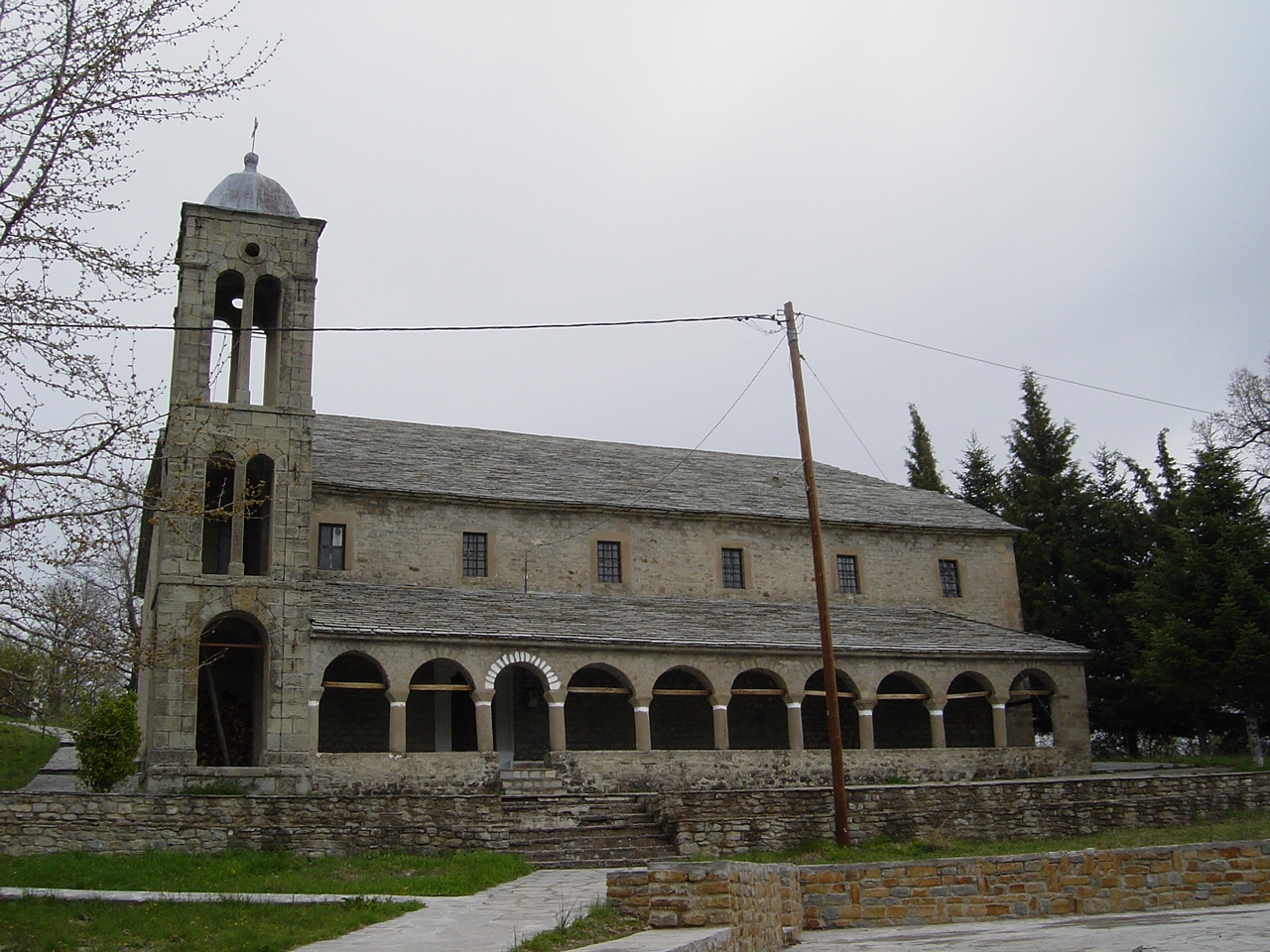
The Church of St. George in the Greven village of Kiparisi (Bishovo)

Kyparissi (Greek: Κυπαρίσσι, before 1927: Μπίσοβο – Bisovo, between 1927 and 1928: Δύσβατο – Dysvato) is a village and a community of the Grevena municipality. Before the 2011 local government reform it was a part of the municipality of Agios Kosmas, of which it was a municipal district. The 2021 census recorded 31 residents in the village. The community of Kyparissi covers an area of 8.372 km^{2}.

== See also ==
- List of settlements in the Grevena regional unit
