= Cadmean victory =

Victory involving one's own ruin

A Cadmean victory (Greek: καδμεία νίκη, romanized: kadmeía níkē) is a victory involving one's own ruin.

The term references Cadmus (Greek: Καδμός), the legendary founder of Thebes in Boeotia and the mythic bringer of script to Greece. On seeking to establish the city, Cadmus required water from a spring guarded by a water-dragon similar to the Lernaean Hydra. He sent his companions to slay the dragon, but they all perished. Although Cadmus eventually proved victorious, the victory cost the lives of those who were to benefit from the new settlement.

== In classic literature ==
In the Histories, Herodotus refers to a Cadmean victory: "In the engagement that followed, the Phocaeans were victorious, but their success was only a sort of Cadmeian victory."

== See also ==
- Pyrrhic victory
