= Elefthero, Grevena =

Elefthero Ελεύθερο
- Community
- Location within Greece
- Coordinates: 40°9.1′N 21°25.2′E
- Country: Greece
- Administrative region: Western Macedonia
- Regional unit: Grevena
- Municipality: Grevena
- Municipal unit: Grevena

Area
  - Community: 11.177 km^{2} (4.315 sq mi)
- Elevation: 670 m (2,200 ft)

Population (2021)
  - Community: 169
  - Density: 15.1/km^{2} (39.2/sq mi)
- Time zone: UTC+2 (EET)
  - Summer (DST): UTC+3 (EEST)
- Postal code: 511 00
- Area code: +30-2462
- Vehicle registration: PN

Elefthero (Greek: Ελεύθερο, before 1927: Κοντσικιότι – Kontsikioti) is a village and a community of the Grevena municipality. Before the 2011 local government reform it was a part of the municipality of Grevena, of which it was a municipal district. The 2021 census recorded 169 residents in the community. The community of Elefthero covers an area of 11.177 km^{2}.

== Administrative division ==
The community of Elefthero consists of two separate settlements:

- Elefthero (population 35 as of 2021)
- Elefthero Prosfygon (population 134)

== Population ==
The 1920 Greek census recorded 132 people in the village. Following the Greek–Turkish population exchange, Greek refugee families in Kontsikioti were from Pontus (90) in 1926. The 1928 Greek census recorded 442 village inhabitants. In 1928, the refugee families numbered 90 (307 people).

Historical population
Year	Pop.	±%
2001	234	—
2011	229	−2.1%
2021	169	−26.2%

== See also ==
- List of settlements in the Grevena regional unit
