= Felli, Grevena =

Felli Φελλί
- Community
- Location within Greece
- Coordinates: 40°1.4′N 21°32′E
- Country: Greece
- Administrative region: Western Macedonia
- Regional unit: Grevena
- Municipality: Grevena
- Municipal unit: Grevena

Area
  - Community: 57.857 km^{2} (22.339 sq mi)
- Elevation: 626 m (2,054 ft)

Population (2021)
  - Community: 799
  - Density: 13.8/km^{2} (35.8/sq mi)
- Time zone: UTC+2 (EET)
  - Summer (DST): UTC+3 (EEST)
- Postal code: 511 00
- Area code: +30-2462
- Vehicle registration: PN

Felli (Greek: Φελλί, before 1949: Φιλί – Fili) is a village and a community of the Grevena municipality. Before the 2011 local government reform, it was a part of the municipality of Grevena, of which it was a municipal district. The 2021 census recorded 799 residents in the community. The community of Felli covers an area of 57.857 km^{2}.

== Administrative division ==
The community of Felli consists of two separate settlements:

- Eleftherochori (population 39 as of 2021)
- Felli (population 760)

== Population ==
The 1920 Greek census recorded 155 people in the village. Following the Greek–Turkish population exchange, Greek refugee families in Fili were from Asia Minor (20) in 1926. The 1928 Greek census recorded 488 village inhabitants. In 1928, the refugee families numbered 22 (73 people).

Historical population
Year	Pop.	±%
2001	347	—
2011	1,094	+215.3%
2021	799	−27.0%

== See also ==
- List of settlements in the Grevena regional unit
