= Amygdalies, Grevena =

Village in Western Macedonia, Greece

Amygdalies Αμυγδαλιές
- Community
- Location within Greece
- Coordinates: 40°9.3′N 21°22.4′E
- Country: Greece
- Administrative region: Western Macedonia
- Regional unit: Grevena
- Municipality: Grevena
- Municipal unit: Grevena

Area
  - Community: 28.331 km^{2} (10.939 sq mi)
- Elevation: 840 m (2,760 ft)

Population (2021)
  - Community: 358
  - Density: 12.6/km^{2} (32.7/sq mi)
- Time zone: UTC+2 (EET)
  - Summer (DST): UTC+3 (EEST)
- Postal code: 511 00
- Area code: +30-2462
- Vehicle registration: PN

Amygdalies (Greek: Αμυγδαλιές, before 1919: Πρεβενίτσα – Prevenitsa, between 1919 and 1927: Πικριβενίτσα – Pikrivenitsa) is a village in the Western Macedonia region of Greece. Administratively, it is a community of the municipality of Grevena, in the Grevena regional unit, while before the 2011 local government reform it used to be a municipal district. The community of Amygdalies covers an area of 28.331 km^{2} and has a population of 358 according to the 2021 census.

== Administrative division ==
The community of Amygdalies consists of three separate settlements:

- Agia Triada (population 31 as of 2021)
- Amygdalies (population 307)
- Lochmi (population 20)

== Historical population ==
Historical population
Year	Pop.	±%
2001	736	—
2011	500	−32.1%
2021	358	−28.4%

== See also ==
- List of settlements in the Grevena regional unit
