= Pyrrhus of Athens =

Ancient Greek sculptor

Pyrrhus was an Athenian sculptor of 5th century BC. He is mentioned in the list of Pliny as the maker of bronze statues of Hygieia and Athena. In 1840, a base was found in the Acropolis of Athens, bearing the following inscription

ΑΘΕΝΑΙΟΙΤΕΙΑΘΕΝΑΙΑΙΤΕΙΥΓΙΕΙΑΙ ΠΥΡΡΟΣΕΠΟΙΗΣΕΝΑΘΕΝΑΙΟΣ

The Athenians to Athena and Hygeia. Pyrrhus the Athenian made it.
