= Dionysios Pyrrhos =

Greek monk, doctor, writer and publisher

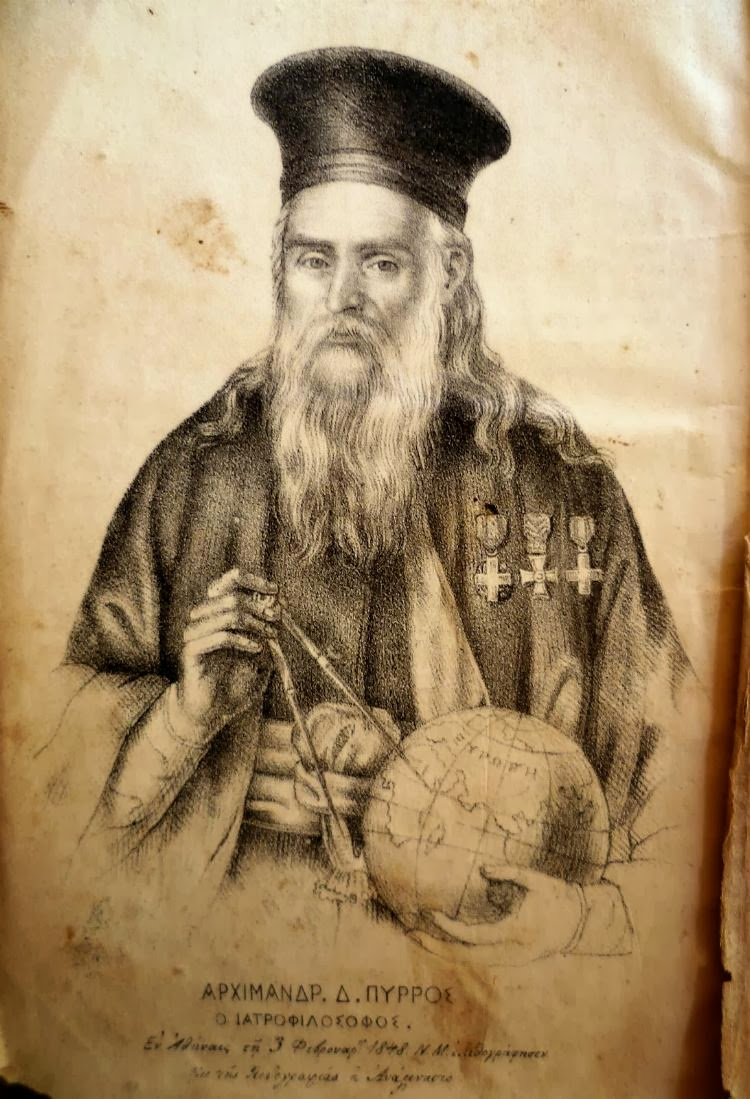
Dionysios Pyrrhos in 1848

Dionysios Pyrrhos the Thessalian (Greek: Διονύσιος Πύρρος ο Θετταλός; 1774 or 1777, Kastania, Trikala – 12 February 1853, Athens), was a monk, doctor, writer and publisher.

== Biography ==
Dionysios Pyrrhos was a monk from Thessaly. He studied in Tyrnavos and Kydonies under Ioannis Pezaros and Benjamin of Lesbos. He then studied medicine in Italy, and when he returned he taught philosophy and sciences in Athens. After the Greek War of Independence he returned to Athens again devoting himself to writing and practicing medicine. Apart from writing he also created maps and earth and celestial sphere globes. He also attempted to create a paper mill, but he failed. He set up a lithography place in Athens. He estimated the amount of the books he had printed to be about 25,000 volumes, covering a range of subjects: medicine, geography, history, morality, grammar. He died on 13 February 1853.

== Sources ==
- Yanis Kordatos, History of Modern Greece, Volume 12.
- Konstantinos Dimaras, "Dionysios Pyrrhos", in: K. Th. Dimaras, Composite I From education to literature, (edit. Alexis Politis), Seminary of New Hellenism, Athens, 2000, pp. 154–155
