= Pyrrhias =

Pyrrhias (Πυρῥίας) or Pyrrias (Πυρρίας) may refer to:

== Ancient Greece ==
- Pyrrhias of Aetolia, general, late 3rd century BC.
- Pyrrhias, Aetolian winner in stadion race, Ancient Olympic Games (200 BC)
- Pyrrhias, a slave character in the comedy Dyskolos by Menander
- Pyrrhias, a ferryman of Ithaca in Plutarch's Moralia

== Zoology ==
- Benthonellania pyrrhias of Rissoidae (Gastropoda)
- Nystiella pyrrhias of Epitoniidae (Wentletrap)
- Iophanus pyrrhias of Iophanus, Lycaenidae (butterfly)
- Augochlora pyrrhias of Halictidae (Hymenoptera)
