= Pyrrhic victory =

Victory at a cost tantamount to defeat

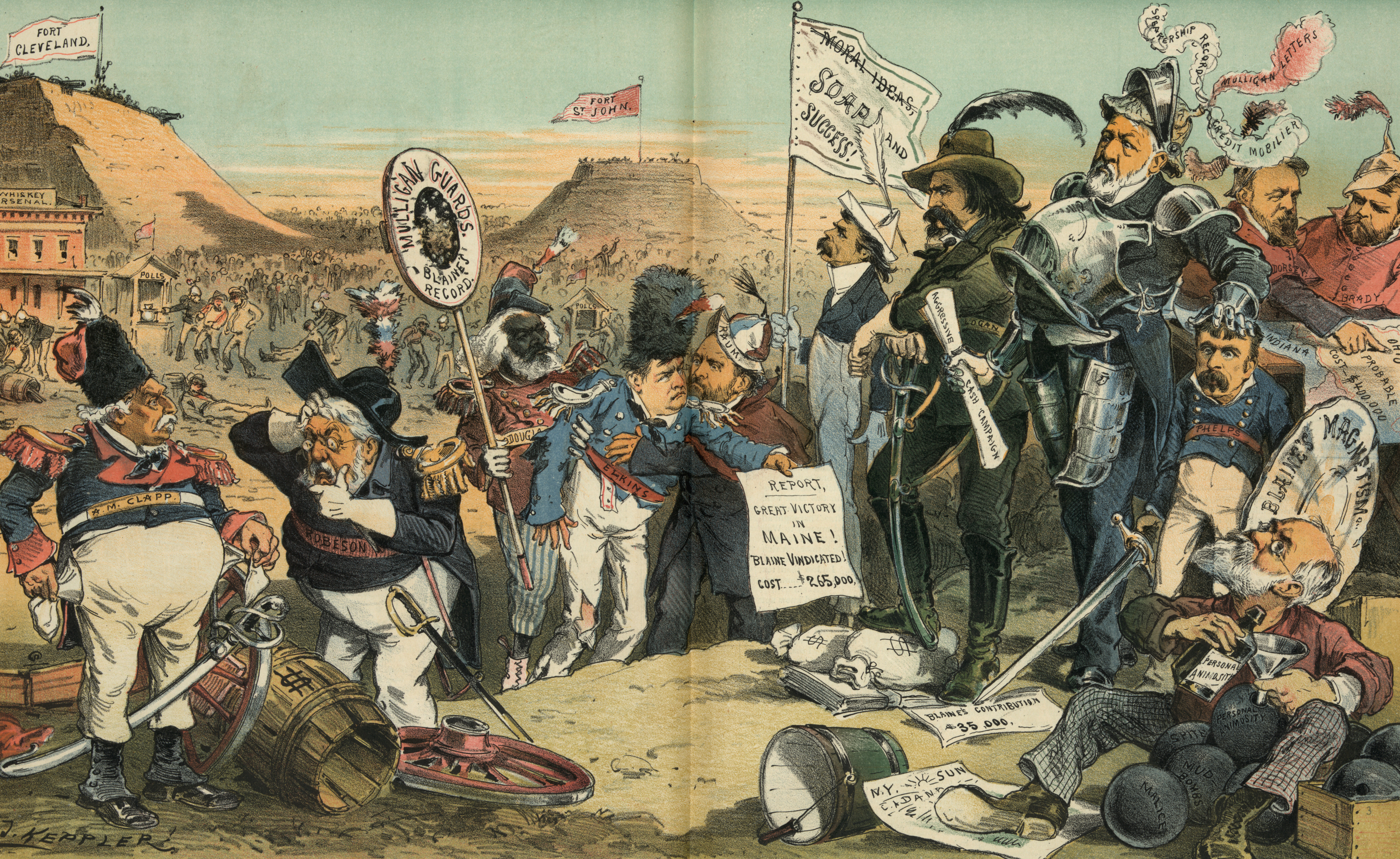
Cartoon satirizing James G. Blaine's campaign in 1884 by noting his party's victory in Maine's early gubernatorial election. This was traditionally seen as a bellwether for future presidential victory but had come at great financial cost: "Another victory like this and our money's gone!"

A Pyrrhic victory (/ˈpɪrɪk/ PIRR-ik) is a victory gained at such a cost to the victor that it is tantamount to defeat.

The phrase references a statement attributed to Pyrrhus of Epirus. After his victory against the Romans in the Battle of Asculum in 279 BC, Plutarch reports that Pyrrhus exclaimed "If we are victorious in one more battle with the Romans, then we shall be utterly ruined!"

== Etymology ==
A "Pyrrhic victory" is named after King Pyrrhus of Epirus, whose army suffered irreplaceable casualties in defeating the Romans at the Battle of Heraclea in 280 BC and the Battle of Asculum in 279 BC, during the Pyrrhic War. After the latter battle, Plutarch relates in a report by Dionysius:

The armies separated; and, it is said, Pyrrhus replied to one that gave him joy of his victory that one other such victory would utterly undo him. For he had lost a great part of the forces he brought with him, and almost all his particular friends and principal commanders; there were no others there to make recruits, and he found the confederates in Italy backward. On the other hand, as from a fountain continually flowing out of the city, the Roman camp was quickly and plentifully filled up with fresh men, not at all abating in courage for the loss they sustained, but even from their very anger gaining new force and resolution to go on with the war.

— Plutarch, Life of Pyrrhus

In both Epirote victories, the Romans suffered greater casualties, but they had a much larger pool of replacements, so the casualties had less impact on the Roman war effort than the losses had on the campaign of King Pyrrhus.

The report is often quoted as:

Ne ego si iterum eodem modo vicero, sine ullo milite Epirum revertar.
If I achieve such a victory again, I shall return to Epirus without a single soldier.

— Orosius

or:

If we are victorious in one more battle with the Romans, we shall be utterly ruined.

— Plutarch

== Examples ==
=== War ===
This list comprises examples of battles that ended in a Pyrrhic victory. It is not intended to be complete but to illustrate the concept.

- Battle of Asculum (279 BC), Pyrrhus of Epirus and Italian allies against the Roman Republic: the Romans, though suffering twice as many casualties, could easily replenish their ranks. Pyrrhus lost most of his commanders and a great part of the forces he had brought to Italy, and he withdrew to Sicily.
- Battle of Avarayr (451), Vardan Mamikonian and Christian Armenian rebels against the Sassanid Empire: the Persians were victorious and forced the outnumbered Armenians to retreat, but lost so many soldiers that the battle proved to be a strategic victory for Armenians, as Avarayr paved the way to the Nvarsak Treaty (AD 484), which assured Armenian autonomy and religious freedom.
- Battle of St. Jakob an der Birs (1444), The battle itself was a devastating defeat for the Swiss, and a significant blow to Bern, the canton which contributed the force, it was nevertheless a Swiss success in strategic terms. Because of the heavy casualties on the French side, the original plan of moving towards Zürich, where a Swiss force of 30,000 was ready, was judged unfavorably by the Dauphin. The French troops turned back, contributing to the eventual Swiss victory in the Old Zürich War.
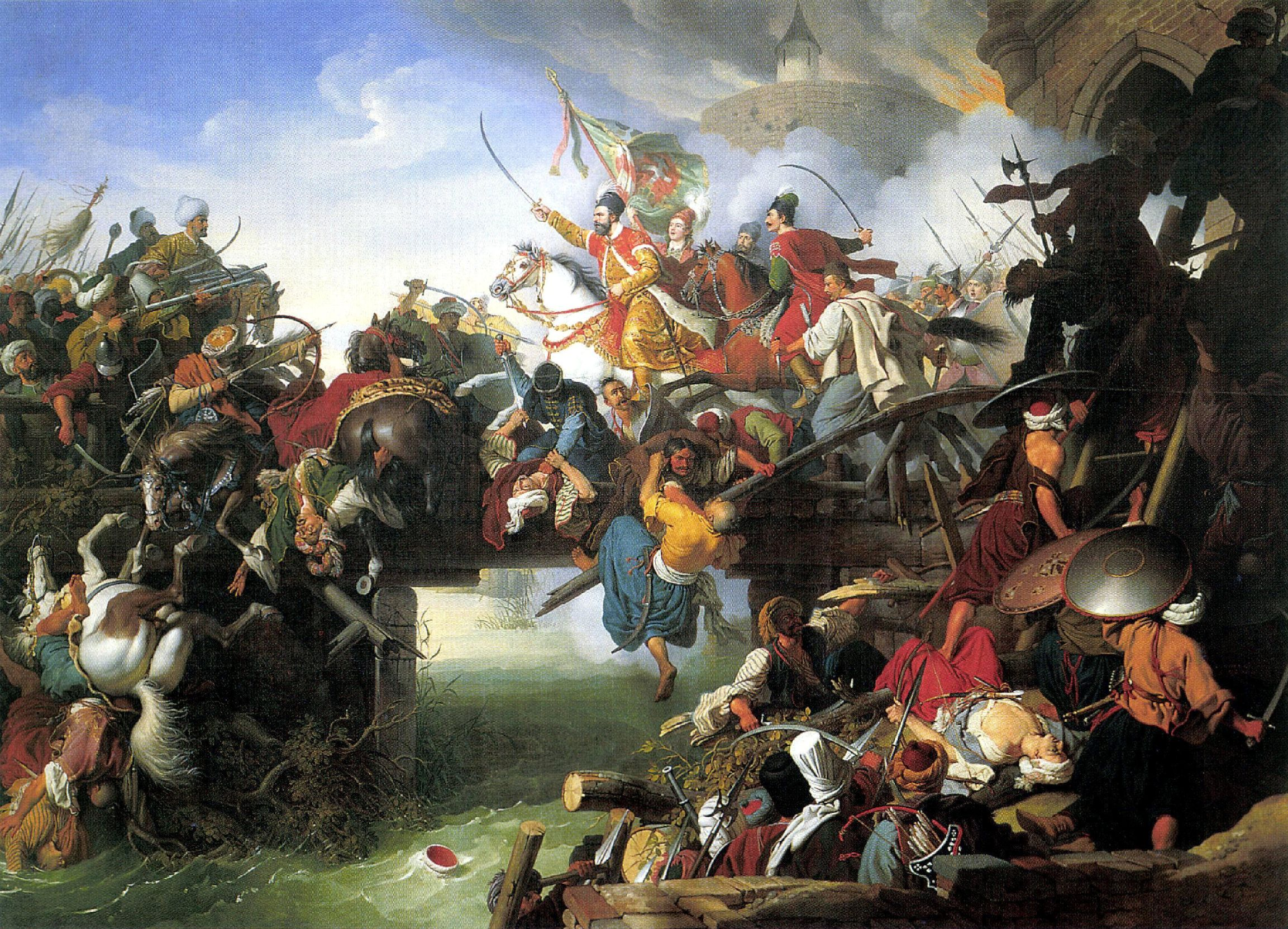
- Last stand and final charge from the fortress of Szigetvár (painting by Johann Peter Krafft, 1825)
  Siege of Szigetvár (1566), Ottoman–Habsburg wars: although the Ottomans won the siege after 33 days, it can be seen as a Pyrrhic victory because of the heavy Ottoman casualties, the death of Sultan Suleiman, and the resulting delay to the Ottoman push for Vienna that year which suspended Ottoman expansion in Europe.
- Siege of Ostend (1601–1604), Eighty Years' War: for three years the Spanish attempted to capture this port from Dutch and English defenders, even as the Dutch expanded their territory further east – including capturing the port of Sluis to replace Ostend before surrendering. The Spaniards ultimately captured the city, but the vast cost and casualties of the siege were compounded by Spain's subsequent campaign to recapture the Dutch gains, which achieved little, and by 1607 Spain was bankrupt. The resultant Twelve Years' Truce effectively made the Dutch Republic an independent state.
- Battle of Gangwana (1741), at Gangwana the 1,000-strong Rathore cavalry of the Kingdom of Marwar fought against the combined armies of the Mughal Empire and Jaipur, numbering 100,000 with hundreds of cannons and artillery. Jaipur emerged victorious but with heavy losses of 12,000 killed and thousands wounded, resulting in a peace treaty favorable to Marwar.
- Battle of Bunker Hill (1775), American Revolutionary War: after mounting three assaults on the colonial forces, the British won control of the Boston peninsula in the early stages of the war, but the engagement cost them many more casualties than the Americans had incurred (including a large number of officers) and led them to adopt more cautious methods, which helped American rebel forces; the political repercussions increased colonial support for independence.
- Battle of Guilford Court House (1781), American Revolutionary War: in this short battle, the outnumbered British force defeated an American army; the British lost a considerable number of men, and their drive to conquer the southern colonies changed course.
- Battle of Chancellorsville (1863), American Civil War: General Robert E. Lee split his army in the face of Joseph Hooker's larger Union force; the audacious strategy allowed the Confederate army to win the day against a numerically superior foe. However, 20% of Lee's army was injured or killed, including General Stonewall Jackson, and his losses were difficult to replace. Lee's weakened army went on the offensive, but less than two months later was defeated and forced to retreat after the Battle of Gettysburg.
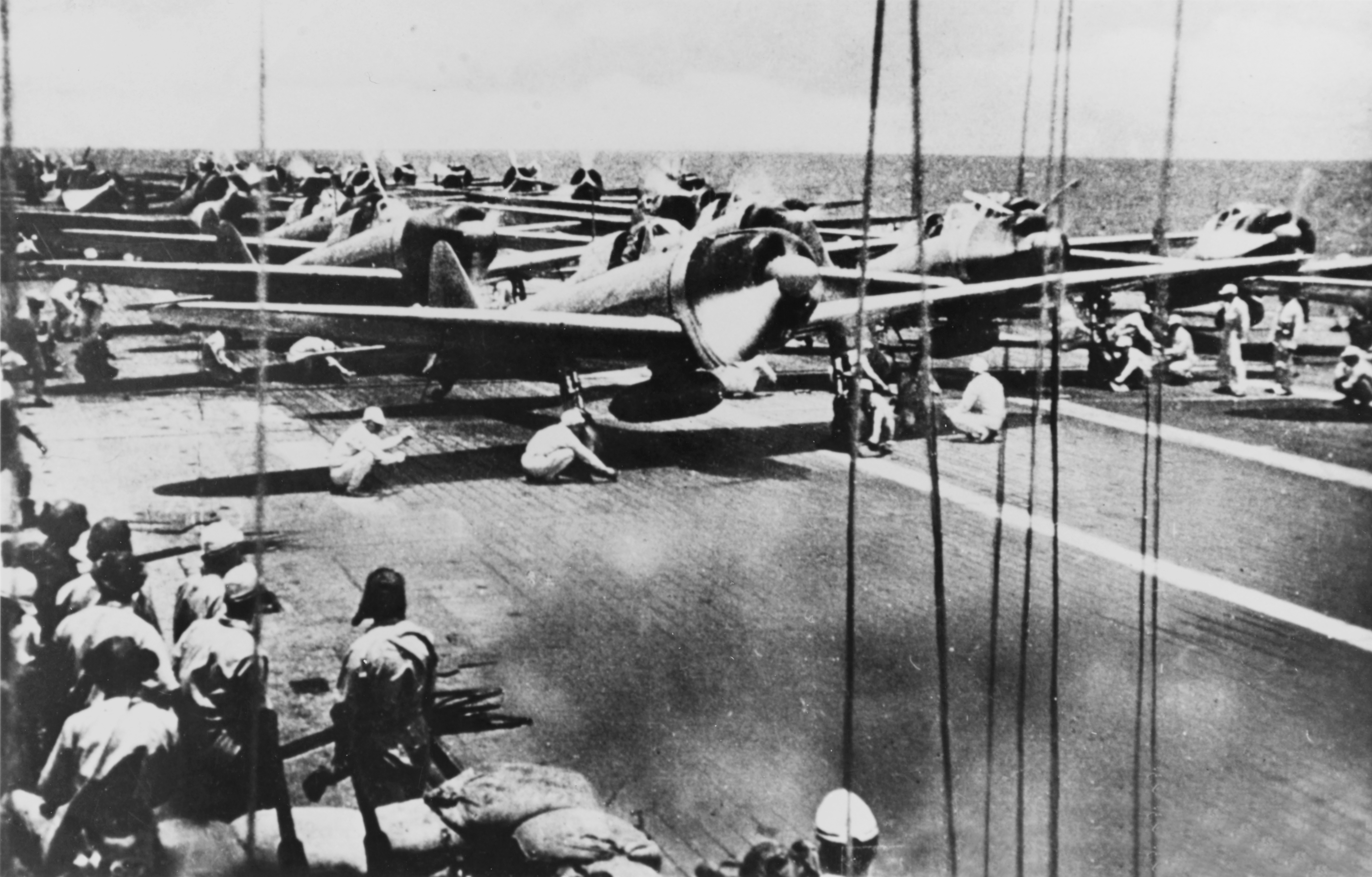
- Japanese aircraft prepare to take off from Shōkaku during the Battle of the Santa Cruz Islands
  Battle of the Santa Cruz Islands (1942), World War II, Solomon Islands Campaign: Japanese and Allied naval forces met during the struggle for Guadalcanal and nearby islands. After an exchange of carrier air attacks, U.S. surface ships retreated with one aircraft carrier sunk along with a destroyer and another carrier and a battleship severely damaged. The Japanese carrier forces achieved a tactical victory, as none of their ships were sunk, but the heavy loss of 100 airplanes and irreplaceable veteran aircrews was to the strategic advantage of the Allies. Japanese ground forces on Guadalcanal had also just lost the Battle for Henderson Field and were in no position to take advantage of the new situation.
- Battle of Chosin Reservoir (1950), Korean War: the Chinese army attempted to encircle and destroy the much smaller United Nations forces, but in a 17-day battle in freezing weather, the U.N. forces inflicted crippling losses on the Chinese while making a fighting withdrawal. The Chinese occupied northeast Korea but they did not recover until the spring, and the U.N. maintained a foothold in Korea.
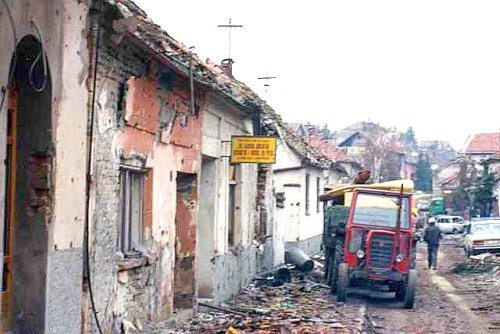
- The ruined streets of Vukovar ten days after its surrender
  Battle of Vukovar (1991), Croatian War of Independence: the Yugoslav People's Army (JNA) laid siege to the city of Vukovar, held by the Croatian National Guard and civilian volunteers. After 87 days, the ruined city fell to the JNA. Although the Yugoslav army and Serbian paramilitaries had about twenty times more soldiers as well as armoured and artillery superiority, they suffered twice as many losses. The battle exhausted the JNA and proved a turning point in the Croatian War of Independence.

=== Politics, sports and law ===
The term is used as an analogy in business, politics and sports to describe struggles that end up ruining the victor. A Pyrrhic victory in a sporting context could range from a team winning a game yet a star player gets hurt in the process, or a win costing them an opportunity at a better selection in the draft.

Theologian Reinhold Niebuhr commented on the necessity of coercion in preserving the course of justice by warning,

Moral reason must learn how to make coercion its ally without running the risk of a Pyrrhic victory in which the ally exploits and negates the triumph.

— Karl Paul Reinhold Niebuhr

In Beauharnais v. Illinois, a 1952 U.S. Supreme Court decision involving a charge proscribing group libel, Associate Justice Black alluded to Pyrrhus in his dissent,

If minority groups hail this holding as their victory, they might consider the possible relevancy of this ancient remark: "Another such victory and I am undone".

— Hugo Black

== See also ==
- Attrition warfare – Military strategy of wearing down the enemy
- Cadmean victory – Victory involving one's own ruin
- Carthaginian peace – Brutal peace imposed after war
- Cassandra (metaphor) – Metaphor originating from Greek mythology
- John Henryism – Strategy for coping with prolonged exposure to stress
- Last stand – Situation in which a military unit holds against overwhelming odds
- List of military disasters
- Moral victory – Loss with some moral gain
- Mutual assured destruction – Doctrine of military strategy
- Parthian shot – Light cavalry hit-and-run tactic used by the Parthians
- Pyrrhic defeat theory – Theory in criminology
- Strategic victory – Winning a long-term advantage
- Suicide attack – Violent tactic resulting in the attacker's intentional death
- Sunk cost fallacy – Unrecoverable cost that has been incurred
- Tactical victory – Accomplishment of a military operation's tactical objective
- Winner's curse – Tendency to overestimate in auctions
- Zugzwang – Disadvantage in a game due to obligation to move
