= Agios Kosmas =

Agios Kosmas Άγιος Κοσμάς
- Municipal unit
- Location within the regional unit

- Location within Greece
- Coordinates: 40°9.1′N 21°15′E
- Country: Greece
- Administrative region: Western Macedonia
- Regional unit: Grevena
- Municipality: Grevena

Area
  - Municipal unit: 115.087 km^{2} (44.435 sq mi)
  - Community: 9.496 km^{2} (3.666 sq mi)
- Elevation: 962 m (3,156 ft)

Population (2021)
  - Municipal unit: 681
  - Municipal unit density: 5.92/km^{2} (15.3/sq mi)
  - Community: 54
  - Community density: 5.7/km^{2} (15/sq mi)
- Time zone: UTC+2 (EET)
  - Summer (DST): UTC+3 (EEST)
- Postal code: 511 00
- Area code: +30-2462
- Vehicle registration: PN

Agios Kosmas (Greek: Άγιος Κοσμάς, before 1927: Τσιράκι – Tsiraki) is a village, a community and a municipal unit of the Grevena municipality. Before the 2011 local government reform it was an independent municipality. The municipality was established in 1997 with the name Kosmas o Aitolos (Κοσμάς ο Αιτωλός), which was changed to Agios Kosmas in 2004. The seat of the municipality was in Megaro. The 2021 census recorded 54 residents in the community and 681 residents in the municipal unit. The community of Agios Kosmas covers an area of 9.496 km^{2} while the municipal unit covers an area of 115.087 km^{2}. The village is named after the 18th-century saint Cosmas the Aetolian.

== Administrative division ==
The municipal unit of Agios Kosmas consists of nine communities: Agios Kosmas, Dasyllio, Kalirachi, Kalloni, Kydonies, Kyparissi, Megaro, Oropedio and Trikorfo.

The community of Agios Kosmas consists of three settlements: Agios Kosmas, Ano Ekklisia and Ekklisia.

== Population ==
Historical population
Year	Pop.	±%
2001	1,243	—
2011	870	−30.0%
2021	681	−21.7%

== See also ==
- List of settlements in the Grevena regional unit
