= Grevena =

Town in Macedonia, Greece

Grevena Γρεβενά Grebini
- Municipality
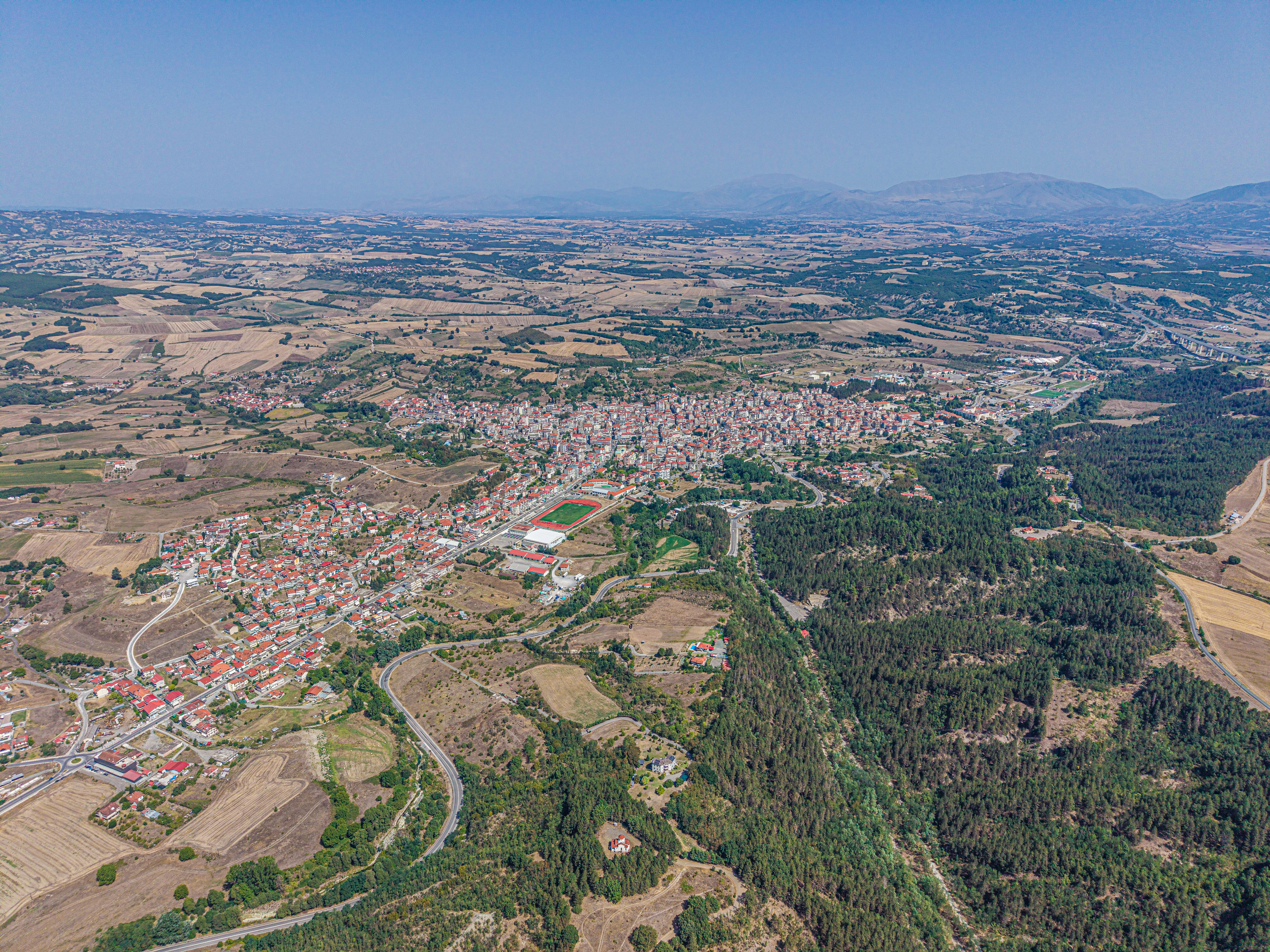
- Aerial view of Grevena

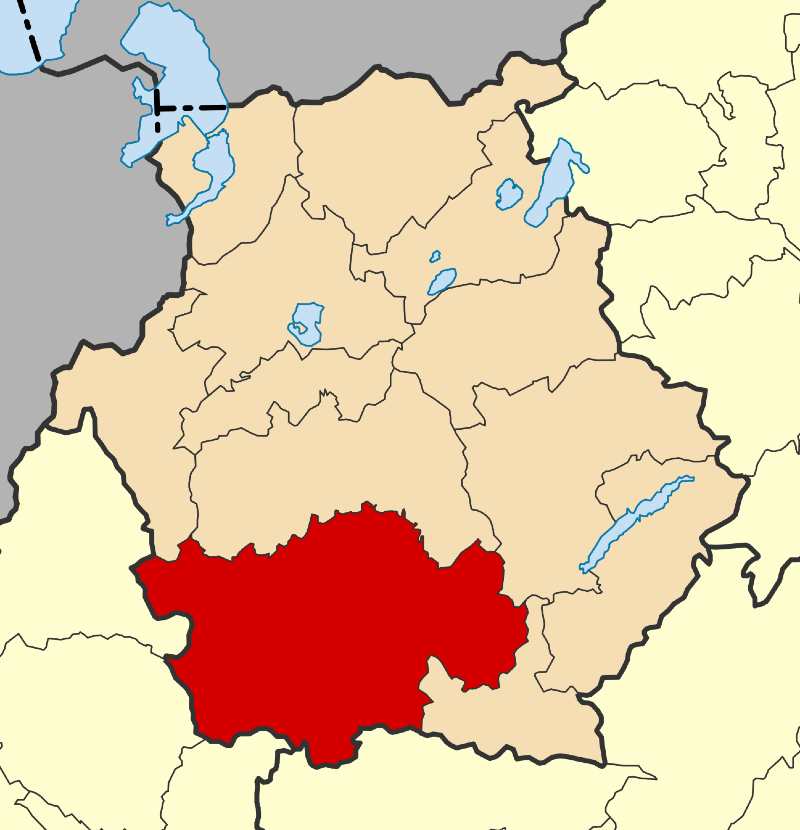

- Location within Greece
- Coordinates: 40°05′06″N 21°25′39″E
- Country: Greece
- Geographic region: Macedonia
- Administrative region: Western Macedonia
- Regional unit: Grevena

Government
  - Mayor: Kyriakos Tataridis (since 2023)

Area
  - Municipality: 1,859.9 km^{2} (718.1 sq mi)
  - Municipal unit: 461.4 km^{2} (178.1 sq mi)
- Elevation: 530 m (1,740 ft)

Population (2021)
  - Municipality: 21,421
  - Density: 11.517/km^{2} (29.830/sq mi)
  - Municipal unit: 15,716
  - Municipal unit density: 34.06/km^{2} (88.22/sq mi)
  - Community: 12,515
- Time zone: UTC+2 (EET)
  - Summer (DST): UTC+3 (EEST)
- Postal code: 511 00
- Area code: 24620
- Vehicle registration: ΡΝ
- Website: www.dimosgrevenon.gr

Grevena (Greek: Γρεβενά, Grevená [ɣreveˈna]; Aromanian: Grebini) is a town and municipality in Western Macedonia, northern Greece, and the capital of the Grevena regional unit. Grevena lies about 420 kilometres (261 miles) from Athens and about 180 km (112 miles) from Thessaloniki. According to the 2021 census, the town's population is 12,515, and that of the municipality 25,905.

Grevena has immediate access to the A2 motorway (Egnatia Odos) since the early 2000s. The motorway connects Igoumenitsa (an important port connecting the west coast of Greece with Italy) to Thessaloniki and Alexandroupoli (at the border with Turkey). A direct series of motorway links to Athens will become available sometime in 2026 through the completion of the northern section of the E65 Central Motorway.

Mountains surround the municipality, which is situated by the river Greveniotikos, which itself flows into the Aliakmon.

Other significant towns in the municipality are Amygdalies and Mega Seirini. The Grevena Municipal Museum is located in the town.

== History ==
=== Ottoman period ===
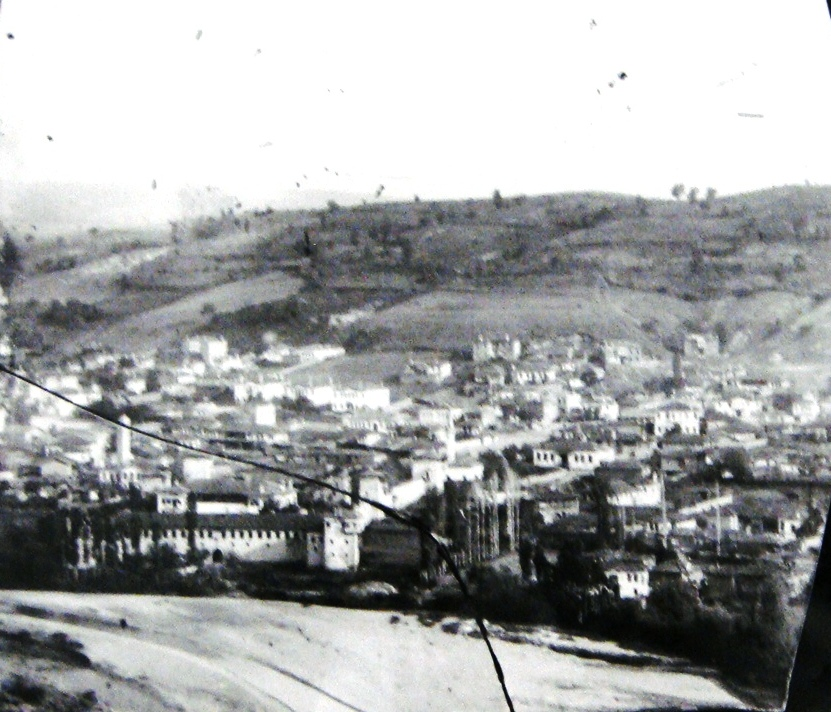
Photo of Grevena (1900) by the Manakis brothers

Under Ottoman rule, Grevena was a small administrative and military centre, the seat of a kaza belonging to the Sanjak of Serfiğe within the Vilayet of Manastir. According to the statistics of Vasil Kanchov ("Macedonia, Ethnography and Statistics"), 600 Greek Christians, 500 Turks, 200 Greek Muslims (Vallahades), 150 Aromanians and 100 Romani lived in the town in 1900.

=== As part of Greece ===
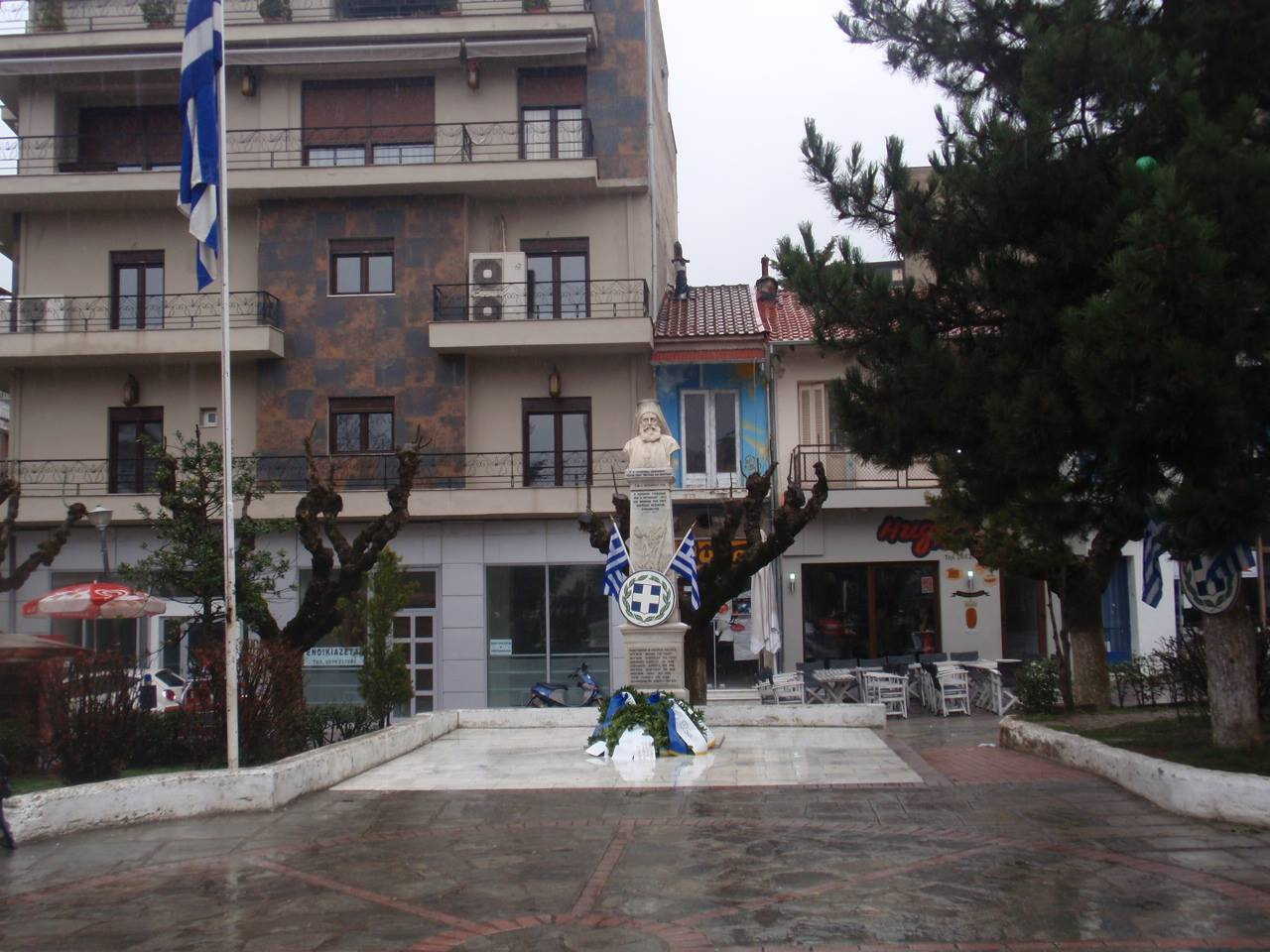
Aimilianos Square in Grevena

The town was ceded to Greece from the Ottoman Empire in 1913 after the Treaty of Bucharest that ended the Balkan Wars.

The 1920 Greek census recorded 3,108 people in Grevena, and in 1923, before the Greek–Turkish population exchange, 200 of its inhabitants (40 families) were Muslim. Following the population exchange, the Muslims were transferred to Turkey and 55 families of Greek refugees had settled in their place by 1926, out of which 33 were from Western Asia Minor, 16 from Pontus, and 6 from East Thrace. In the 1928 Greek census, the number of refugee families was recorded at 52, making up 194 people out of the town's 3,747 inhabitants.

Due to its small size, the town's Ottoman past, represented through a few public buildings and the homes of Muslims located in the urban centre, all disappeared during the 20th century. A mosque and a madrasa remained in Grevena until the population exchange; later both were destroyed. Another mosque existed in Grevena and was converted into a church in 1927; later it and its minaret were demolished, and the church of Agios Achillios built on the site. Military barracks remained until World War Two, and were later destroyed. The large granite fortress residence (konak) of Veli Bey was destroyed after the population exchange.

==== 1995 earthquake ====
The earthquake that occurred in the region on 13 May 1995 was 6.6 on the Richter magnitude scale, but it caused only material damage. The worst hit area was the county of Ventzia. There were two foreshocks of lesser intensity that preceded the main earthquake by a few minutes and warned people. These warnings sent the population out of their houses. When the main earthquake came, it destroyed nearly all the houses in several villages of the Ventzia County – the houses collapsed to the ground – but all the inhabitants were outside.

==== 2005 earthquake ====
Another earthquake on 5 January 2005 measured 4.9 near Grevena. It took place at 20:00 local time (EET), and no damage was reported. Another earthquake with a measured intensity of 5.4 occurred on 17 July 2007 at 21:23 local time (EET) and was followed by weak aftershocks. Some older buildings were lightly damaged in villages northeast of Grevena.

== Administrative division ==
Grevena municipality (light red) and municipal unit (dark red)

=== Municipality ===
The municipality Grevena was formed at the 2011 local government reform by the merger of the following 13 former municipalities, that became municipal units:

- Agios Kosmas
- Dotsiko
- Filippaioi
- Gorgiani
- Grevena
- Irakleotes
- Mesolouri
- Samarina
- Smixi
- Theodoros Ziakas
- Ventzio

=== Municipal unit ===
The municipal unit of Grevena is divided into the following communities:

- Agioi Theodoroi
- Amygdalies
- Elatos
- Elefthero
- Felli
- Kalochi
- Kyrakali
- Megalo Seirini
- Myrsina
- Rodia
- Megaro
- Vatolakkos

=== Community ===
The community of Grevena consists of three separate settlements:

- Doxaras (population 190 in 2021)
- Grevena (population 12,293)
- Kalamitsi (population 30)

== Education ==
Two departments of the University of Western Macedonia based in the city, the departments of Statistics and Insurance Science and of Business Administration.

== Economy ==
In the area, there is large production of mushrooms, collected in the Valia Calda area. It is also the place of production of Anevato cheese.

== Climate ==
Grevena has a mediterranean continental climate characterized by a great diurnal temperature variation. Winters are cold with frequent snowfalls, whereas summers are hot during the day and cool during the night.

Climate data for Grevena (510m)
Month	Jan	Feb	Mar	Apr	May	Jun	Jul	Aug	Sep	Oct	Nov	Dec	Year
Mean daily maximum °C (°F)	7.4 (45.3)	8 (46)	14 (57)	18.6 (65.5)	24.1 (75.4)	29 (84)	31.5 (88.7)	32.4 (90.3)	28.5 (83.3)	22.5 (72.5)	15.4 (59.7)	10.6 (51.1)	20.2 (68.2)
Mean daily minimum °C (°F)	−5.8 (21.6)	−2.1 (28.2)	0.4 (32.7)	4 (39)	7.6 (45.7)	12.3 (54.1)	14.5 (58.1)	14.4 (57.9)	11.3 (52.3)	6.8 (44.2)	3.4 (38.1)	2.2 (36.0)	5.8 (42.3)
Average precipitation mm (inches)	50 (2.0)	40 (1.6)	27.2 (1.07)	56.6 (2.23)	29.6 (1.17)	20 (0.8)	20 (0.8)	10 (0.4)	30 (1.2)	50 (2.0)	80 (3.1)	87 (3.4)	500.4 (19.77)
Source: http://penteli.meteo.gr/stations/grevena/ (2019 – 2020 averages)

== Historical population ==
Year	Community	Municipal unit	Municipality
1981	7,739	—	—
1991	9,345	14,986	—
2001	12,037	16,421	—
2011	13,374	17,610	25,905
2021	12,515	15,716	21,421

== People ==
- Theodoros Ziakas, fighter in the Greek revolution
- Konstantinos Dimidis, printer, gunsmith, fighter in the Greek revolution
- Charissios Tziogas, fighter in the Greek revolution
- Nicolaos Tsolakis, chieftain of the Greek Struggle for Macedonia
- Nicolaos Zamkinos, leader of the Greek Struggle for Macedonia
- Georgios Boussios, fighter of the Greek Struggle for Macedonia, politician, minister of the Interior (Greece)
- Kostas Koutsomytis, director
- Kostas Papanikolaou, former NBA player
- Miltiadis Tentoglou, Olympic and European champion long jumper
- Eva Chantava, volleyball player
