= Grab-it =

Brand of cookware

Grab-it is a brand of Corning Ware cookware products easily identifiable by their uniform distinctive shape: a bowl with vertical sides and a rounded, concave tab handle. The name was first used for a versatile product which could safely go from refrigerator to stovetop, oven, broiler, or microwave, but later, inferior products, nearly identical in appearance but unsafe for stovetop or broiler use, were also branded as Corning Ware Grab-it. Before the introduction of the stoneware look-alike product, the Grab-it line was made of Pyroceram, a glass-ceramic material, by Corning Glass Works. Grab-its are notable as being among the first cookware specifically designed for microwave use. Their original design was recognized by the Smithsonian's Cooper–Hewitt, National Design Museum. Grab-its strongly resemble porringers.

The original Grab-it (the P-150), introduced in 1976, was opaque white and had a capacity of 15 US fluid ounces (440 ml). Later, the matching 24-US-fluid-ounce (710 ml) Grab-A-Meal (P-240) was introduced, with a small handle opposite the main one. This product was discontinued in 1986. Later, Visions Grab-its were introduced in 15-oz and 24-US-fluid-ounce (710 ml) sizes (V-155 and V-245, respectively), unifying the name for the two sizes. The 15-ounce Grab-it was available with a plastic cover (for storage, allowing stacking) or a Pyrex glass lid (for storage or cooking use), or both, while only a glass lid was available for the larger Grab-it and Grab-A-Meal. In addition to microwave use, Grab-its made of Pyroceram (i.e. earlier Corning Ware, and all Visions) are safe on the stovetop, in the oven, and (without cover) under a broiler.

== History ==
Grab-its were originally produced and sold by Corning Glass Works, and made from opaque Pyroceram glass–ceramic material.

Corning introduced Grab-its under the Visions brand in 1988. These were made of transparent Pyroceram (known as Celexium in some regions) with an amber tint. A Cranberry variant was introduced in the early 1990s.

Not long after the Corning Consumer Products Company (now known as Corelle Brands) was spun off in 1998, Pyroceram Grab-its were discontinued in the U.S. with the close of the Martinsburg, WV plant in the early 2000s.

A short time later a product of inferior material was introduced with the same branding and nearly identical appearance; this stoneware product is molded to look like the earlier, superior Pyroceram product but cannot tolerate stovetop or broiler use, and in microwave use its handle becomes too hot to touch much more quickly than in the earlier product. Amber 15-ounce Visions Grab-its are still made of transparent Pyroceram in France for sales in select European and Asia-Pacific regions.

== Gallery ==
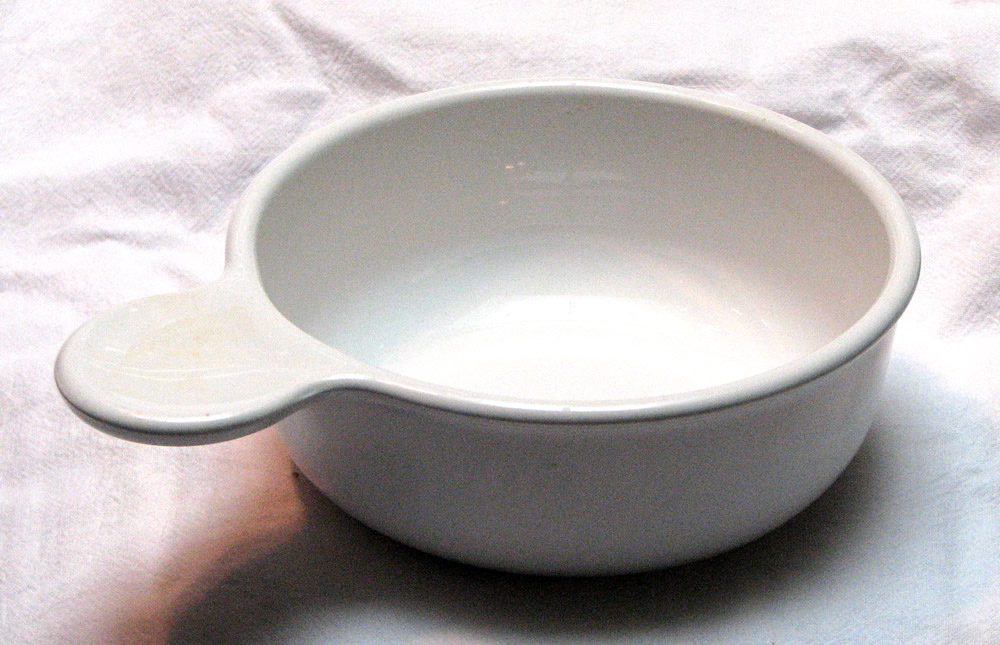
An original Grab-it P-150-B

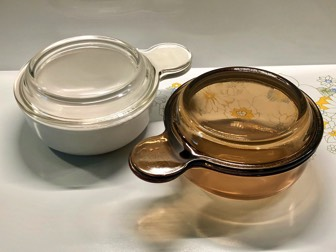
Corning Ware and Visions Grab-its

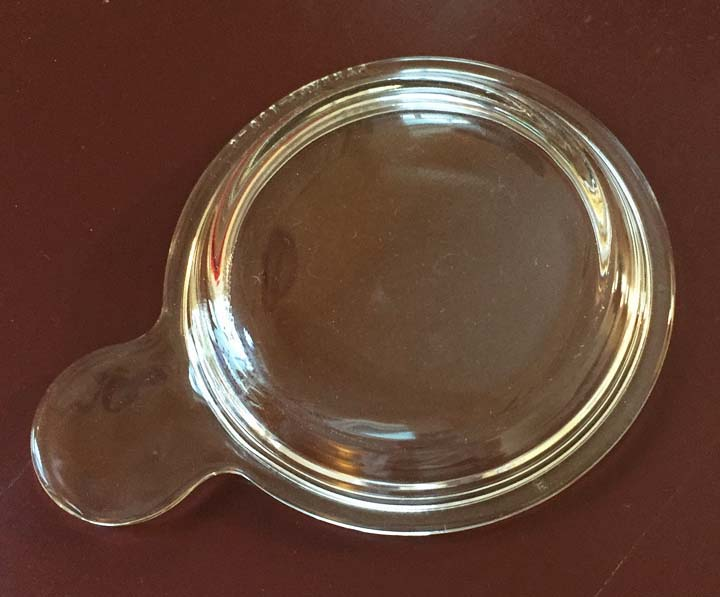
Glass Grab-it lid, 5 1/2 inches (140 mm) in diameter (not counting handle)

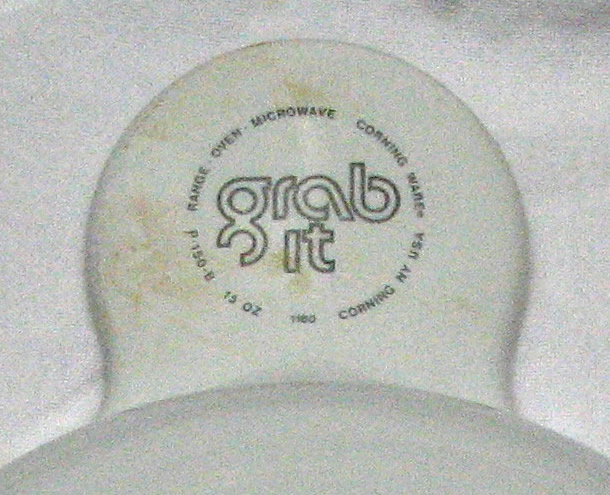
A close-up of the underside of an original Grab-it tab, showing its uses and place of origin

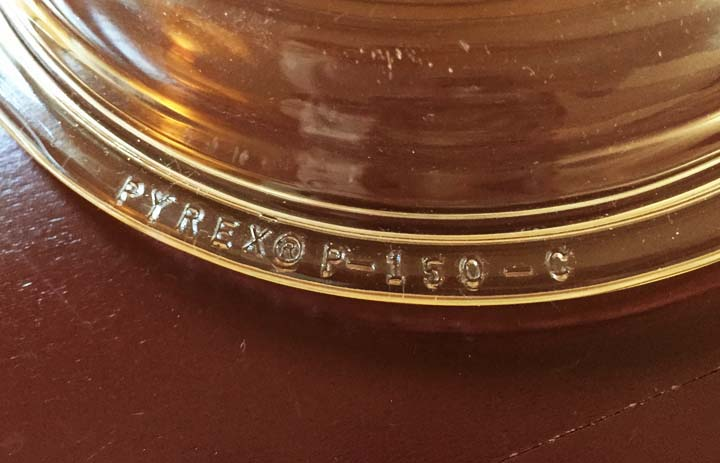
Close-up of marking on glass Grab-it lid, 5 1/2 inches (140 mm) in diameter (not counting handle), which reads "PYREX® P–150–C"
