= Ceran =

Glass-ceramic material / brand used for cooktops

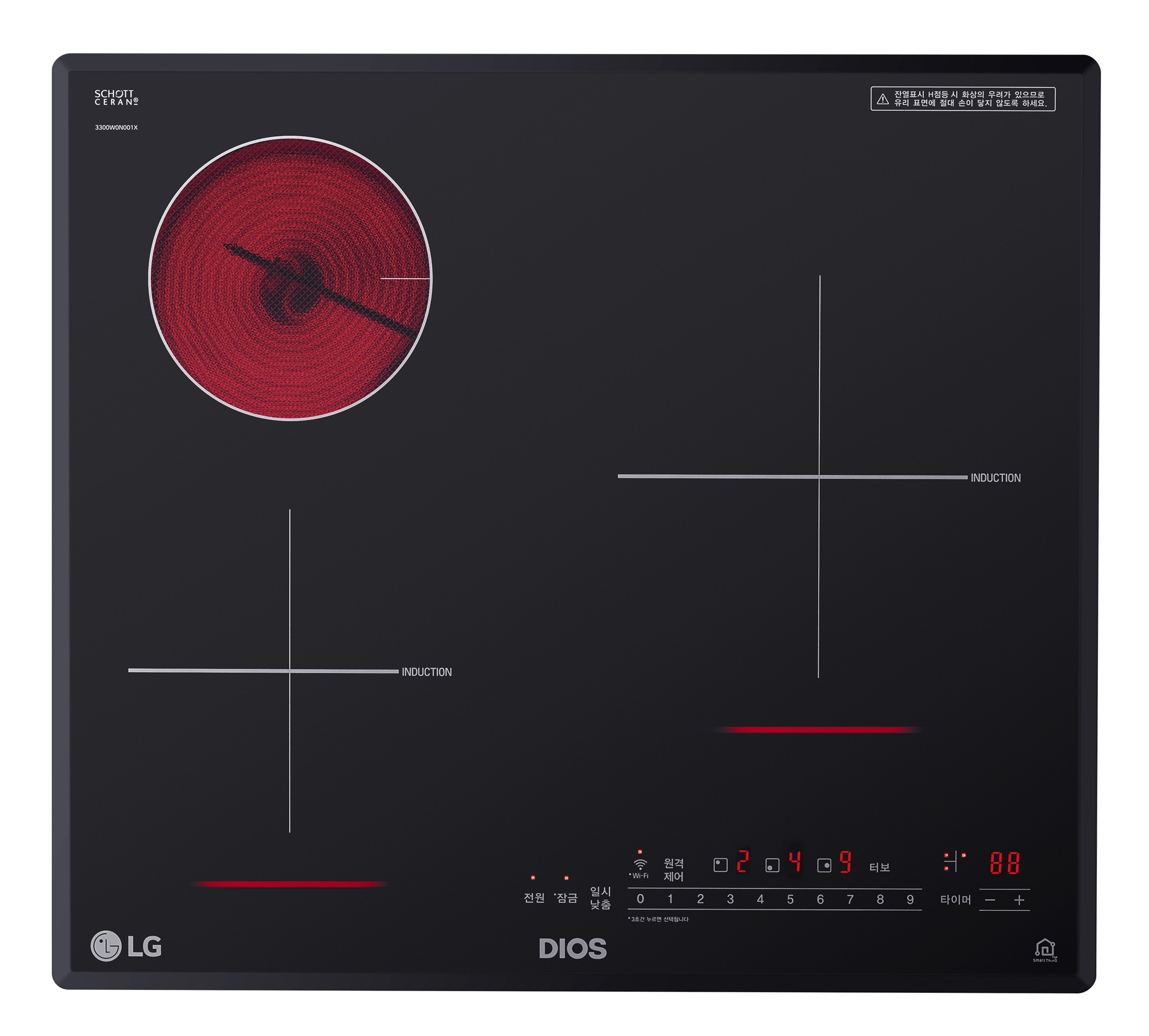
Ceran cooktop for electric heating with small touch screen

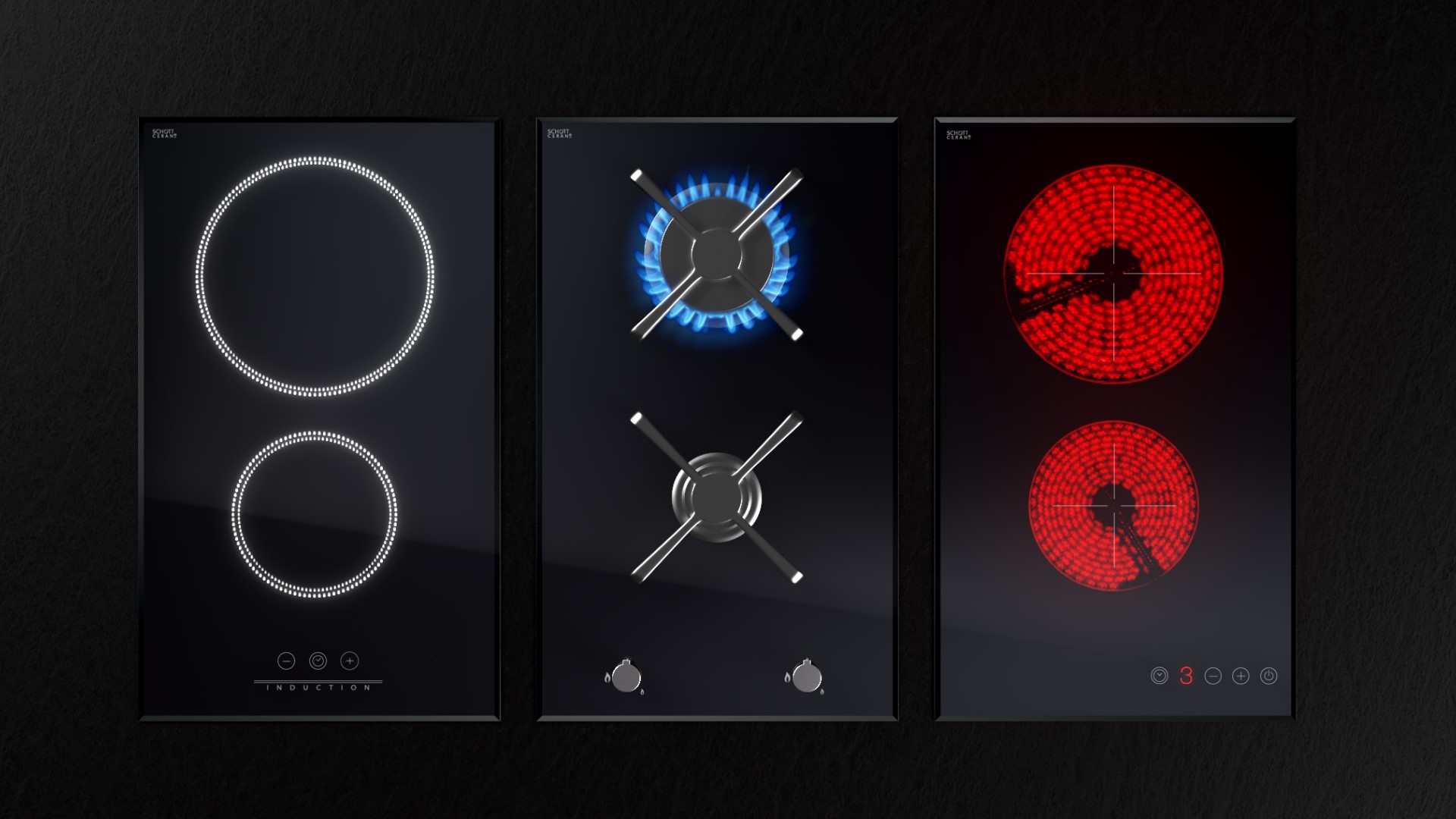
Ceran cooktop for 3 heating methods: induction, gas and electric

Ceran is a brand of lithium aluminosilicate glass-ceramic developed and manufactured by Schott AG. It is used as a material for cooktop surfaces in electric, induction, and gas stoves.

Compared to traditional electric stoves with cast-iron plates, Ceran cooktops transfer heat directly to the cookware while the surrounding surface remains relatively cool. The material is highly resistant to thermal shock and can withstand temperature fluctuations of up to 700 °C.

Introduced in 1971, Ceran initially became common in Germany, where the name is frequently used colloquially as a generic term for glass-ceramic cooktops, although this usage is technically inaccurate. The term "Ceran" has also received an entry in the Duden, the authoritative German language dictionary.

== History ==
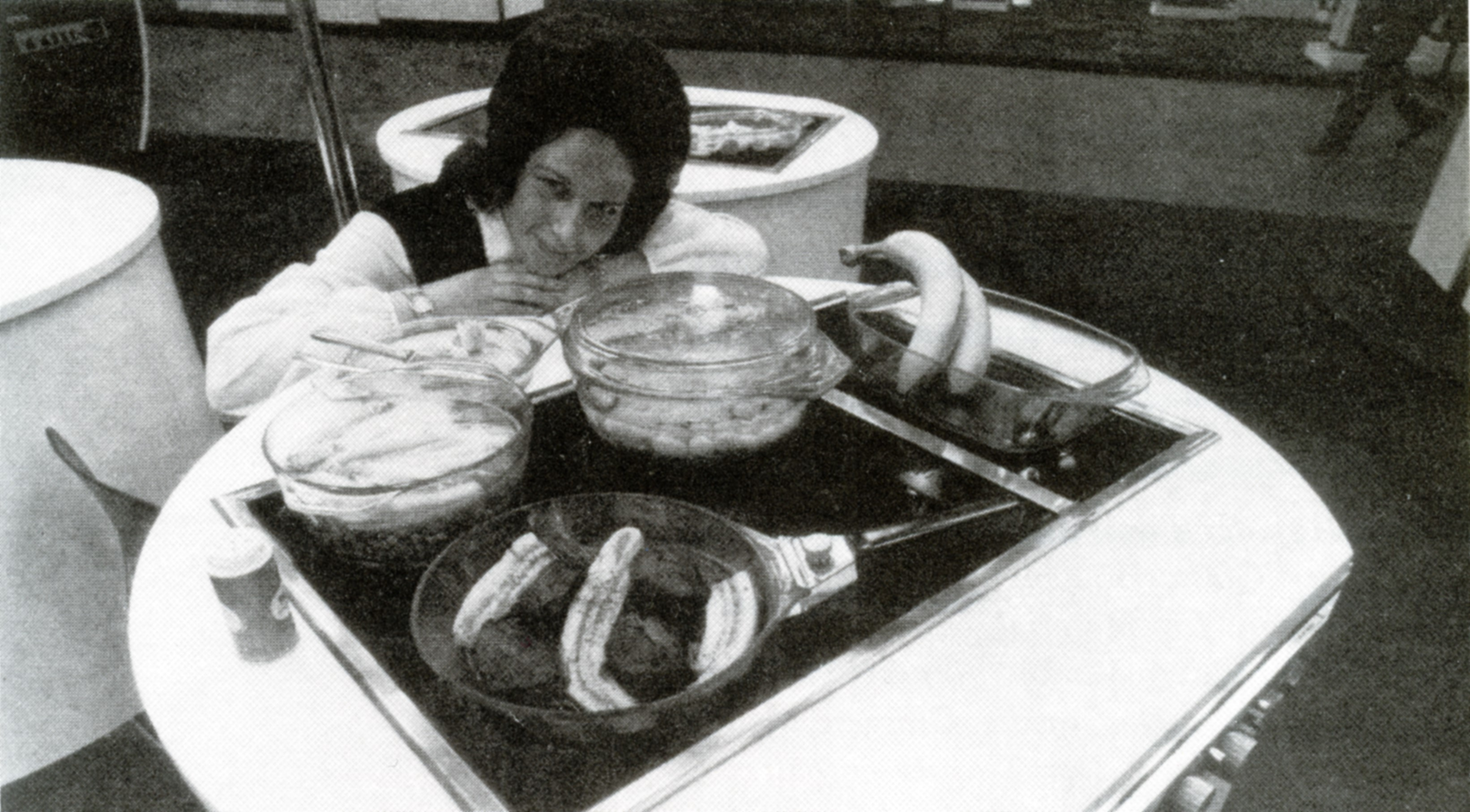
Ceran cooktop introduced at the 1971 Domotechnika home appliances trade fair

In the late 1960s, German company Schott developed a glass-ceramic material called Zerodur for telescope mirror substrates, commissioned by the Max Planck Institute for Astronomy. Building on this work, Schott began exploring potential applications for the material in household appliances, particularly cooktops, due to its extremely low thermal expansion.

In collaboration with the German appliance manufacturer Imperial (now part of Miele), Schott developed the first black glass-ceramic cooktop surface. The prototype was introduced in 1971. In the first two years after serial production began in 1973, the company sold 7,000 Ceran cooktops.

In the following years, Ceran became the market leader for glass-ceramic cooktops in Germany. By 1995, it had a market share of around 95%. It was also sold internationally, reaching 30 countries and achieving a 90% share of the European market by this time. Its adoption has been attributed to its thermal resistance and mechanical strength. It is also recognized for its influence in kitchen design.

By 1980, Schott had manufactured one million Ceran cooktops. By 2010, total production reached 100 million units, and in 2021, the 200 millionth cooktop was produced. By 2021, Ceran has been sold in over 140 countries.

Since 2009, the company was the first in the industry to produce glass-ceramic cooktops without using toxic heavy metals like arsenic and antimony. In 2025, the company completed a pilot project in which it successfully recycled 50 tons of glass-ceramic cooktops from different manufacturers.

== Manufacturing Process ==
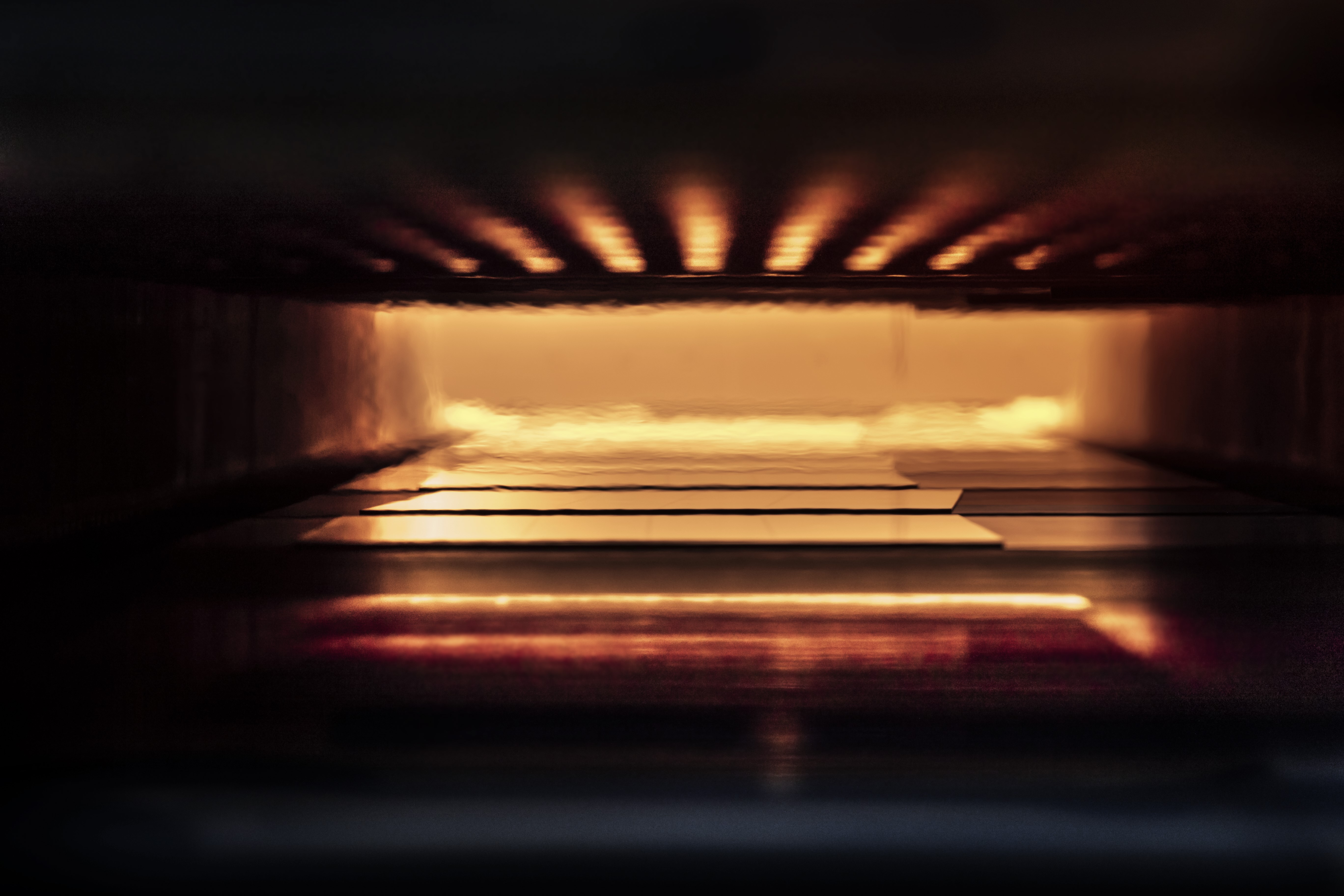
Ceran panels during production

Ceran is produced using a multi-stage process involving both melting and controlled crystallization of glass from the lithium aluminosilicate (Li₂O–Al₂O₃–SiO₂) system.

The process begins with melting the raw materials at temperatures of approximately 1600 °C. The molten glass is then rolled and extruded to achieve a uniform thickness of approximately 4–5 mm and slowly cooled in a controlled manner. Once the glass cools below 100 °C, it is cut into large sheets, which are subsequently trimmed to their final dimensions. Additional processing steps include edge smoothing and beveling, drilling holes for control elements, and printing graphics onto the surface.

In the final phase, the panels are reheated to around 900 °C to induce partial crystallization, transforming the material into a glass-ceramic. This process results in a material that retains the appearance and smoothness of glass while gaining the thermal resistance and mechanical strength of ceramic.

== Material Properties ==
Ceran is composed of approximately 21% aluminum oxide and 72% quartz sand.

Its mechanical properties include:

- Density: ρ ≈ 2.6 g/cm^{3}
- Modulus of elasticity (ASTM C-1259): E ≈ 95 x 10³ MPa
- Poisson's ratio (ASTM C-1259): μ ≈ 0.25
- Knoop hardness (ISO 9385): HK 0.1/20 ≈ 600
- Bending strength: σ̅ bB ≥ 110 MPa

Its thermal properties include:

- Thermal conductivity (DIN 51936, ASTM 1461–01): λ (100°) ≈ 1.6 W / (m×K).
