= CorningWare =

Brand of dish and other cookware pieces

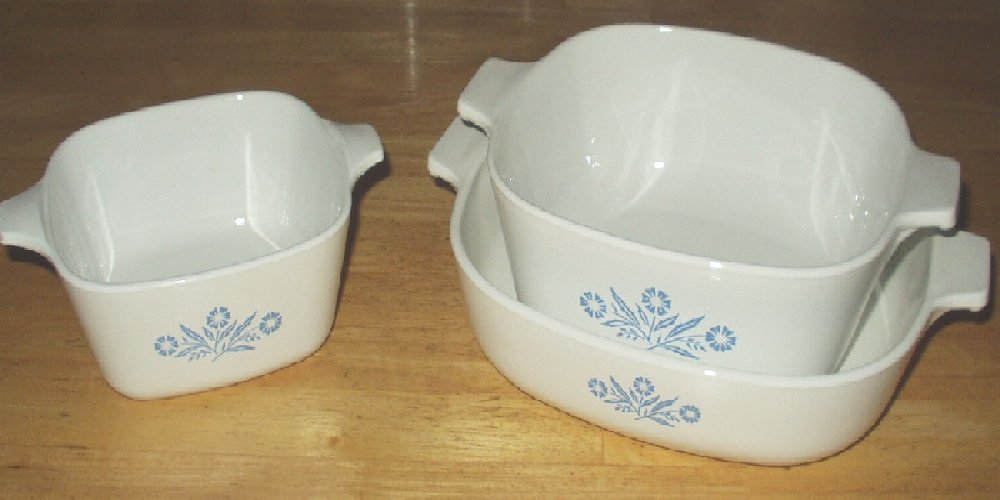
Original CorningWare caseroles, with the 'Blue Cornflower' decoration

Corning Ware, also written CorningWare, is a brand of unique glass-ceramic (Pyroceram) cookware resistant to thermal shock introduced in 1958 by Corning Glass Works (later Corning Inc.) in the United States. The brand was later spun off with the sale of the Corning Consumer Products Company subsidiary, now known as Corelle Brands.

Pyroceram has properties similar to glass and ceramic, and CorningWare was advertised as being capable of being taken from the refrigerator or freezer and used directly on the stovetop, in an oven or microwave, or under a broiler, and going into a dishwasher.

After being discontinued in the U.S. in 2001, the Pyroceram-based line of CorningWare was reintroduced there in 2008 as CorningWare StoveTop.

In early 2022, sales of Pyroceram-based CorningWare were temporarily discontinued in the USA but reappeared on the market in early 2023. It continues to be sold worldwide, and it is popular in North America, Asia, and Australia.

== History ==
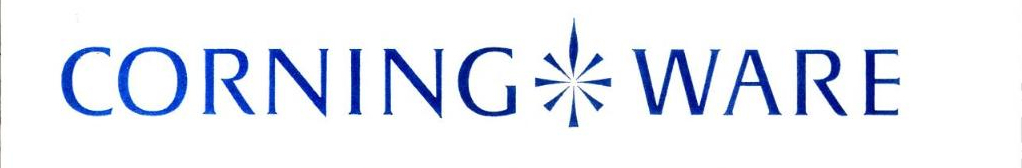
Original Corning Ware logotype. The stylized burner icon indicates pieces that are range-top safe.

=== Discovery ===
In 1953 S. Donald Stookey of the Corning Research and Development Division accidentally discovered Pyroceram, a white glass-ceramic material capable of withstanding a thermal shock of up to 450 K (840 °F). He was working with photosensitive glass and placed a piece in a furnace, planning on heating it to 600 degrees Fahrenheit. When he checked on his sample, the furnace was at 900 degrees and the glass had turned milky white. He reached into the furnace with tongs to discard the sample, and it slipped and hit the floor without shattering.

Pyroceram was originally used in the ballistic missile program as a heat-resistant material for nose cones.

=== Discontinuation and reintroduction in the U.S. ===
Originally manufactured primarily in the United States, production of Pyroceram-based Corning Ware ceased in the U.S. with the closure of the Martinsburg, West Virginia, plant. While production continued in France, the product was temporarily unavailable in the U.S. and the brand was relaunched as a line of stoneware-based bakeware in 2001.

Corelle Brands' (then known as "World Kitchen") 2001 annual report indicated that the stovetop and dinnerware product lines were halted at the end of the century "as part of a program designed to reduce costs through the elimination of under-utilized capacity, unprofitable product lines, and increased utilization of the remaining facilities."

In December 2008, the Pyroceram-based line of CorningWare was reintroduced in the U.S. as CorningWare StoveTop. It is only manufactured in France at one of the few factories in the world still manufacturing vitroceramic cookware. One of the benefits of modern Pyroceram production is the ability to manufacture cookware without the use of arsenic.

In early 2022, sales of Pyroceram-based CorningWare were temporarily discontinued in the USA but reappeared on the market in early 2023. It continues to be sold in other regions of the world.

== Patterns and products ==
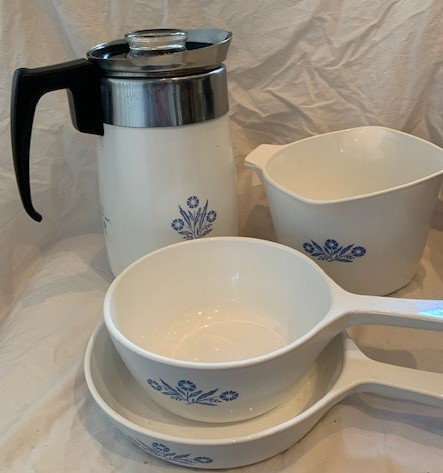
CorningWare coffee percolator; saucemaker (background); saucepan, skillet (foreground)

The first pattern produced was Wheat; it was test marketed in 1958. It didn't test well with potential customers, and was dropped in favor of Blue Cornflower. Designed by Joseph Baum, an artist at the Charles Brunelle Advertising Agency in Hartford, Connecticut, the Blue Cornflower pattern became the trademark of Corning consumer products for three decades. Dozens of additional styles have also been offered, such as 'Floral Bouquet', 'Spice O' Life', 'French White', and "Shadow Iris".

Currently, Pyroceram-based Corning Ware is popular in the Asia–Pacific region. Additional patterns have been created specifically for this market, including Bliss, Blue Elegance, Cool Pansies, Country Rose, Dainty Flora, Dandy Blossoms, Elegant City, European Herbs, Herb Country, Lilyville, Lush, Petite Trio, Plum, Salad Seasons and Warm Pansies among others.

The lids of CorningWare are typically made of Pyrex. Though some early lids were made of Pyroceram, most subsequent covers have been made of borosilicate or tempered soda-lime glass. Unlike the cookware, these lids have a lower tolerance for thermal shock and cannot be used under direct heat.

More than 750 million pieces of Corning Ware's range/oven-to-table service have been manufactured since its inception. A partial product list includes: browning skillets, cake pans, casserole dishes, coffee pots (percolator, drip), dinner service (Centura by Corning), Dutch ovens, frying pans, Grab-it bowls, loaf pans, percolators, pie plates, ramekins, restaurant ware (Pyroceram), roasters, saucepans, skillets, soufflé dishes, and teapots.

== Related products ==
Corelle Brands (and later, Instant Brands) sells similar looking products under the CorningWare brand name that are made of glazed stoneware, rather than Pyroceram. The packaging for this type of CorningWare bakeware specifically states that they are not for stovetop use.

Visions, a brand of transparent stove top cookware originally created by Corning France and still being produced today, is made of a transparent version of Pyroceram. It features thermal traits very similar to CorningWare plus improved resistance to staining and the detrimental effects of acids and detergents.

Corelle, a brand name for break-resistant glass dishware also originally created by Corning Glass Works, has offered matching designs to many CorningWare patterns. Care must be made to distinguish between Corning Ware cookware and tableware marketed under the Corelle and Pyrex brand names, as the thermal properties of the products are quite different.

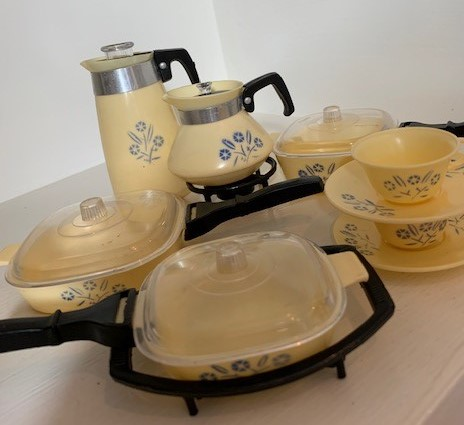
Miniature toy set of CorningWare

Arc International, France, sells cookware that is equivalent to Corning Ware under various brand names including Arcoflam, Luminarc, and Arcoroc. Their Octime line of glass-ceramic saucepans and casseroles were rebadged for Princess House and sold as Nouveau cookware in the US and other select regions. Some of Arc's white vitroceramic cookware has also been sold under the Corning Ware brand name.

== Other collectible cookware ==
- Cousances
- Descoware
- Druware
- Le Creuset
