= Crystallinity =

Degree of structural order in a solid

Crystallinity refers to the degree of structural order in a solid. In a crystal, the atoms or molecules are arranged in a regular, periodic manner. The degree of crystallinity has a large influence on hardness, density, transparency and diffusion. In an ideal gas, the relative positions of the atoms or molecules are completely random. Amorphous materials, such as liquids and glasses, represent an intermediate case, having order over short distances (a few atomic or molecular spacings) but not over longer distances.

Many materials, such as glass-ceramics and some polymers, can be prepared in such a way as to produce a mixture of crystalline and amorphous regions. In such cases, crystallinity is usually specified as a percentage of the volume of the material that is crystalline. Even within materials that are completely crystalline, however, the degree of structural perfection can vary.

For instance, most metallic alloys are crystalline, but they usually comprise many independent crystalline regions (grains or crystallites) in various orientations separated by grain boundaries; furthermore, they contain other crystallographic defects (notably dislocations) that reduce the degree of structural perfection. The most highly perfect crystals are silicon boules produced for semiconductor electronics; these are large single crystals (so they have no grain boundaries), are nearly free of dislocations, and have precisely controlled concentrations of defect atoms.

Crystallinity can be measured using x-ray diffraction, but calorimetric techniques are also commonly used.

== Use in geochemistry ==
In geochemistry, mineral crystallinity plays a pivotal role in regulating water-rock interactions, particularly during the early stages of mineral crystallization. For example, in the case of goethite, dissolved lithium can be taken up by poorly crystallized goethite, whereas little sorption occurs in well-crystallized goethite. Additionally, lithium isotope fractionation during low-temperature water-rock interactions is controlled by reactions occurring at defect sites in poorly crystallized minerals, such as hectorite and goethite.

== Rock crystallinity ==
Geologists describe four qualitative levels of crystallinity:

- holocrystalline rocks are completely crystalline;
- hypocrystalline rocks are partially crystalline, with crystals embedded in an amorphous or glassy matrix;
- hypohyaline rocks are partially glassy;
- holohyaline rocks (such as obsidian) are completely glassy.
