= Induction cooking =

Direct induction heating of cooking vessels

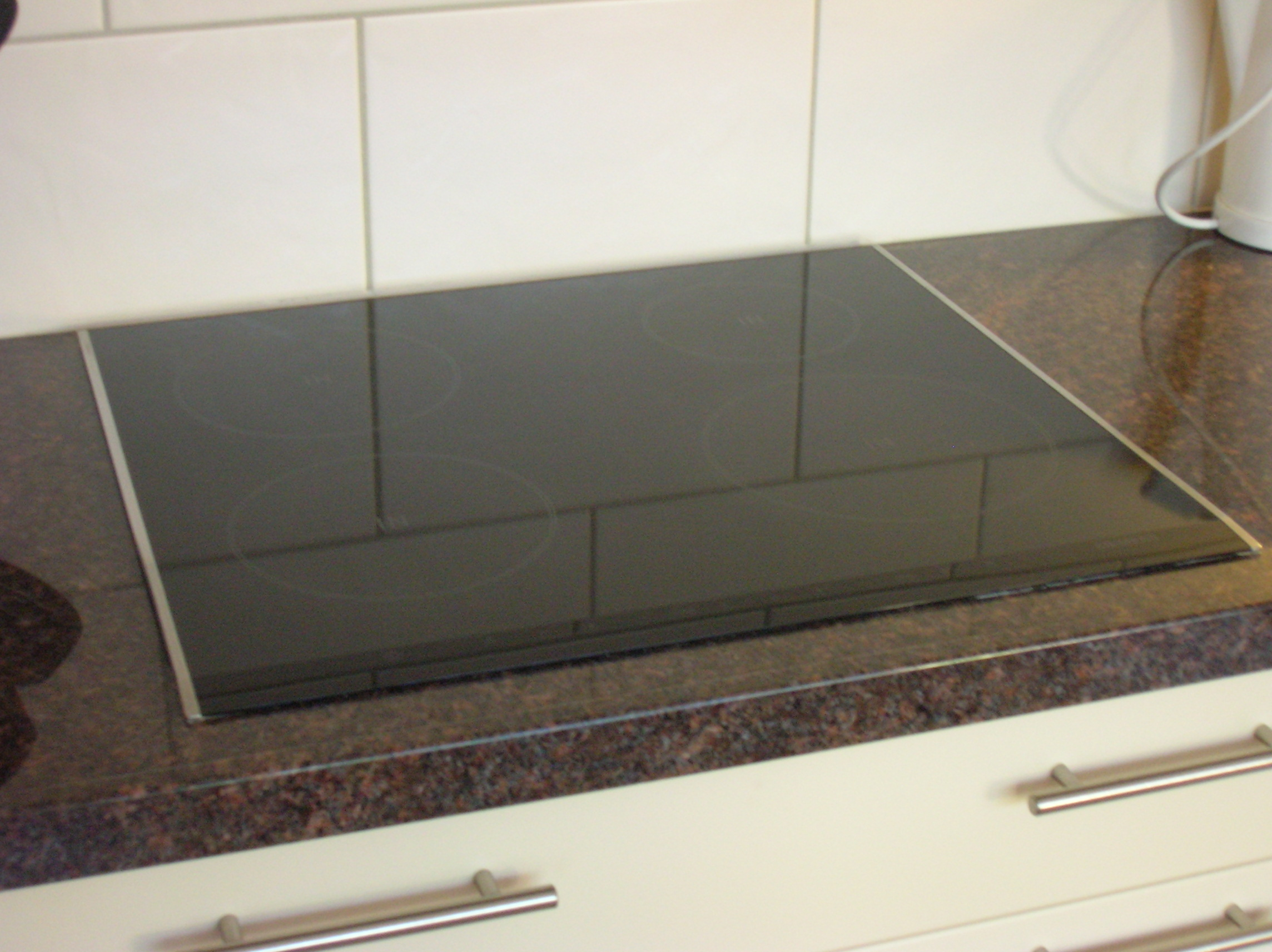
Top view of an induction cooktop

Induction cooking is a cooking process using direct electrical induction heating of cookware, rather than relying on flames or heating elements. Induction cooking allows high power and very rapid increases in temperature to be achieved: changes in heat settings are instantaneous.

An induction electric stove (also induction hob or induction cooktop) generally has a heat-resistant glass-ceramic surface. Below each cooking position there is a coil of copper wire with an alternating electric current passing through it. The resulting oscillating magnetic field induces an electrical current in the metal bottom of the cookware, which produces heat by flowing through resistance. Typically, cookware must contain a ferromagnetic metal such as cast iron or some stainless steels. Induction tops typically will not heat copper or aluminum cookware because the magnetic field cannot produce a concentrated current (see skin effect).

Induction cooking is among the most efficient ways of cooking, which means it produces less waste heat and it can be quickly turned on and off. Some chefs and restaurants have a preference for induction stoves, as their precise settings allow for greater consistency and cooking to exact specifications. Induction has safety advantages compared to gas stoves and emits no air pollution into the kitchen. Cooktops are also usually easy to clean, because the cooktop itself has a smooth surface and does not get very hot. Heavy cookware may scratch the surface if dragged across the cook top surface.

== History ==
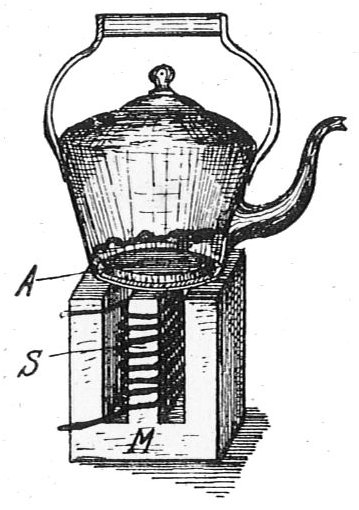
An early induction cooker patent from 1909 illustrates the principle. Current in the coil of wire S induces a magnetic field in the magnetic core M. The magnetic field passes through the bottom of the pot A, inducing eddy currents within it. Unlike this concept, a modern cooking surface uses electronically generated high-frequency current.

The first patents were issued in the early 1900s, Arthur Berry applying for a UK patent in 1906, and Simon Hohlfeld, a German patent in 1909. Demonstration stoves were shown by the Frigidaire division of General Motors in the mid-1950s on a touring showcase. The induction cooker was shown heating a pot of water with a newspaper placed between the stove and the pot, to demonstrate the convenience and safety. This unit was never put into production.

Modern implementations came in the early 1970s, with work done at the Research & Development Center of Westinghouse Electric Corporation. That work was first put on display at the 1971 National Association of Home Builders convention in Houston, Texas, as part of the Westinghouse Consumer Products Division display. The stand-alone single-burner range was named the Cool Top Induction Range. It used parallel Delco Electronics transistors developed for automotive electronic ignition systems to drive the 25 kHz current.

Westinghouse decided to make a few hundred production units to develop the market. Those were named Cool Top 2 (CT2) Induction ranges. The development work was done by a team led by Bill Moreland and Terry Malarkey. The ranges were priced at $1500 (equivalent to $11,900 in 2025), including a set of high quality cookware made of Quadraply, a new laminate of stainless steel, carbon steel, aluminum and another layer of stainless steel (outside to inside). Production began in 1973 and stopped in 1975.

CT2 had four "burners" of about 1,600 watts each. The surface was a Pyroceram ceramic sheet surrounded by a stainless-steel bezel, upon which four magnetic sliders adjusted four corresponding potentiometers below. That design, using no through-holes, made the range impervious to spills. The electronics section was made of four identical modules cooled by a single quiet, low-speed, high-torque fan.

In each of the electronics modules, the 240 V, 60 Hz domestic line power was converted to between 20 and 200 V of continuously variable DC by a phase-controlled rectifier, which was then converted to 27 kHz 30 A (peak) AC by two arrays of six paralleled Motorola automotive-ignition transistors in a half-bridge configuration driving a series-resonant LC oscillator, of which the inductor component was the induction-heating coil and its load, the cooking pan. The circuit design successfully dealt with overload problems.

Control electronics included functions such as protection against over-heated pans and overloads. Provision was made to reduce radiated electrical and magnetic fields. Magnetic pan detection was provided.

CT2 was UL Listed and received Federal Communications Commission (FCC) approval, both firsts. Numerous patents were issued. CT2 won several awards, including Industrial Research Magazine's IR-100 1972 best-product award and a citation from the United States Steel Association. Raymond Baxter demonstrated the CT2 on the BBC TV series Tomorrow's World. He showed how the CT2 could cook through a slab of ice.

Sears Kenmore sold a free-standing oven/stove with four induction-cooking surfaces in the mid-1980s (Model Number 103.9647910). The unit also had a self-cleaning oven, solid-state kitchen timer and capacitive-touch control buttons, advanced for the time. The units were more expensive than standard cooking surfaces.

In 2009 Panasonic developed an all-metal induction cooker that used frequencies up to 120 kHz, three to five times higher than other cooktops, to work with non-ferrous metal cookware.

== Theory ==
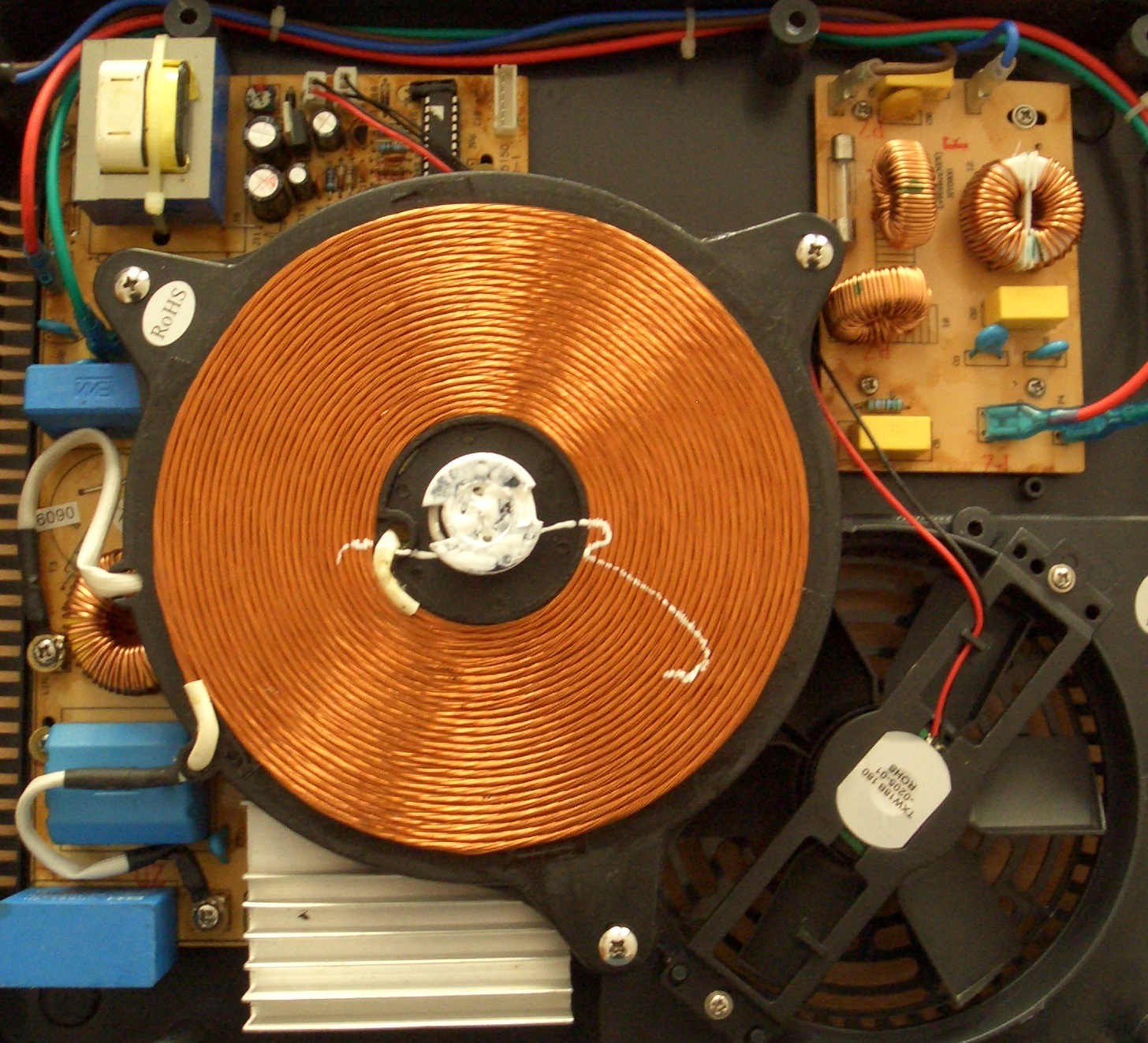
Inside view of an induction cooker: the large copper coil forms the magnetic field, a cooling fan is visible below it, and power supply and line filter surround the coil. In the centre of the coil is a temperature sensor, covered in white thermal grease.

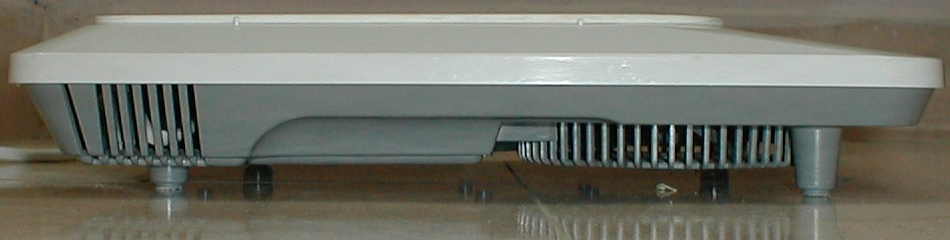
Side view of an induction cooktop

An induction cooker wirelessly transfers electrical energy by induction from a coil of wire into a metal vessel. The coil is mounted under the cooking surface, and a low-radio-frequency (typically ~25–50 kHz) alternating current is passed through it. The current in the coil creates a dynamic electromagnetic field which is strongly magnetic. When a suitable electrically conductive pot is brought close to the cooking surface, the oscillating field induces large eddy currents in the pot. The coil has many turns, while the bottom of the pot effectively forms a single shorted turn. This forms a transformer that steps down the voltage and steps up the current. This large current flowing through the base of the pot produces heat through Joule heating; the cookware then in turn heats its contents by heat conduction.

For high efficiency, electrical resistance should be minimized in the coil and maximized in the pan to allow most of the heat to develop in the pan.

At the frequencies typically used in induction cooking, currents flow mostly on the outside of conductors (the skin effect). Reducing the skin effect in the coil reduces its resistance and the heat wasted in the coil. Therefore, the coil is made from litz wire, which is a bundle of many smaller insulated wires woven together in parallel. Litz wire reduces skin effect, and coil resistance, so that the coil stays cool. Conversely, increased skin effect in the cookware results in more efficient coupling, which is one of the factors making ferrous materials preferable.

== Features ==
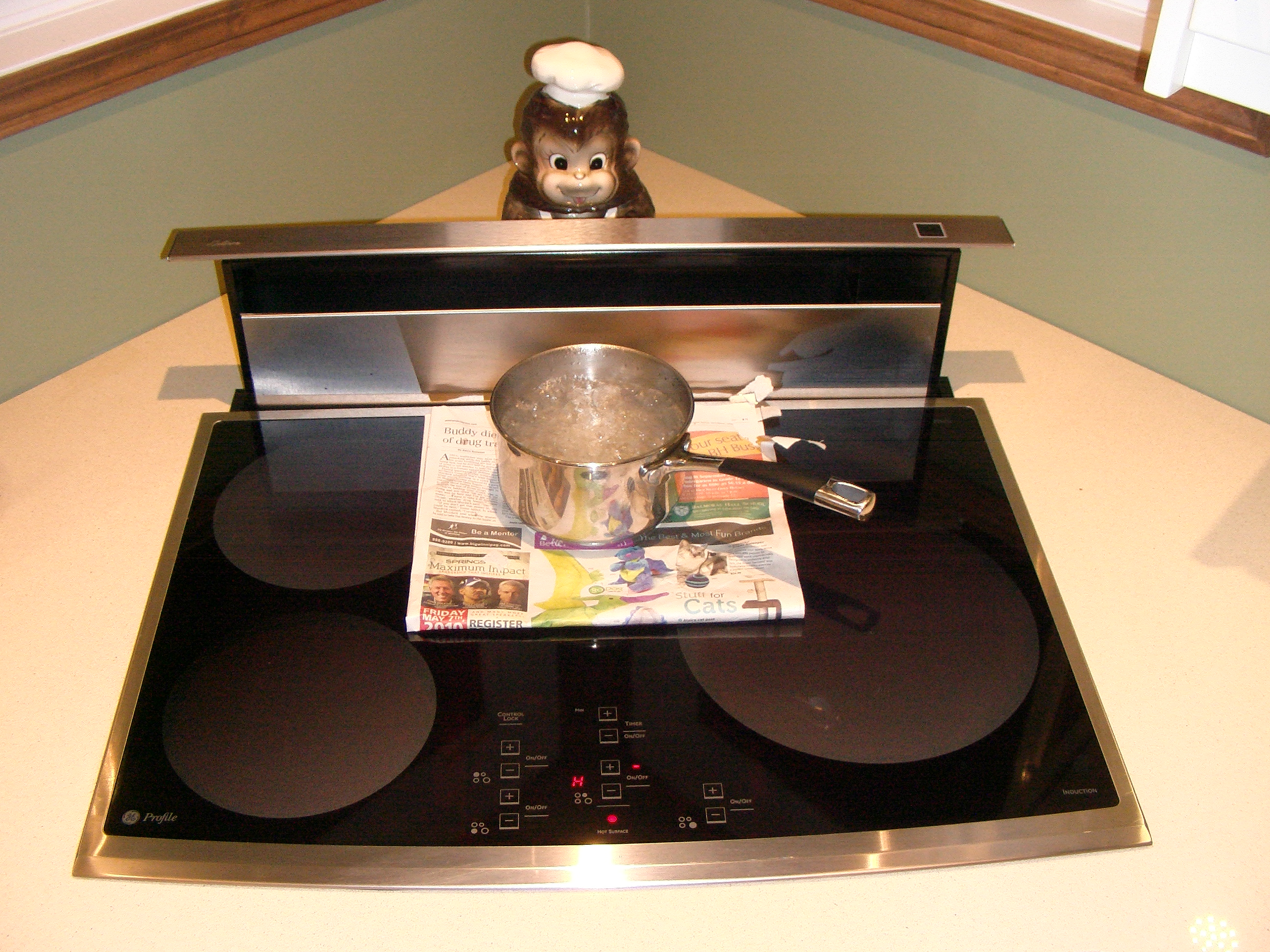
Inductive cooking's heat is produced almost entirely in the cookware's material, rather than in the cooktop or any material in-between (such as the newspaper in this demo).

Induction cooking provides fast heating, improved thermal efficiency, and more consistent heating than cooking by thermal conduction. Generally, the higher the power rating, the faster the cooking time. Induction cooktop power ratings are generally quoted for power delivered to the pan, whereas gas ratings are specified in terms of gas use, but gas is much less efficient. In practice, induction cook zones commonly have heating performance more comparable to a commercial gas burner than domestic burners. Often a thermostat is present to measure the temperature of the pan. This helps prevent the pan from severely overheating if accidentally heated empty or boiled dry, but some models can allow the induction cooker to maintain a target temperature.

Induction cooker tops are generally a low-thermal expansion glass-ceramic. The surface of the cooker is heated only by the pot and so does not usually reach a high temperature. The thermal conductivity of glass ceramics is poor so the heat does not spread far. Induction cookers are easy to clean because the cooking surface is flat and smooth and does not usually get hot enough to make spilled food burn and stick. The surface is brittle and can be damaged by sufficient impact although they must meet specified impact standards.

Noise is generated by an internal cooling fan. Electromagnetically induced acoustic noise and vibration (a high-pitched hum or buzz) may be produced, especially at high power, if the cookware has loose parts or if the layers of the pot are not well bonded to each other; cookware with welded-in cladding layers and solid riveting is less likely to produce this type of noise. Some users are more capable of hearing (or more sensitive to) this high-frequency sound.

Some cooking techniques available when cooking over a flame are not applicable. Persons with artificial pacemakers or other electronic medical implants are usually instructed to avoid sources of magnetic fields. Radio receivers near the induction-cooking unit may pick up some electromagnetic interference.

Energy lost from gas cooking heats the kitchen, whereas with induction cooking, energy losses are much lower. This results in less heating of the kitchen and reduces the required amount of ventilation. Gas stoves are a significant source of indoor air pollution. Gas cooking efficiencies are lower once waste heat generation is taken into account. Especially in restaurants, gas cooking can significantly increase air temperature in localized areas. Extra cooling and zoned venting may be needed to adequately condition hot areas without overcooling other areas. In a commercial setting, induction cookers do not require safety interlocks between the fuel source and the ventilation, as may be required with gas systems.

Some units have touch-sensitive controls. Some have a memory setting, one per element, to control the time that heat is applied. At least one manufacturer makes a "zoneless" induction cooking surface with multiple induction coils. This allows up to five pots to be used at once anywhere on the cooking surface, rather than in pre-defined spots.

== Cookware ==
Cookware may carry a symbol that identifies it as compatible with an induction cooktop.

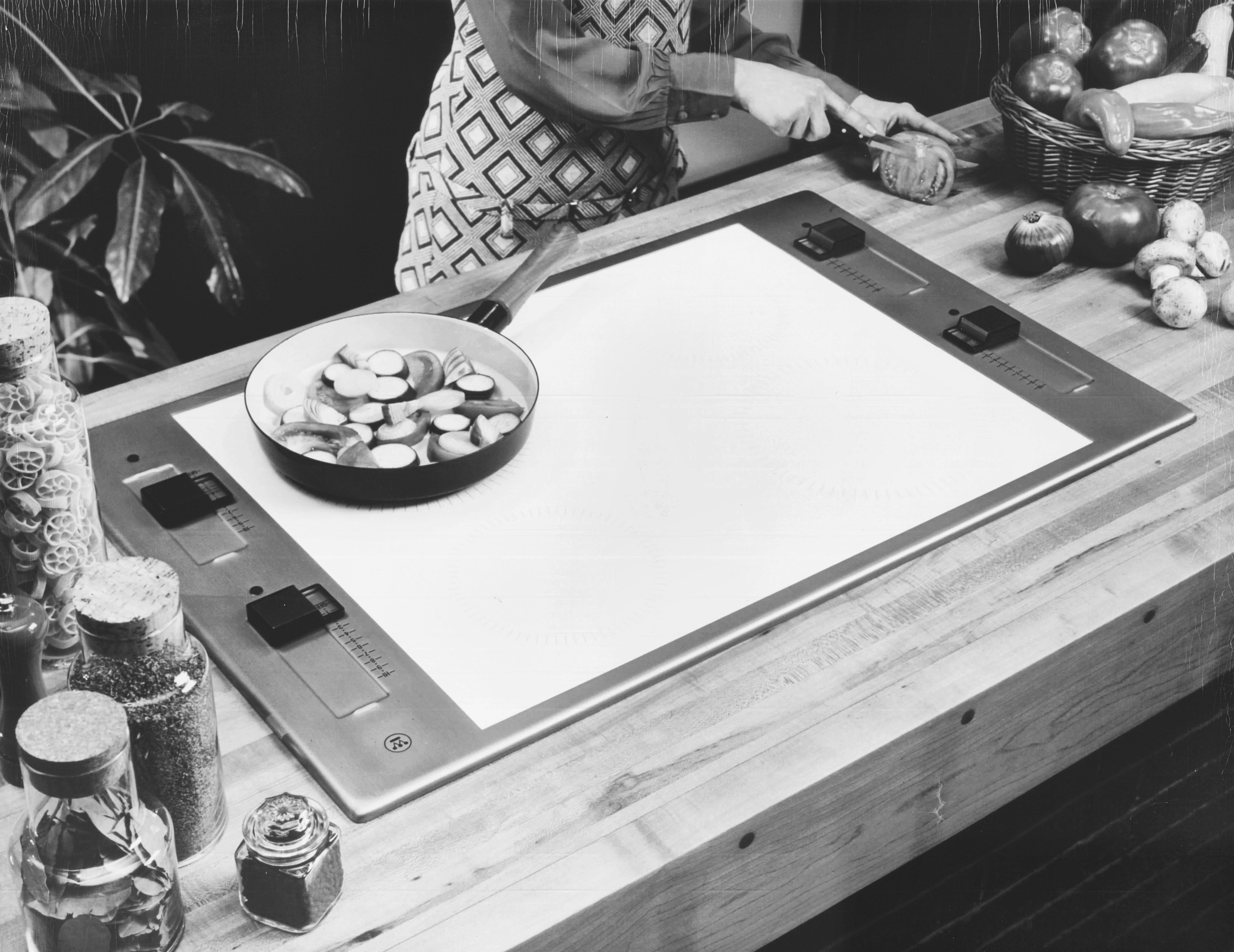
Cool Top 2 (CT2) by Westinghouse 1972

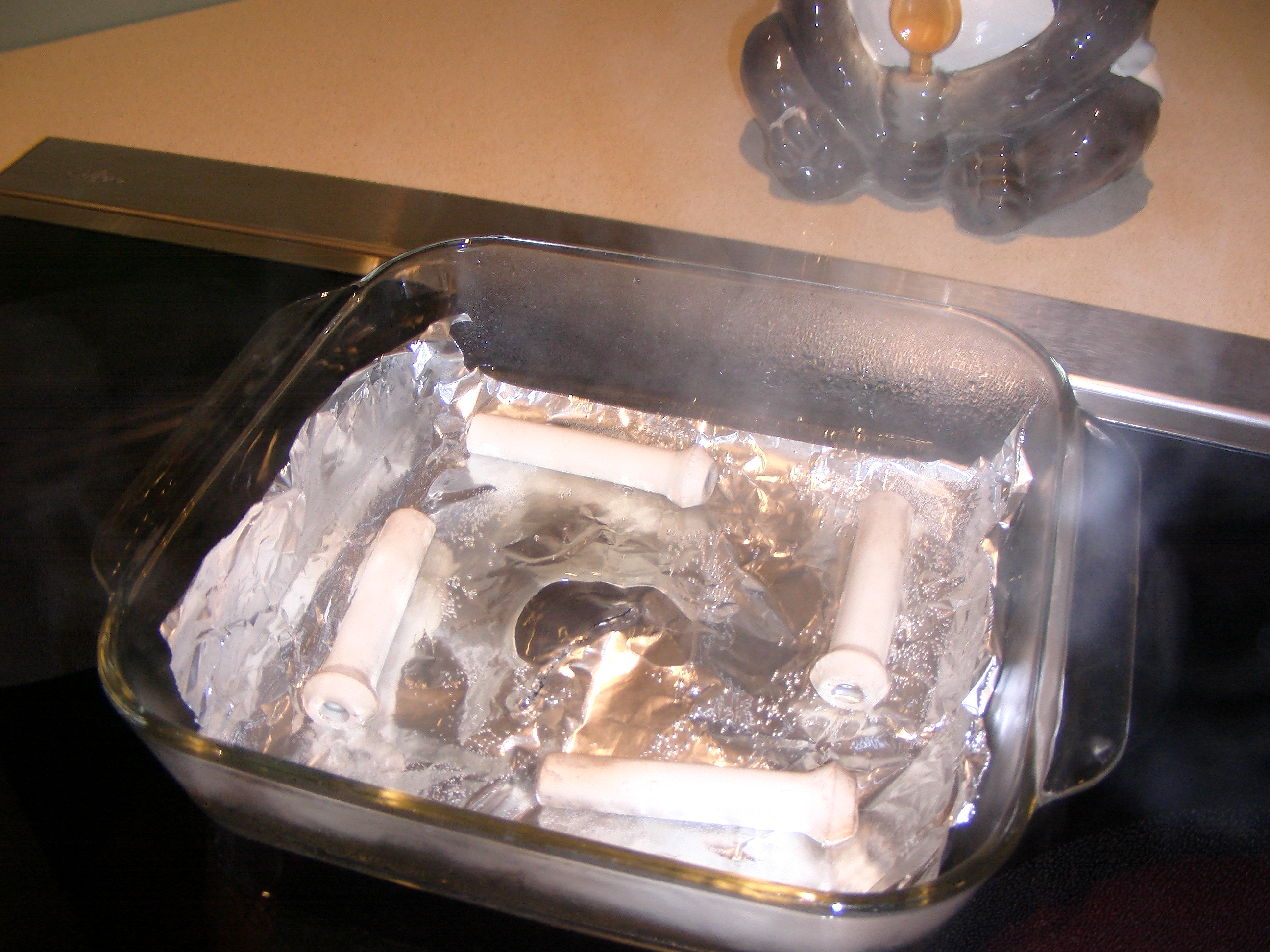
Household foil is much thinner than the skin depth in aluminum at the frequencies used by an induction cooker. Here the foil has melted where it was exposed to the air after steam formed under it. Cooking surface manufacturers prohibit the use of aluminum foil in contact with an induction cooking surface.

Cookware must be compatible with induction heating; generally, only ferrous metal can be heated. Cookware should have a flat bottom since the magnetic field strength (heating power) drops rapidly with distance from the surface. (Wok-shaped cooktops are available for use with round-bottom woks.) Induction disks are metal plates that are heated by induction and heat non-ferrous pots by thermal contact, but these are much less efficient than ferrous cooking vessels.

Induction-compatible cookware can nearly always be used on other stoves. Some cookware or packaging is marked with symbols to indicate compatibility with induction, gas, or electric heat. Induction cooking surfaces work well with any pans with a high ferrous metal content at the base. Cast iron pans and any black metal or iron pans are compatible. Stainless steel pans are compatible if the base of the pan is a magnetic grade of stainless steel. If a magnet sticks well to the bottom of the pan, it is compatible. Non-ferrous cookware is compatible with "all-metal" cookers.

Aluminum and copper are desirable in cookware, since they conduct heat well. Because of this, 'tri-ply' pans often have an induction-compatible skin of stainless steel containing a layer of thermally conductive aluminum.

For frying, a pan base must be a good heat conductor to spread heat quickly and evenly. The sole of the pan will be either a steel plate pressed into aluminum, or a layer of stainless steel over the aluminum. Aluminum's high thermal conductivity makes the temperature more uniform across the pan. Stainless frying pans with an aluminum base do not have the same temperature at their sides as an aluminum sided pan. Cast iron frying pans work well with induction cooking surfaces, although the material is not as good a thermal conductor as aluminum.

When boiling water, the water circulates, spreading the heat and preventing hot spots. For products such as sauces, it is important that at least the base of the pan incorporates a good heat conducting material to spread the heat evenly. For delicate products such as thick sauces, a pan with aluminum throughout is better, since the heat flows up the sides through the aluminum, evenly heating the sauce.

For induction cooking, the base of a suitable vessel is typically made of a steel or iron. These ferromagnetic materials have a high magnetic permeability which greatly decreases the skin depth, concentrating the current in a very thin layer at the surface of the metal bottom of the pan. This makes the electrical resistance in the pan relatively high, efficiently heating the pan.

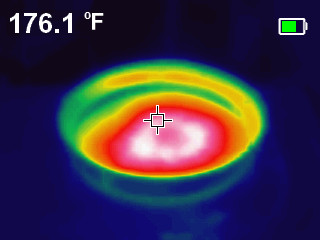
Thermal image of a 4 quart saucepan heating water using induction.

However, for non-ferrous metals, such as aluminum, the skin depth in the pans with typical induction cooktops is too large, and thus efficiency with a standard induction cooker is poor: the resistive heating in the coil and pan are similar. This could damage the cooktop, which detects it and rejects the pan (see section titled, Safety, below).

The heat that can be produced in a pot is a function of the surface resistance. A higher surface resistance produces more heat for similar currents. This is a “figure of merit” that can be used to rank the suitability of a material for induction heating. The surface resistance in a thick metal conductor is proportional to the resistivity divided by the skin depth. Where the thickness is less than the skin depth, the actual thickness can be used to calculate surface resistance.

Skin depth at 24 kHz
Material	Resistivity; (10^{−6} Ω⋅m)	Relative permeability	Skin depth (in)	Skin depth (mm)	Surface resistance; 10^{−3} Ω/sq; (thick material)	Surface resistance; (relative to copper)
Carbon steel 1010	0.23	200	0.004	0.10	2.25	56.25
Stainless steel 432	0.622	200	0.007	0.18	3.5	87.5
Stainless steel 304	0.74	1	0.112	2.8	0.26	6.5
Titanium	0.41	1	0.08	2.0	0.2	5
Aluminum	0.0285	1	0.022	0.56	0.051	1.28
Copper	0.00173	1	0.017	0.43	0.04	1

For some materials, the thickness of a cooking pot can be less than the skin depth, increasing efficiency. For example, typical titanium camping cookware has a thickness (typically around 0.5 mm (0.020 in)) around 4 times less than its skin depth at 24 kHz, increasing its efficiency by that factor compared to thick titanium. Less practically, a piece of aluminium foil is typically around 35 times thinner than aluminium's skin depth, so will heat efficiently (and melt quickly).

To get the same surface resistance with copper as with carbon steel would require the metal to be thinner than is practical for a cooking vessel; at 24 kHz a copper vessel bottom would need to be 1/56th the skin depth of carbon steel. Since the skin depth is inversely proportional to the square root of the frequency, this suggests that much higher frequencies would be required to obtain equivalent heating in a copper pot as in an iron pot at 24 kHz. Such high frequencies are not feasible with inexpensive power semiconductors. In 1973 the silicon-controlled rectifiers used were limited to no more than 40 kHz. Even a thin layer of copper on the bottom of a steel cooking vessel will shield the steel from the magnetic field and make it unusable for an induction top. In ferrous materials some additional heat is created by hysteresis losses, but this creates less than ten percent of the total heat generated.

New types of power semiconductors and low-loss coil designs have made an all-metal cooker possible which can be used with any metal pot or pan even if not designed for induction. In 2009 Panasonic developed a consumer induction cooker that uses a higher-frequency magnetic field of 60 kHz or higher, and a different oscillator circuit design, to allow use with non-ferrous metals as well, including aluminum, multilayer and copper pots and pans. In 2017 Panasonic released a single-burner counter top "all metal" unit, using their trade name "Met-All", aimed at commercial kitchens.

== Efficiency ==
Induction cooking is generally among the most efficient cooking methods. Induction cookers are much more efficient than gas cookers, which lose significant energy to heating the air rather than the pan. They can also be more efficient than an electric plate cooktop, inasmuch as induction directly heats the pan instead of indirectly via a heating element.

In 2014, ACEEE Summer Study on Energy Efficiency in Buildings tested different methods of cooking on full-size kitchen ranges. The greatest difference in efficiency between induction and electric plate was when the pan was smaller than the hob size, i.e. the size of the heating element. For induction, the efficiency of heating water is roughly 76%, whether it is tested with a small or larger pan. For electric coil cooktops, efficiency drops from over 80% for large pans to 40%–50% for smaller pans. For gas, the efficiency drops from around 35%–40% to 30%.

A 2023 study of cooktop devices showed that, for bringing water to a boil, electric kettles were the most efficient, with induction coming second. This was followed by resistance coils and infrared devices; Electric plate scored lowest. The efficiency of the induction hob ranged between 54% and 81%, depending on the volume of water to be heated. However, resistance coil was more efficient than induction for simmering food over a one-hour period.

Energy transfer efficiency, as defined by U.S. Department of Energy (DOE), is the percentage of the energy consumed by a cooker that, at the end of a simulated cooking cycle has been transferred as heat to a standardized metal test block. The DOE test cycle starts with both the block and the cooktop at 77 ± 9 °F (25 ± 5 °C). The cooktop is then switched to maximum heating power. When the test block temperature reaches 144 °F (62 °C) above the initial room temperature, the cooktop power is immediately reduced to 25%±5% of its maximum power for 15 minutes, after which the heat in the test block is measured.

In 2013 and 2014 DOE developed new test procedures to allow direct comparison of energy transfer efficiency among induction, electric resistance, and gas cooking tops and ranges. The procedures use a test block made of aluminum and stainless steel. For comparable (large) cooking elements the following efficiencies were measured: 70.7%–73.6%, 71.9% for electric coil, 43.9% for gas. DOE noted that the 84% induction efficiency, cited in previous Technical Support Documents, was not measured by DOE laboratories, but just "referenced from an external test study" performed in 1992.

Independent manufacturers tests and other subjects seem to demonstrate that actual induction cooking efficiencies usually stay between 74% and 77% and occasionally reach 81% (although these tests may follow different procedures). For comparison and in agreement with DOE findings, cooking with gas has an average energy efficiency of about 40%.

When comparing with gas, the relative cost of electrical and gas energy, and the efficiency of electricity generation affect overall environmental efficiency and user cost.

== Safety ==
The pan is insulated by the cooking surface, and voltages generated in the pan are far too low to represent a shock hazard. The cooktop can detect whether cookware is present by monitoring power delivered. As with other electric ceramic cooking surfaces, a maximum pan size may be specified by the manufacturer, and a minimum size is also stated. The control system shuts down the element if a pot is not present or not large enough. If a pan boils dry it can get extremely hot – a thermostat in the surface will turn off the power if it senses overheating to prevent cooker failures and potential fires.

== Applications ==
Induction equipment may be a built-in surface, part of a range, or a standalone unit. Built-in and rangetop units typically have multiple elements, the equivalent of multiple burners on a gas-fueled range. Stand-alone induction modules are typically single-or dual-element. All such elements share an electromagnet sealed beneath a heat-resisting glass-ceramic sheet. The pot is placed on the ceramic glass surface and heats its contents.

Asian manufacturers have taken the lead in producing inexpensive single-induction-zone surfaces. In Japan, some models of rice cookers are powered by induction. Induction cookers are less frequently used in other parts of the world.

Induction ranges may be applicable in commercial restaurant kitchens, with lower installation, ventilation and fire suppression equipment costs. Drawbacks for commercial use include possible breakages of the glass cook-top, higher initial cost and the requirement for magnetic cookware.

== Manufacturers ==
In the United States, as of early 2013 over five dozen brands offered induction-cooking equipment, including both built-in and countertop residential equipment and commercial-grade equipment. Over two dozen brands offer built-in residential-use units; residential countertop units are offered by two-dozen-plus brands. The National Association of Home Builders in 2012 estimated that, in the United States, induction cooktops represented only 4% of sales, compared to gas and other electric cooktops. The global induction cooktops market was estimated at $9.16 billion in value during 2015 (equivalent to $12.44 billion in 2025). In April 2010, The New York Times reported that "In an independent survey [in 2009] by the market research company Mintel of 2,000 Internet users who own appliances, only 5 percent of respondents said they had an induction range or cooktop. Still, 22 percent of the people Mintel surveyed in connection to their study [in 2009] said their next range or cooktop would be induction."

== See also ==
- Electrodeless lamp – Gas-discharge lamp using induction to excite the gas inside
- Glass-ceramic – Translucent polycrystalline solid
- Microwave oven – Kitchen cooking appliance
- Safety lock – Lock to prevent children from accessing dangerous items
- Timer – Clock for measuring time duration
