= Visions (cookware) =

Brand of transparent stove top cookware

Visions is a brand of transparent stove top cookware created by Corning France and introduced to Europe during the late 1970s. In 1983, it was introduced in the United States and became the number one selling cookware set for a number of years. Visions is made of a transparent material belonging to the Pyroceram family of glass-ceramics. It is one of the few cookware lines that can be used on the range (gas and electric), in the oven (conventional, convection, and microwave), and under a broiler. It will withstand heat up to 850 °C (1,560 °F) with thermal traits similar to Corning Ware plus improved resistance to staining and the detrimental effects of acids and detergents. Visions is sold worldwide by Corelle Brands.

== History ==
In 1953 S. Donald Stookey of the Corning Research and Development Division discovered Pyroceram, an opaque-white glass-ceramic material with a high thermal shock resistance. Included in his subsequent patents were references to a transparent variation of this material. While Pyroceram went on to be used for a variety of products, including Corning Ware cookware, the transparent version was also heavily studied for potential use as cookware over the next two decades.

In 1963 George Beall, working under Stookey, explored a method for making the transparent cookware. However, by 1966, Corning decided against commercializing it for fear that it would cannibalize Pyrex sales.

In 1977, Andre Andrieu and Serge Renault, working for Corning France, patented the claim that would form the basis for amber-tinted, transparent Vision cookware. It was produced in France and released for the European market in 1979 to instant success.

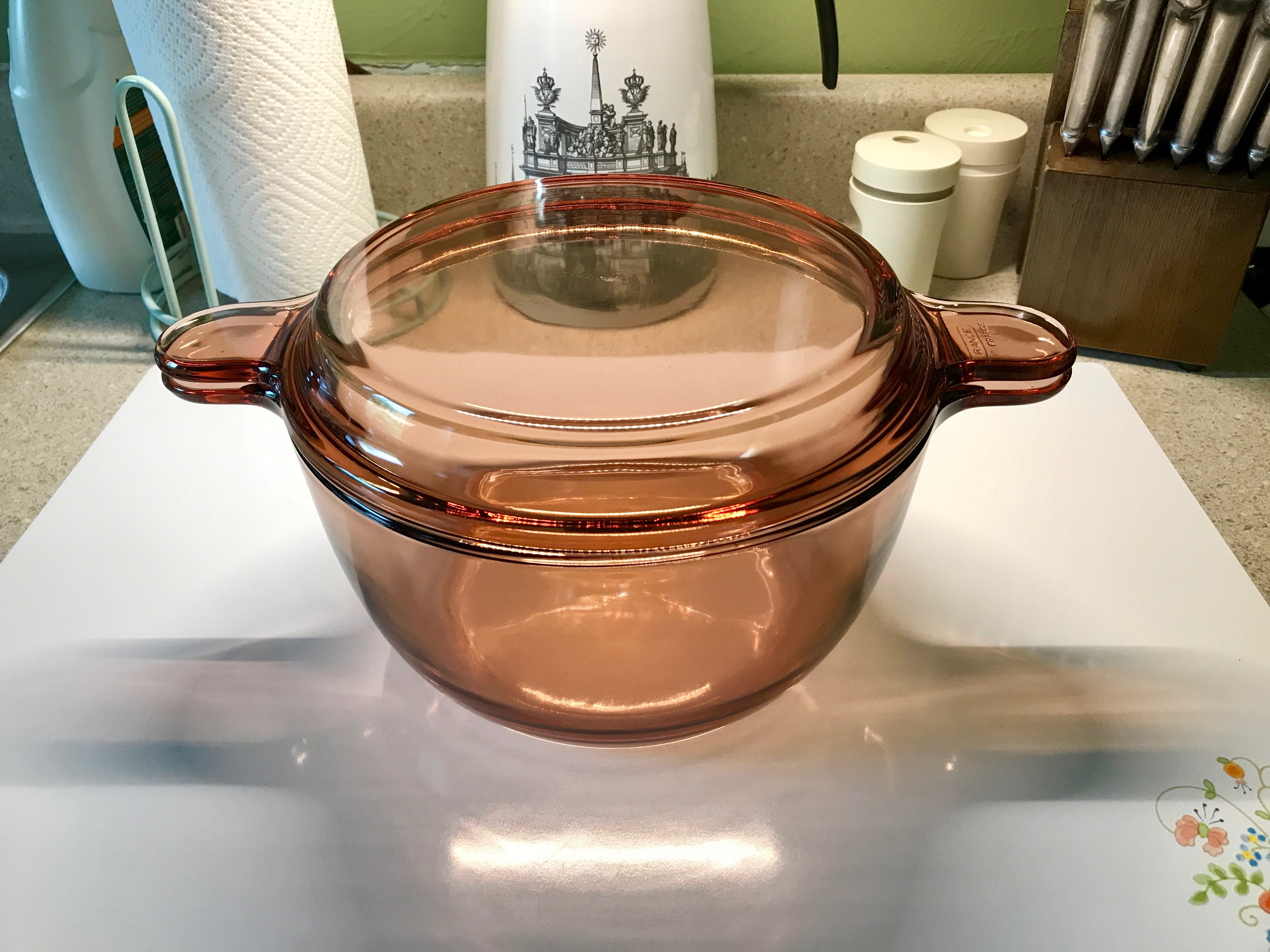
Corning Le CLAIR (VISION) 2.5L Stewpot

In 1981, Corning Glass Works began test marketing the cookware in the United States as an imported product under the name “Le CLAIR” rather than VISION due to a trademark conflict over the name. Once the trademark obstacles were overcome, the product finally received an official rollout in the second half of 1983 under the name “VISIONS”.

Sales spiked during the mid-1980s when Corning released a series of television commercials showing a traditional piece of metal cookware being melted inside a transparent Visions pot, touting the product line as withstanding heat that will "turn ordinary sauce pans into sauce." It would become the number one selling cookware set for the next several years. Due to increased demand, Corning opened additional production lines in the US and Brazil.

During the late 1980s and early 1990s, Corning released additional Visions products lines including limited "Sculptured" versions for high-end dept stores, non-stick versions featuring a Silverstone coating, and additional colors.

Sales declined in the US over the 1990s and early 2000s and the product line is now sold at higher end price points via "CorningWare, Corelle, & More" outlet stores and Corelle Brands websites. Visions has remained popular overseas, particularly in the Asia-Pacific region where custom product lines have been created specifically for that market.

Typically seen in an amber tint, a cranberry colored version was available from 1992 until 2004. A white variation was available in Europe as "White Vision" and in the US in limited supply under the name "Pyromax". Visions was temporarily unavailable in the United States from 2004 until 2006 but has otherwise been produced non-stop for nearly 40 years and is currently sold worldwide by Instant Brands (formerly Corelle Brands, LLC).

== Transparent Pyroceram ==
Visions cookware is made of a transparent, beta-quartz material belonging to the Pyroceram family of glass-ceramics. Transparent Pyroceram was briefly given the name "Calexium" in European marketing materials during the early 1980s. However since then, and in other regions such as the USA, the term "Pyroceram" has been used exclusively. This material and a method of making it was first referenced in a patent filed by S. Donald Stookey, of the Corning Research and Development Division, in 1958. It was described as being a semi-crystalline ceramic having unique and useful properties such as coefficient of thermal expansion so low as to be negative in character, a true porosity of zero, and the unusual characteristic of being transparent despite a substantial crystal content (often greater than 75% by volume). In a further patent, filed in 1976, Kenneth Chyung described it as an ideal material for cookware and kitchen materials and "unquestionably better" in the areas of infra-red transmittance, stain resistance, and chemical durability than two existing Pyroceramic glasses used for Corning Ware and "The Counter That Cooks".

Pyroceram has extremely high thermal shock resistance, which allows food to be stored in the freezer in a piece of Visions and immediately taken to the stovetop or oven for cooking. Since the material is completely non-porous, it will never harbor food odors or leach chemicals into meals. Additionally, it is completely dishwasher safe and is not prone to haze or etching typically experienced with normal glass kitchenware.

When initially released in Europe, and during the Le CLAIR test marketing period in the US, many Visions products shipped with a "Cooking Lid" that was also made of Pyroceram. These lids could be flipped over and used as a skillet or baking pan. However, upon official introduction in the US, releases under the Visions brand made use of knob-style glass lids made of Pyrex. Glass lids are now standard worldwide.

== Related products ==
Corelle Brands (and later, Instant Brands) sells similar functioning cookware under the CorningWare StoveTop brand name. These products are made of opaque Pyroceram ceramic-glass, like vintage pieces of Corning Ware, and can be used in the similar ways as Visions cookware. They are currently manufactured in France by the same factory that produces Visions.

Pyrex, a brand name for break-resistant glass bakeware, has offered complementary brown (Fireside) and Cranberry tinted lines to match Visions colorways in the past. Care must be made to distinguish between Visions and bakeware marketed under the Pyrex brand name, as the thermal properties of each product are quite different.

The transparent version of Pyroceram used to make Visions is also used in other products such as ceramic-glass top stoves and fireplace doors.

Arc International, France, sells cookware that is equivalent to Visions under various brand names including Arcoflam, Luminarc, and Arcoroc. An amber version of their Octime line of glass-ceramic casseroles were rebadged as Visions Octime cookware in the USA during 2010-2011. Since that time, some of Arc's other vitroceramic cookware has also been sold under the Visions brand name, as well.
