= S. Donald Stookey =

American inventor and materials scientist (1915–2014)

- Born: Stanley Donald Stookey; May 23, 1915; Hay Springs, Nebraska, US
- Died: November 4, 2014 (aged 99); Rochester, New York, US
- Education: Coe College; Lafayette College; Massachusetts Institute of Technology
- Known for: Inventor of CorningWare
- Awards: John Price Wetherill Medal (1953); National Medal of Technology by President Ronald Reagan in 1986; National Inventors Hall of Fame, 2010
- Scientific career
- Fields: Materials science
- Workplaces: Corning Glass Works

Stanley Donald Stookey (May 23, 1915 – November 4, 2014) was an American inventor. He had 60 patents in his name related to glass and ceramics (some patents solely his and others shared as joint patents with other inventors). His discoveries and inventions have contributed to the development of ceramics, eyeglasses, sunglasses, cookware, defense systems, and electronics.

He was a research director at Corning Glass Works for 47 years doing R&D in glass and ceramic development. His inventions include Fotoform, CorningWare, Cercor, Pyroceram and Photochromic Ophthalmic glass eyewear.

== Early life, family and education ==
Stookey was born on May 23, 1915, in Hay Springs, Nebraska, the eldest of four children born to Stanley and Hermie Stookey. Stookey’s grandfather, Stephen Stookey, had been a professor of botany and geology at Coe College. Both of his parents were teachers, and his father also worked at some point in time as a bank clerk. When Stookey was about 6 years old, the family moved to Cedar Rapids, Iowa.

From 1934 to 1936, Stookey attended Coe College, graduating with his first degree, a liberal arts degree in chemistry and mathematics, magna cum laude. He subsequently enrolled at Lafayette College in Easton, Pennsylvania, in 1937. He received a $1,000 fellowship to cover living expenses and as a teaching laboratory assistant in the chemistry lab. In 1938, he earned his Master of Science degree in chemistry from Lafayette College. At Massachusetts Institute of Technology in Cambridge, Massachusetts, Stookey earned a doctorate in chemistry in 1940.

== Career ==
Stookey spent his career at Corning Glass Works, from 1940 to 1987. He conducted research on glass and ceramics, which led to several inventions. Stookey studied and experimented with opal glass and glass ceramics.

Corningware, invented by S. Donald Stookey

One of Stookey's earliest innovations was FotoForm glass. The scientific community recognized its value around 1948. FotoForm glass is used in computer manufacturing and communications technology. A serendipitous invention made by Stookey in 1953 was when he took a piece of FotoForm glass and mistakenly heated it to 900 °C when he meant to heat it to 600 °C. When an oven thermometer was stuck on the higher temperature, Stookey had accidentally created the first glass-ceramic, Fotoceram. It was later known also as Pyroceram. This was the first glass-ceramic and eventually led to the development of CorningWare in 1957. CorningWare went to the consumer marketplace the next year in 1958 for cookware by Corning Glass Works and became just one of Stookey's multimillion-dollar inventions. It influenced the development of VisionWare, which is transparent cookware. VisionWare was patented by Corning Glass Works in 1966.

Pyroceramic glass has the necessary properties to be used by the military for the nose cones of supersonic radar domes in guided missiles applied in defense. It has the special properties of extreme hardness, super strength, resistance to high heat and transparency to radar waves. It is the basis for Gorilla Glass, used in iPhones and other LCD screens.

Stookey also developed photochromic glass, used to make ophthalmic lenses that darken in bright light. These lenses were first available to consumers in the 1960s as sunglasses made by Corning Glass Works. It was a joint discovery and development of Stookey with William Armistead. Stookey also invented photosensitive glass using gold in which permanent colored photographs can be produced.

== Timeline ==
- 1950 First of 60 U.S. Patents awarded, No. 2.515.937 for photosensitive glass
- 1953 John Price Wetherill Medal, Franklin Institute
- 1955 Alumni Award of Merit, Coe College
- 1960 Ross Coffin Purdy Award, American Ceramic Society
- 1962 John Price Wetherill Medal, Franklin Institute (2nd time)
- 1963 Honorary doctor of science degree in 1963, Coe College
- 1964 Toledo Glass and Ceramic Award
- 1970 Inventor of the Year, George Washington University
- 1971 Award for Creative Invention, American Chemical Society
- 1971 E.C. Sullivan Award, Corning Section, American Ceramic Society
- 1973 Beverly Myers Achievement Award, Educational Foundation in Ophthalmic Optics
- 1975 American Phoenix Award of the Glass Industry
- 1979 IRI Achievement Award, Industrial Research Institute
- 1982 Samuel Giejsbeek Award, Pacific Coast Sections, ACerS
- 1984 Distinguished Inventor Award, Central New York Patent Law Association
- 1984 Honorary doctor of science degree, Alfred University
- 1985 Published his autobiography, Journey to the Center of the Crystal Ball
- 1986 United States Medal of Technology, presented by President Ronald Reagan
- 1989 Distinguished Life Member, American Ceramic Society
- 1993 Wilhelm Eitel Medallion for Excellence in Silicate Science
- 1994 National Medal of Technology, White House Council
- 2010 Inducted into National Inventors Hall of Fame

== Organization membership ==
Stookey held membership in many professional organizations and societies, including:

- Sigma Xi
- National Academy of Engineering
- British Society of Glass Technology
- American Institute of Chemical Engineers (Fellow)
- The American Ceramic Society (Distinguished Life and Fellow)
- A section on the innovations of glass and glass-ceramics at the Corning Museum of Glass with a Stookey video describing his glass-ceramics inventions.

== Personal life ==
Marrying in 1940, he and his wife Ruth raised three children: Robert, Margaret and Donald Bruce, resulting in six grandchildren and eight great-grandchildren. He died in 2014 at age 99.

== Written works ==
- Stookey, S. Donald (1985). Journey to the Center of the Crystal Ball: An Autobiography. American Ceramic Society. ISBN 978-0916094690.
- Stookey, S. Donald (2000). Explorations in Glass: An Autobiography. Wiley-Blackwell. ISBN 978-1574981247.
