= Wendell Weeks =

American businessman (born 1959/60)

- Born: Wendell P. Weeks; 1959 or 1960 (age 65–66)
- Education: Lehigh University (BS); Harvard University (MBA)
- Occupation: Businessman
- Title: Chairman, CEO, and president, Corning Inc.
- Term: April 2007-
- Spouse: Kim Frock
- Children: 2

Wendell P. Weeks (born 1959/60) is an American business executive who has been the CEO of the American materials technology company Corning Inc. since 2005.

== Education ==
Weeks received a bachelor's degree in accounting and finance from Lehigh University in Bethlehem, Pennsylvania, in 1981, and an MBA from Harvard Business School in 1987.

== Career ==
=== Corning ===
Weeks joined Corning in 1983. He held a variety of financial, business development, commercial, and general management roles, including strategic positions in the company's television, specialty glass, and optical communications businesses.

In 1996, Weeks was named vice president and general manager of Corning's optical fiber business, a tenure which included managing through a major sales downturn.

Weeks has been a director of Corning since December 2000.

He was promoted to chief executive officer in April 2005. A notable action was rapid movement into production of Gorilla Glass, for the new iPhone.

He became chairman in April 2007.

In 2023, Weeks's total compensation from Corning was $15.6 million, or 370 times the median employee pay at Corning for that year.

=== Non-executive roles ===
Weeks is a member of The Business Council and the Business Roundtable and has been a member of the board of directors of Amazon since 2016.

=== Business philosophy ===
Weeks has said that "If you’re going to sustain as an institution, you have to focus on problems that matter. For Corning, some of those things are cleaner air; safer, more effective medicines; and fast, reliable communication. A company’s value is ultimately measured by whether or not it does good in society." He believes that creative destruction is an important part of capitalism, but so is collaboration. He regards failures as opportunities to learn.

== Personal life ==
Weeks met his wife, Kim Frock, at Harvard Business School. She worked at Corning and helped initiate and volunteered with a local school project. They have two children.
