= Glass-ceramic =

Translucent polycrystalline solid

Glass-ceramics are polycrystalline materials produced through controlled crystallization of base glass, producing a fine uniform dispersion of crystals throughout the bulk material. Crystallization is accomplished by subjecting suitable glasses to a carefully regulated heat treatment schedule, resulting in the nucleation and growth of crystal phases. In many cases, the crystallization process can proceed to near completion, but in a small proportion of processes, the residual glass phase often remains.

Glass-ceramic materials share many properties with both glasses and ceramics. Glass-ceramics have an amorphous phase and one or more crystalline phases and are produced by a so-called "controlled crystallization" in contrast to a spontaneous crystallization, which is usually not wanted in glass manufacturing. Glass-ceramics have the fabrication advantage of glass, as well as special properties of ceramics. When used for sealing, some glass-ceramics do not require brazing but can withstand brazing temperatures up to 700 °C.

Glass-ceramics usually have between 30% [m/m] and 90% [m/m] crystallinity and yield an array of materials with interesting properties like zero porosity, high strength, toughness, translucency or opacity, pigmentation, opalescence, low or even negative thermal expansion, high temperature stability, fluorescence, machinability, ferromagnetism, resorbability or high chemical durability, biocompatibility, bioactivity, ion conductivity, superconductivity, isolation capabilities, low dielectric constant and loss, corrosion resistance, high resistivity and break-down voltage. These properties can be tailored by controlling the base-glass composition and by controlled heat treatment/crystallization of base glass. In manufacturing, glass-ceramics are valued for having the strength of ceramic but the hermetic sealing properties of glass.

Glass-ceramics are mostly produced in two steps: First, a glass is formed by a glass-manufacturing process, after which the glass is cooled down. Second, the glass is put through a controlled heat treatment schedule. In this heat treatment the glass partly crystallizes. In most cases nucleation agents are added to the base composition of the glass-ceramic. These nucleation agents aid and control the crystallization process. Because there is usually no pressing and sintering, glass-ceramics have no pores, unlike sintered ceramics.

A wide variety of glass-ceramic systems exist, e.g., the Li_{2}O × Al_{2}O_{3} × nSiO_{2} system (LAS system), the MgO × Al_{2}O_{3} × nSiO_{2} system (MAS system), and the ZnO × Al_{2}O_{3} × nSiO_{2} system (ZAS system).

== History ==
Réaumur, a French chemist, made early attempts to produce polycrystalline materials from glass, demonstrating that if glass bottles were packed into a mixture of sand and gypsum, and subjected to red heat for several days, the glass bottles turned opaque and porcelain-like. Although Réaumur was successful in the conversion of glass to a polycrystalline material, he was unsuccessful in achieving the control of the crystallization process, which is a key step in producing true practical glass ceramics with the improved properties mentioned above.

The discovery of glass-ceramics is credited to a man named Donald Stookey, a renowned glass scientist who worked at Corning Inc. for 47 years. The first iteration stemmed from a glass material, Fotoform, which was also discovered by Stookey while he was searching for a photo-etch-able material to be used in television screens. Soon after the beginning of Fotoform, the first ceramic material was discovered when Stookey overheated a Fotoform plate in a furnace at 900 degrees Celsius and found an opaque, milky-white plate inside the furnace rather than the molten mess that was expected. While examining the new material, which Stookey aptly named Fotoceram, he took note that it was much stronger than the Fotoform that it was created from as it survived a short fall onto concrete.

In the late 1950s two more glass-ceramic materials would be developed by Stookey, one found use as the radome in the nose cone of missiles, while the other led to the line of consumer kitchenware known as Corningware. Corning executives announced Stookey's discovery of the latter "new basic material" called Pyroceram which was touted as light, durable, capable of being an electrical insulator and yet thermally shock resistant. At the time, there were only few materials which offered the specific combination of characteristics that Pyroceram did and the material was rolled out as the Corningware kitchen line August 7, 1958.

Some of the success that Pyroceram brought inspired Corning to put an effort towards strengthening glass which became an effort by the technical director's of Corning titled Project Muscle. A lesser known "ultrastrong" glass-ceramic material developed in 1962 called Chemcor (now known as Gorilla Glass) was produced by Corning's glass team due to the Project Muscle effort. Chemcor would even be used to innovate the Pyroceram line of products as in 1961 Corning launched Centura Ware, a new line of Pyroceram that was lined with a glass laminate (invented by John MacDowell) and treated with the Chemcor process. Stookey continued to forge ahead in the discovery of the properties of glass-ceramics as he discovered how to make the material transparent in 1966. Though Corning would not release a product with his new innovation, for fear of cannibalizing Pyrex sales, until the late 1970s under the name Visions.

== Nucleation and crystal growth ==
The key to engineering a glass-ceramic material is controlling the nucleation and growth of crystals in the base glass. The amount of crystallinity will vary depending on the amount of nuclei present and the time and temperature at which the material is heated. It is important to understand the types of nucleation occurring in the material, whether it is homogeneous or heterogeneous.

Homogeneous nucleation is a process resulting from the inherent thermodynamic instability of a glassy material. When enough thermal energy is applied to the system, the metastable glassy phase begins to return to the lower-energy, crystalline state. The term "homogeneous" is used here because the formation of nuclei comes from the base glass without any second phases or surfaces promoting their formation.

The rate of homogenous nucleation in a condensed system can be described with the following equation, proposed by Becker in 1938.

$$I\ =\ A \exp \left( -\frac{\Delta F^*+Q}{k_BT} \right)$$

Where Q is the activation energy for diffusion across the phase boundary, A is a constant, and $F^*$ is the maximum activation energy for formation of a stable nucleus, as given by the equation below.

$$\Delta F^* = \frac{16 \pi \Delta f_s ^3}{3\Delta f_v ^2}$$

Where $\Delta f_v$ is the change of free energy per unit volume resulting from the transformation from one phase to the other, and $\Delta f_s$ can be equated with interfacial tension.

Heterogeneous nucleation is a term used when a nucleating agent is introduced into the system to aid and control the crystallization process. The presence of this nucleating agent, in the form of an additional phase or surface, can act as a catalyst for nucleation and is particularly effective if there is epitaxy between the nucleus and the substrate. There are a number of metals that can act as nucleating agents in glass because they can exist in the glass in the form of particle dispersion of colloidal dimensions. Examples include copper, metallic silver, and platinum. It was suggested by Stookey in 1959 that the effectiveness of metallic nucleation catalysts relates to the similarities between the crystal structures of the metals and the phase being nucleated.

The most important feature of heterogenous nucleation is that the interfacial tension between the heterogeneity and the nucleated phase is minimized. This means that the influence that the catalyzing surface has on the rate of nucleation is determined by the contact angle at the interface. Based on this, Turnbull and Vonnegut (1952) modified the equation for homogenous nucleation rate to give an expression for heterogenous nucleation rate.

$$I_c\ =\ A^1 \exp \left( -\frac{\Delta F^*\ f(\theta)}{k_BT} \right)$$

If activation energy for diffusion is included, as suggested by Stokey (1959a), the equation then becomes:

$I_c\ =\ A^1 \exp \left( -\frac{\Delta F^*\ f(\theta)+Q}{k_BT} \right)$

From these equations, heterogeneous nucleation can be described in terms of the same parameters as homogeneous nucleation with a shape factor, which is a function of θ (contact angle). The term $f(\theta)$ is given by:

$f(\theta)=\frac{(2+\cos\theta)(1-\cos\theta)^2}{4}$

if the nucleus has the form of a spherical cap.

In addition to nucleation, crystal growth is also required for the formation of glass ceramics. The crystal growth process is of considerable importance in determining the morphology of the produced glass ceramic composite material. Crystal growth is primarily dependent on two factors. First, it is dependent upon the rate at which the disordered structure can be re-arranged into a periodic lattice with longer-range order. Second, it is dependent upon the rate at which energy is released in the phase transformation (essentially the rate of cooling at the interface).

== Glass ceramics in medical applications ==
Glass-ceramics are used in medical applications due to their unique interaction, or lack thereof, with human body tissue. Bioceramics are typically placed into the following groups based on their biocompatibility: biopassive (bioinert), bioactive, or resorbable ceramics.

Biopassive (bioinert) ceramics are, as the name suggests, characterized by the limited interaction the material has with the surrounding biological tissue. Historically, these were the "first generation" biomaterials used as replacements for missing or damaged tissues. One problem resulting from using inert biomaterials was the body's reaction to the foreign object; it was found that a phenomenon known as "fibrous encapsulation" would occur, where tissues would grow around the implant in an attempt to isolate the object from the rest of the body. This occasionally caused a variety of problems such as necrosis or sequestration of the implant. Two commonly used bioinert materials are alumina (Al_{2}O_{3}) and zirconia (ZrO_{2}).

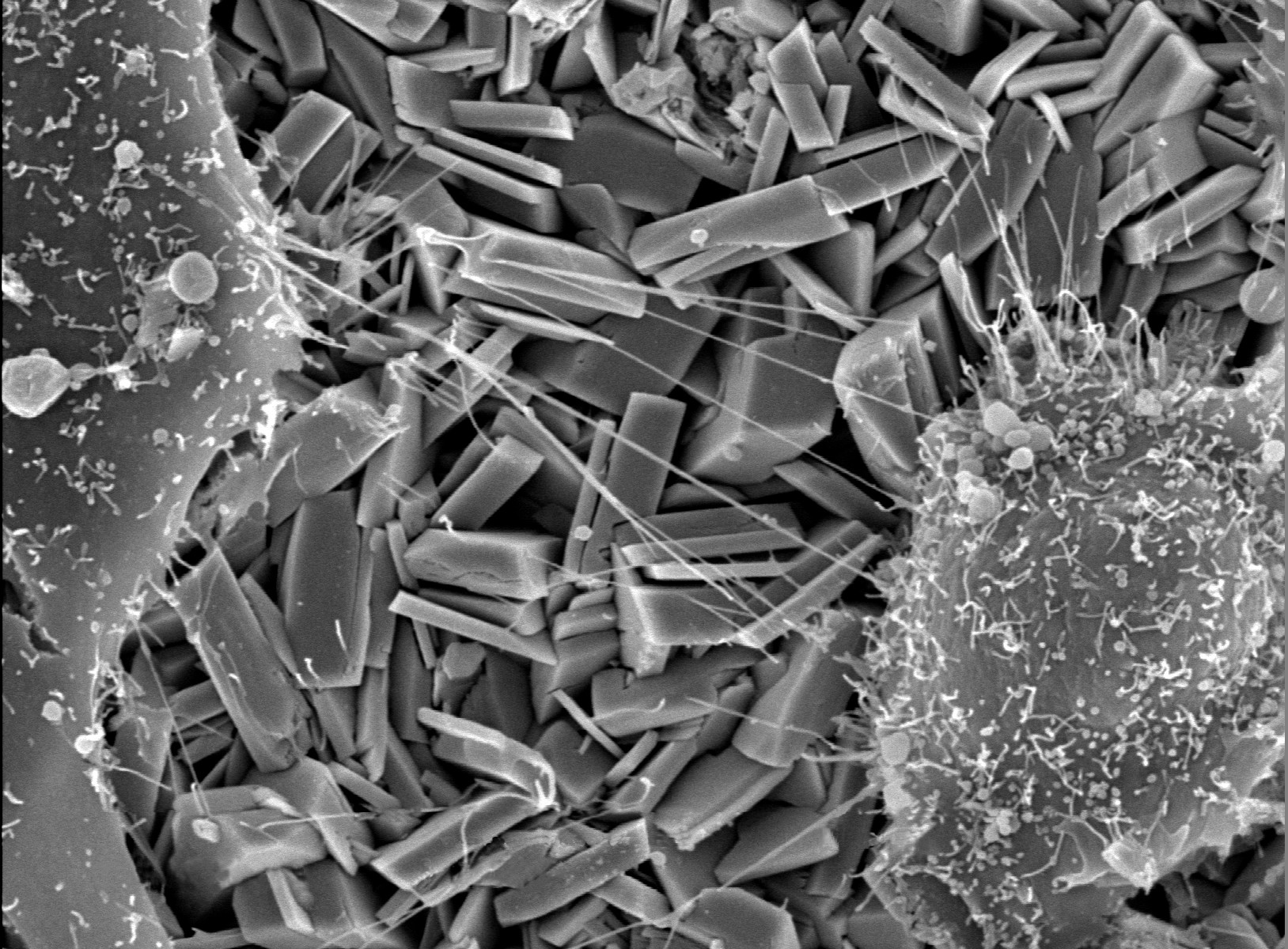
SEM image of two bone-forming osteoblasts crawling over monetite crystals

Bioactive materials have the ability to form bonds and interfaces with natural tissues. In the case of bone implants, two properties known as osteoconduction and osteoinduction play an important role in the success and longevity of the implant. Osteoconduction refers to a material's ability to permit bone growth on the surface and into the pores and channels of the material. Osteoinduction is a term used when a material stimulates existing cells to proliferate, causing new bone to grow independently of the implant. In general, the bioactivity of a material is a result of a chemical reaction, typically dissolution of the implanted material. Calcium phosphate ceramics and bioactive glasses are commonly used as bioactive materials as they exhibit this dissolution behavior when introduced to living body tissue. One engineering goal relating to these materials is that the dissolution rate of the implant be closely matched to the growth rate of new tissue, leading to a state of dynamic equilibrium.

Resorbable ceramics are similar to bioactive ceramics in their interaction with the body, but the main difference lies in the extent to which the dissolution occurs. Resorbable ceramics are intended to gradually dissolve entirely, all the while new tissue grows in its stead. The architecture of these materials has become quite complex, with foam-like scaffolds being introduced to maximize the interfacial area between the implant and body tissue. One issue that arises from using highly porous materials for bioactive/resorbable implants is the low mechanical strength, especially in load-bearing areas such as the bones in the legs. An example of a resorbable material that has seen some success is tricalcium phosphate (TCP), however, it too falls short in terms of mechanical strength when used in high-stress areas.

== LAS system ==
The commercially most important system is the Li_{2}O × Al_{2}O_{3} × nSiO_{2} system (LAS system). The LAS system mainly refers to a mix of lithium, silicon, and aluminum oxides with additional components, e.g., glass-phase-forming agents such as Na_{2}O, K_{2}O and CaO and refining agents. As nucleation agents most commonly zirconium(IV) oxide in combination with titanium(IV) oxide is used. This important system was studied first and intensively by Hummel, and Smoke.

After crystallization the dominant crystal phase in this type of glass-ceramic is a high-quartz solid solution (HQ s.s.). If the glass-ceramic is subjected to a more intense heat treatment, this HQ s.s. transforms into a keatite-solid solution (K s.s., sometimes wrongly named as beta-spodumene). This transition is non-reversible and reconstructive, which means bonds in the crystal-lattice are broken and new arranged. However, these two crystal phases show a very similar structure as Li could show.

An interesting property of these glass-ceramics is their thermomechanical durability. Glass-ceramic from the LAS system is a mechanically strong material and can sustain repeated and quick temperature changes up to 800–1000 °C. The dominant crystalline phase of the LAS glass-ceramics, HQ s.s., has a strong negative coefficient of thermal expansion (CTE), keatite-solid solution also has a negative CTE but much higher than HQ s.s. These negative CTEs of the crystalline phase contrasts with the positive CTE of the residual glass. Adjusting the proportion of these phases offers a wide range of possible CTEs in the finished composite. Mostly for today's applications a low or even zero CTE is desired. Also a negative CTE is possible, which means, in contrast to most materials when heated up, such a glass-ceramic contracts. At a certain point, generally between 60% [m/m] and 80% [m/m] crystallinity, the two coefficients balance such that the glass-ceramic as a whole has a thermal expansion coefficient that is very close to zero. Also, when an interface between material will be subject to thermal fatigue, glass-ceramics can be adjusted to match the coefficient of the material they will be bonded to.

Originally developed for use in the mirrors and mirror mounts of astronomical telescopes, LAS glass-ceramics have become known and entered the domestic market through its use in glass-ceramic cooktops, as well as cookware and bakeware or as high-performance reflectors for digital projectors.

== Ceramic matrix composites ==
One particularly notable use of glass-ceramics is in the processing of ceramic matrix composites. For many ceramic matrix composites typical sintering temperatures and times cannot be used, as the degradation and corrosion of the constituent fibres becomes more of an issue as temperature and sintering time increase. One example of this is SiC fibres, which can start to degrade via pyrolysis at temperatures above 1470K. One solution to this is to use the glassy form of the ceramic as the sintering feedstock rather than the ceramic, as unlike the ceramic the glass pellets have a softening point and will generally flow at much lower pressures and temperatures. This allows the use of less extreme processing parameters, making the production of many new technologically important fibre-matrix combinations by sintering possible.

== Glass ceramics in cooktops ==
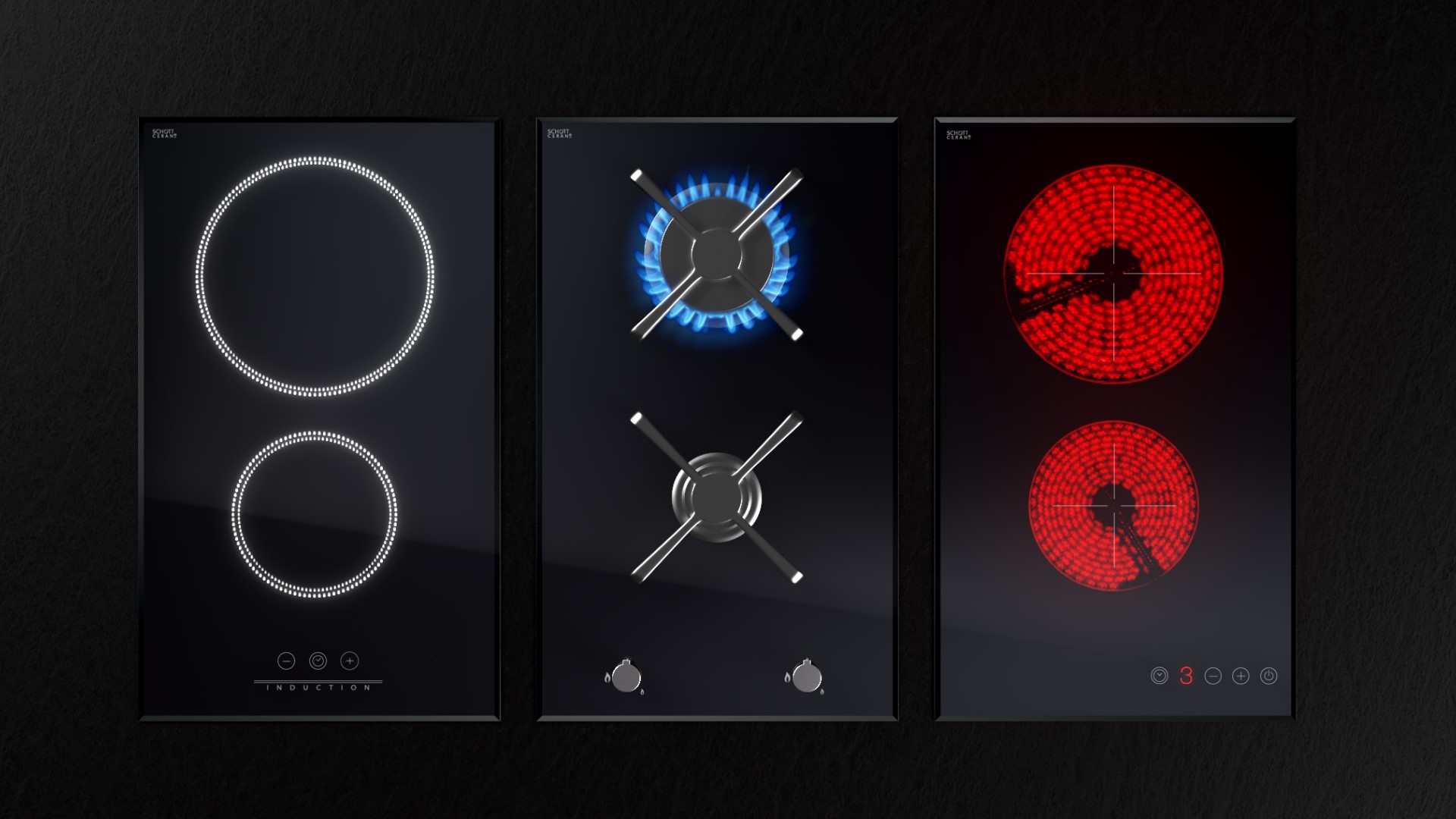
Ceran cooktop (left to right): Induction, gas, and radiant heating

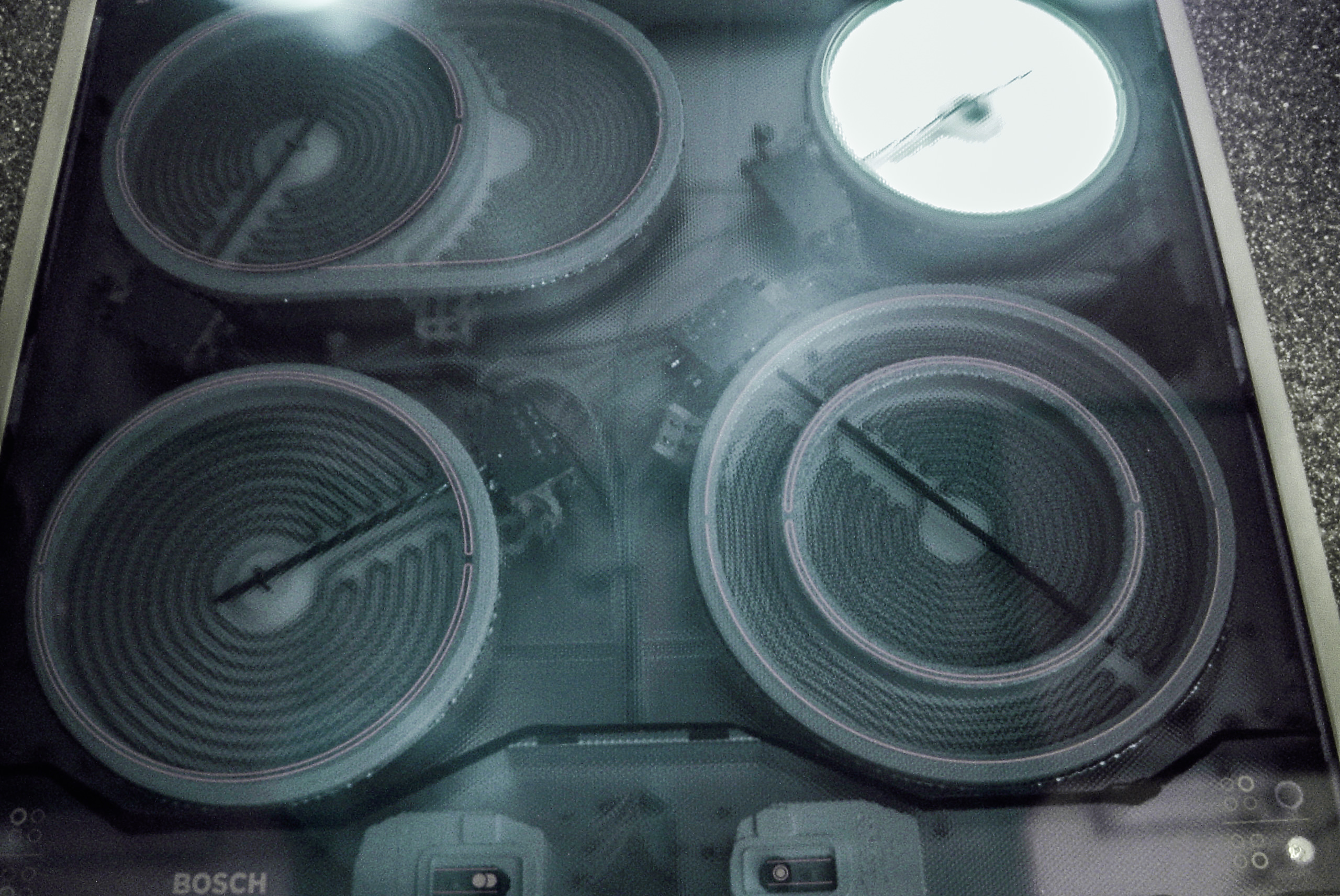
Infrared, Ceran glass-ceramic radiant heat cooktop

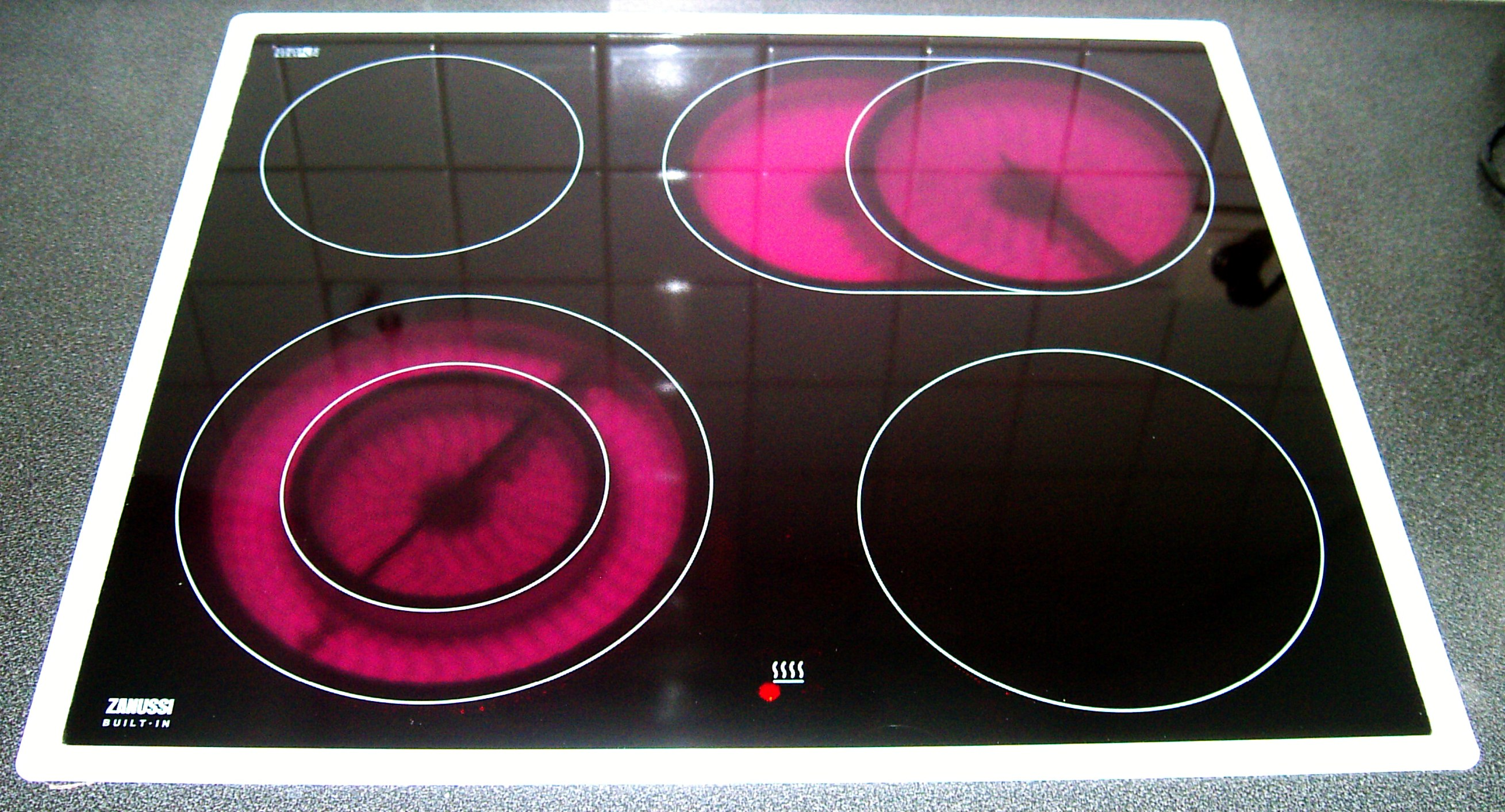
Visible light, Ceran glass-ceramic radiant heat cooktop

Glass-ceramic from the LAS system is a mechanically strong material and can sustain repeated and quick temperature changes, and its smooth glass-like surface is easy to clean, therefore it is often used as a cooktop surface. The material has a very low heat conduction coefficient, which means that it stays cool outside the cooking area. It can be made nearly transparent (15–20% loss in a typical cooktop) for radiation in the infrared wavelengths. In the visible range glass-ceramics can be transparent, translucent or opaque and even colored by coloring agents.

However, glass-ceramic is not totally unbreakable. Because it is still a brittle material as glass and ceramics are, it can be broken – in particular it is less robust than traditional cooktops made of steel or cast iron. There have been instances where users reported damage to their cooktops when the surface was struck with a hard or blunt object (such as a can falling from above or other heavy items).

Today, there are two major types of electrical stoves with cooktops made of glass-ceramic:

- A radiant heating stove uses coils or infrared halogen lamps as the heating elements. The surface of the glass-ceramic cooktop above the burner heats up, but the adjacent surface remains cool because of the low heat conduction coefficient of the material.
- An induction stove heats a metal pot's bottom directly through electromagnetic induction.

This technology is not entirely new, as glass-ceramic ranges were first introduced in the 1970s using Corningware tops instead of the more durable material used today. These first generation smoothtops were problematic and could only be used with flat-bottomed cookware as the heating was primarily conductive rather than radiative.

Compared to conventional kitchen stoves, glass-ceramic cooktops are relatively simple to clean, due to their flat surface. However, glass-ceramic cooktops can be scratched very easily, so care must be taken not to slide the cooking pans over the surface. If food with a high sugar content (such as jam) spills, it should never be allowed to dry on the surface, otherwise damage will occur.

For best results and maximum heat transfer, all cookware should be flat-bottomed and matched to the same size as the burner zone.

== Industry and material variations ==
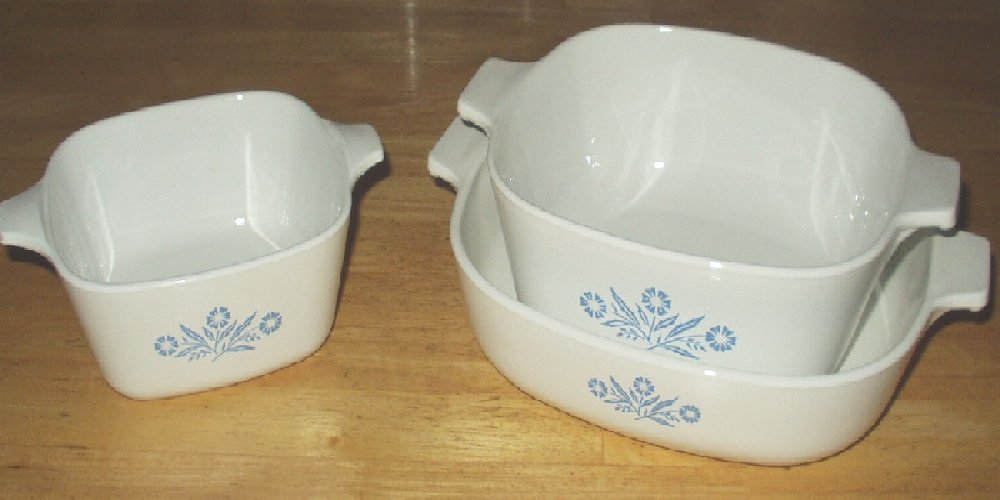
CorningWare casserole dish and other cookware pieces, with the 'Cornflower' pattern decoration

Some well-known brands of glass-ceramics are Pyroceram, Ceran, Eurokera, Zerodur, and Macor. Nippon Electric Glass is a predominant worldwide manufacturer of glass ceramics, whose related products in this area include FireLite and NeoCeram , ceramic glass materials for architectural and high temperature applications respectively. Keralite, manufactured by Vetrotech Saint-Gobain, is a specialty glass-ceramic fire and impact safety rated material for use in fire-rated applications. Glass-ceramics manufactured in the Soviet Union/Russia are known under the name Sitall. Macor is a white, odorless, porcelain-like glass ceramic material and was developed originally to minimize heat transfer during crewed spaceflight by Corning Inc. StellaShine, launched in 2016 by Nippon Electric Glass Co., is a heat-resistant, glass-ceramic material with a thermal shock resistance of up to 800 degrees Celsius. This was developed as an addition to Nippon's line of heat-resistant cooking range plates along with materials like Neoceram. KangerTech is an ecigarette manufacturer which began in Shenzhen, China which produces glass ceramic materials and other special hardened-glass applications like vaporizer modification tanks.

The same class of material is also used in Visions and CorningWare glass-ceramic cookware, allowing it to be taken from the freezer directly to the stovetop or oven with no risk of thermal shock while maintaining the transparent look of glassware.

== See also ==
- Chemically strengthened glass
- Ion exchange

== Literature ==
- McMillan, P. W. (1974). "The glass phase in glass-ceramics". Glass Technology. 15 (1): 5–15.
- Bach, Hans; Krause, Dieter, eds. (2005). Low Thermal Expansion Glass Ceramics. Schott Series on Glass and Glass Ceramics. Bibcode:2005lteg.book.....B. doi:10.1007/3-540-28245-9. ISBN 3-540-24111-6.
- Höland, Wolfram; Beall, George H. (2012). Glass-Ceramic Technology. doi:10.1002/9781118265987. ISBN 978-0-470-48787-7.
- Pinckney, L.R. (2001). "Glass Ceramics". Encyclopedia of Materials: Science and Technology. pp. 3535–3540. doi:10.1016/B0-08-043152-6/00629-X. ISBN 978-0-08-043152-9.

Donald, I.W. (2016). The Science and Technology of Glasses and Glass-Ceramics, Society of Glass Technology, pp 434.
