= Pyroceram =

Glass-ceramic material

Pyroceram is the original glass-ceramic material developed and trademarked by Corning Glass in the 1950s. Pyroceram is an opaque, white, glass material, commonly used in kitchenware, glass stove tops, wood stove doors, etc.. It has high heat tolerance and low thermal expansion.

== Development ==
Its development has been traced to Corning's work in developing photosensitive glass. Corning credits S. Donald Stookey with the discovery of Pyroceram. While conducting research in 1953 on a photosensitive lithium silicate glass called Fotoform containing a dispersion of silver nanoparticles, Stookey noted that an accidentally overheated fragment of the glass resisted breakage when dropped. This discovery evolved into Pyroceram, with β-spodumene as the crystalline phase, and was used in 1958 for the production of CorningWare cookware. Pyroceram's thermal stability also results in its being used for mirrors in astronomical telescopes.

A transparent version of Pyroceram, with β-quartz as the crystalline phase, was also described in 1950s patents. By 1963 this variant was also being seriously studied for use in making cookware. It would be extensively explored over the next two decades and result in the creation of Visions cookware, by Corning France, in the late 1970s.

The manufacture of the material involves controlled crystallization. NASA classifies it as a glass-ceramic product.

After about 30 years of informal use as a standard in high-heat (≥1000 °C) applications, Pyroceram 9606 was approved by NIST as a certified reference material for thermal conductivity measurements.

For kitchenware, this ceramic-glass family has been composed approximately, as calculated from precursor glass batches in percent by weight on an oxide basis, of (or similar variations):

- 68.2% Silica Sand (SiO_{2})
- 19.2% Aluminium oxide (Al_{2}O_{3})
- 2.8% Lithium oxide (Li_{2}O)
- 1.8% Magnesium oxide (MgO)
- 1.0% Zinc oxide (ZnO)
- 0.75% Barium oxide (BaO)
- 2.7% Titanium dioxide (TiO_{2})
- 1.75% Zirconium dioxide (ZrO_{2})

Plus additional oxides and colorants depending on the product line being produced.

== Trademark ==
Pyroceram was originally a proprietary brand name. Corning registered Pyroceram as a trademark for glass-ceramic vessels and utensils in 1958, and in 1966 added polished glass-ceramic tabletops and countertops to the registered uses of the brand name. Both of those registrations have since ended.

In 1998, Corning registered Pyroceram as a trademark for clear glass-ceramic window glass for wood-burning stoves. It was also studied as a material for rocket nose cones.

== See also ==
- National Institute of Standards and Technology
