= Correll =

Correll may refer to:

- Correll, Minnesota, city in Big Stone County, Minnesota, United States

Correll is the surname of the following people:

- Charles Correll (1890–1972), American radio comedian
- Charles Correll (director) (1944–2004), American television director and cinematographer
- Denny Correll (1946–2002), American rock singer
- Donovan Stewart Correll (1908–1983), American botanist
- Ernst Hugo Correll (1882–1942), German film producer
- Gemma Correll (born 1984), British cartoonist
- Joshua Correll, American psychologist
- Nikolaus Correll (born 1977), German roboticist
- Percy Correll (1892–1974), Australian Antarctic explorer
- Rich Correll (born 1948), American television actor, director, producer and writer
- Richard V. Correll (1904–1990), American painter and printmaker
- Vic Correll (born 1946), American baseball player

== See also ==
- Correll v. Herring, a 2016 court case
- Corel, Canadian software company
- Corell (disambiguation)
- Corelle glassware and dishware
  - Corelle Brands
- Carrell (disambiguation)
