= Corell =

Corell is a surname. Notable people with the surname include:

- Antonio Corell (born 1950), Spanish former swimmer
- Hans Corell (born 1939), Swedish lawyer and diplomat
- Robert Corell (born 1934), American global climate scientist
- Roberto Corell, a Mexican film actor

== See also ==
- Corel, Canadian software company
- Corelle glassware and dishware
  - Corelle Brands
- Correll (disambiguation)
