= Evelyn Roberts (physicist) =

American physicist

Evelyn Hortense Roberts
- Born: 1893
- Died: 1991 (aged 97–98)
- Education: University of Michigan
- Scientific career
- Fields: Physics
- Workplaces: Corning Inc.

Evelyn Hortense Roberts (1893–1991) was a scientist whose contributions spanned fundamental studies on glass to many applied industries. Roberts was the third woman to receive an advanced degree in physics from the University of Michigan. Roberts is recognized as one of the "Glass Heroes" of Corning Glass for the research she conducted with the company as a post-graduate student, prior to receiving her master's degree in physics.

== Life and education ==
Roberts received a B.A. in mathematics and minor in history from the University of Michigan (1915). During college, Roberts also taught high school classes and began a research position at Corning Glass Works.

After Corning, Roberts returned to the University of Michigan to further her studies in physics and received her M.S. in 1921. Not only was it rare to be a woman studying physics at the time, but Roberts was also accomplished in her studies. She was the recipient of a University Scholarship ($300) for the 1920-1921 academic year, and the only student with a physics affiliation to receive that fellowship that year. She would go on to receive her master's degree in physics in 1921 and was a member of the Sigma Xi Honor Society.

== Research, career, and publications ==
Roberts held a position as a research physicist at Corning (1917-1920). Upon her appointment in 1917, Roberts would become one of the first female research scientists at Corning Glass. During her time with the company, Roberts ran experiments on conductivity, expansion, viscosity, and thermal shock of glass. She specifically worked on research questions relevant to the development of Pyrex and was a collaborator of John T. Littleton. Her first author publication with Littleton is linked below:

- Roberts, E. H.; Littleton, J. T. (1920-07-01). "A Method for Determining the Annealing Temperature of Glass". JOSA. 4 (4): 224–229. Bibcode:1920JOSA....4..224L. doi:10.1364/JOSA.4.000224.

Roberts would go on to hold a varied career after Corning including research positions in several other major industries including: the Engineering-Technical Laboratories of Sears, Roebuck & Co and also as a research specialist in Home Economics at the Washington Agricultural Experiment Station. With the Washington Agricultural Experiment Station (based at Washington State College), Roberts wrote articles and reports on a series of topics including:

- "The Bactericidal Effectiveness of Home Laundering Methods for Silk and Rayon"
- "The present use of work time of farm homemakers"
- "Vacuum Cleaning"
- "Suitability of vacuum cleaner types for various rugs and carpets"

While this work is distant from her post-graduate research at Corning glass, it is not surprising that this was an accessible research field for female scientists at the time. In addition, Roberts prior research experience was on Pyrex, a commercial brand heavily marketed for the home and for homemakers during the 1920s which was when Roberts was a recent graduate of the University of Michigan seeking employment. During Robert's time at the Washington Agricultural Experiment Station, her research department was distinguished by being composed solely of women who all held at least one advanced degree and several women in the division also held joint faculty appointments.
