= Revere Ware =

Kitchenware line

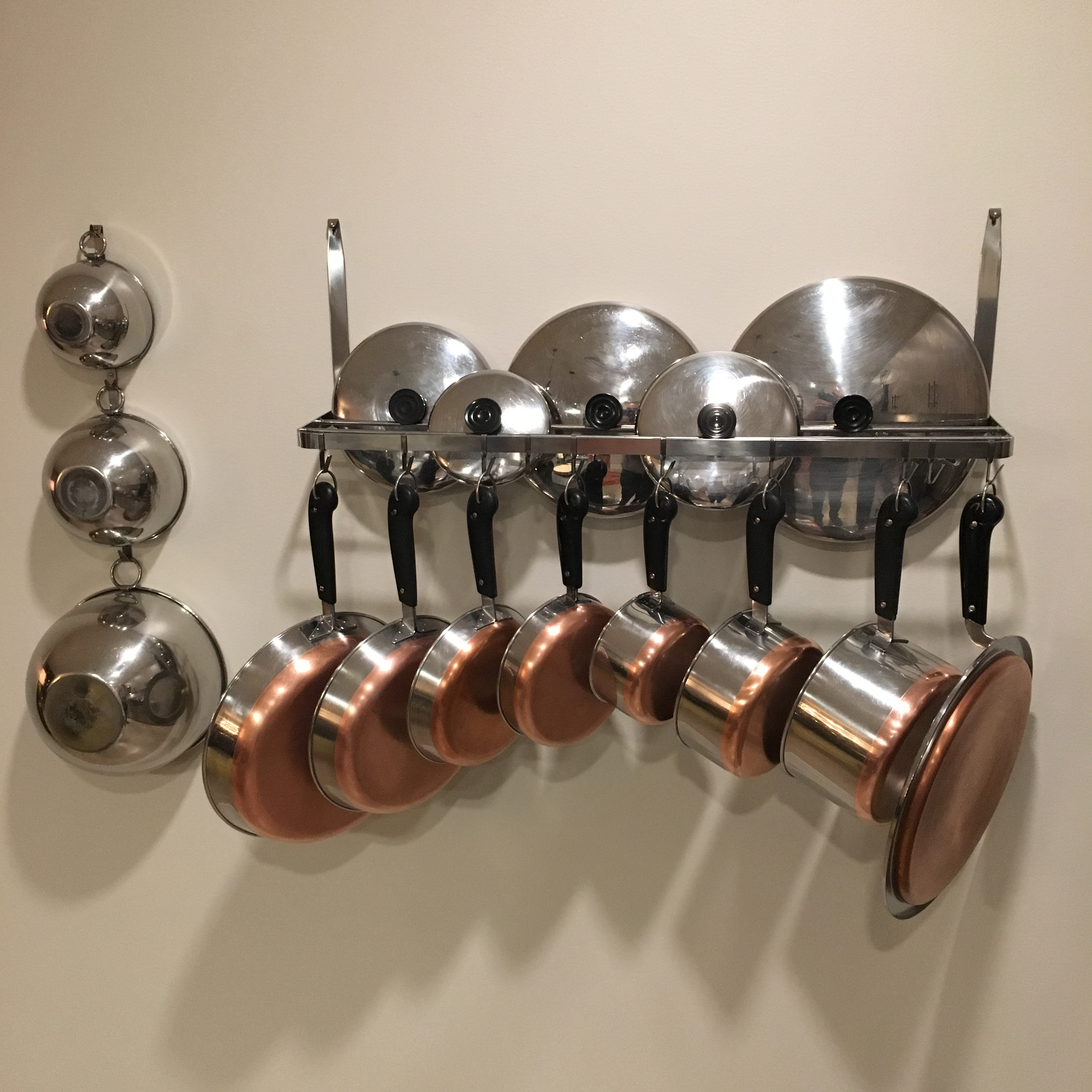
Vintage Revere Ware, manufactured before 1968 and carrying the prized "Process Patent" maker's mark on the thick copper bottom, is finding its way back into modern kitchens. (Photo courtesy of Blane van Pletzen-Rands)

Revere Ware was a line of consumer and commercial kitchen wares introduced in 1939 by the Revere Copper and Brass Corp. The line focuses primarily on consumer cookware such as (but not limited to) skillets, sauce pans, stock pots, and tea kettles. Initially Revere Ware was the culmination of various innovative techniques developed during the 1930s, the most popular being construction of stainless steel with rivetlessly attached bakelite handles, copper-clad bases and rounded interiors for ease of cleaning. Over the next 40+ years, Revere Ware would introduce new series to position itself in competition with other manufacturers at various price points, or for specific specialty markets. In the early 1960s the profitability of Revere Ware began to level off. Coinciding with new series introductions, cost-cutting measures were implemented in the manufacture of the traditional cookware. The bakelite handles were changed from two piece to one, and the thickness of utensil walls and copper cladding were reduced.

While the cookware division remained profitable, the seventies saw parent company Revere Brass & Copper Corp. experience a shift of fortune. Transferring of its aluminum production from domestic to overseas manufacturing marked the beginning of the end. By 1982 financial issues due to these failing aluminum operations forced Revere Brass & Copper to file for bankruptcy. By 1985 the cookware subsidiary Revere Ware Incorporated, which had remained profitable, had been sold to Corning Glass Inc. Within ten years Corning Glass Inc. had expanded Revere Ware from the four lines at their acquisition, to over a dozen lines, while ceasing any domestic manufacturing. In 1998 World Kitchen became the controlling parent company of Corning. During this period Revere Ware suffered from branding incoherency, with nearly a dozen new "lines" introduced by 2006 before briefly leaving the market. Revere Ware was subsequently reintroduced by World Kitchen currently, and as of 2016 offered select variations: Copper-cored stainless steel, traditional copper-clad bottomed cookware and anodized non-stick aluminum.

By 2018, World Kitchen has ceased operations and the Revere Ware line was no longer in production. In 2023, Full Sail IP Partners announced it had acquired the Revere Ware Brand from Instant Brands. Full Sail IP Partners is a company that invests in brands and licenses them to other companies. Full Sail IP Partners intended to revive the Revere Ware brand, expanding it to products such as dinnerware and kitchen gadgets.

== Lines and series produced by Revere Ware ==
=== Pre-Corning-developed cookware (1939–1986) ===
Revere Ware has introduced several lines since its inception. The main series has always been the 1400 line, featuring the classic curved, smooth knurled bakelite handles, stainless steel walls and copper bottoms. The Patriot Ware series functioned as Revere Wares economy line, briefly being marketed directly by mail order through J.C. Penney, with an exclusive Made Expressly for Penney's by Revere trademark. Copper Maid was another economy series introduced in 1957. In 1959, in response to leveling sales, the Designers' Group series was introduced, intended to reestablish Revere Ware as the premiere consumer cookware. The series would be sold until 1973, having some cross over with the Designer's Group products introduced in 1969. While historians and aficionados cite the 6000 Line Designers' Group pieces as the finest cookware manufactured by Revere Ware, the 6500 Line Designer's Group was a confusing addition that sold poorly.

Other lines introduced to expand the Revere Ware brand were the heavy duty Institutional line, substituting stainless steel handles for the bakelites. A selection of this series was reintroduced as Patio Ware in 1956, attempting to exploit the barbecue craze of the 1950s. The larger, more rugged handles of the 1800 line were marketed as made for men's larger hands. Various aluminum products were introduced, such as the Galaxy line. The Galaxy line featured stainless steel construction with a bonded aluminum lining. The 500 line was a series of miniature 1400 series cookware, marketed as toys for children, but manufactured to the same standards as all their consumer cookware. The mini sets, which were available through 1983, have become collectible.

Prior to the sale of Revere Ware to Corning Glass Inc in 1985, the brand offered or had in development four series. The traditional 1400 series continued to sell well. The newly developed 2000 line, for use on the then-new 1980s technology of ceramic- and glass-top stoves, featured heavy aluminum bottoms for good heat transfer. Both the ONXY line and the Micro-Fryer line were released after the sale, but were discontinued almost immediately as they were perceived as being in direct competition with existing products from subsidiaries of Corning.

- 1400 Line – Copper Clad introduced 1939
- 5000 Line – Institutional introduced 1954
- 0500 Line – Miniature introduced 1955
- 1800 Line – Patio Ware introduced 1956
- 4000 Line – Patriot Ware introduced 1957
- 0100 Line – Copper Maid introduced 1957
- 6000 Line – Designers' Group introduced 1959
- 9000 Line – Deluxe Revere Ware introduced 1962
- 8300 Line – Revere Teflon introduced 1963
- 8500 Line – Galaxy introduced 1964
- 8700 Line – Galaxy Perma-Loc introduced 1965
- 7800 Line – Galaxy Autumn Leaves introduced 1967
- Paul Revere Ware Line – Paul Revere Signature Collection introduced 1967
- 8200 Line – Daisy Decorated introduced 1969
- 6500 Line – Designer's Group introduced 1969
- 7100 Line – Contempora introduced 1971
- 7000 Line – Stainless Revere Ware introduced 1974
- 2000 Line – Aluminum Disc Bottom Cookware introduced 1986
- The ONXY Line introduced 1987
- The Micro-Fryer line introduced 1987

=== Post-Corning Glass Inc. acquisition cookware ===
The first series developed and introduced after the Corning Glass inc acquisition was the Proline, a heavy gauge stainless steel product that went through many arbitrary, minor changes during its run. Minor changes would happen frequently across all their lines, undermining consumer confidence. The Vista series was a reintroduction of the 1400 series, again with minor changes and now sold with glass lids taken from other Corning product lines. The Spectrum series were aluminum non-stick pans with colored enamel bodies imported from Thailand. Only four years after the Vista Line was introduced, the Centura series was yet another reintroduction of the traditional 1400 line. The Centura series sold with less expensive materials, being made overseas, and were offered exclusively by Wal-Mart. Most other series introduced were contemporaries of other lines from Corning subsidiaries.

In 1998 Revere Ware, along with all of the divisions of Corning Consumer Products, were reorganized under the World Kitchen inc banner. While a handful of unique lines emerged after this restructure, it was three lines in particular that were significant as reintroductions, despite being produced overseas, and using less expensive materials. These series were the Tri-Ply Stainless series, based on the 7000 Stainless Revere Line introduced in 1974, the Copper Select series based on the Paul Revere Ware line of 1967, and finally the Copper Clad series of 2003, which was yet another reintroduction of the 1400 line.

- Proline introduced 1989
- Vista introduced 1989
- Spectrum introduced 1992
- Excel introduced 1993
- Centura introduced 1997
- Independence introduced 1998
- Revolution introduced 1998
- Chef's Preference introduced 2002
- Culinary Classic introduced 2002
- Chef's Request introduced 2003
- Polished Non-Stick introduced 2003
- Tri-Ply Stainless introduced 2003
- Copper Clad introduced 2003
- Traditions introduced 2003
- Convenience introduced 2003
- Copper Select introduced 2004
- Polished Ellipse introduced 2004

== 1400 line ==
The 1400 line is manufactured with all of Revere Ware's defining features: copper-clad bases, rounded corners for ease of cleaning, bakelite handles, and Vapor Seal lids. Early pans and skillets featured two piece handles, held together by rivets and screws. The earliest style of bakelite handles feature two screws, just a little more than an inch apart, near the pan side of the handle. Later, a screw was located at either end of the handle. By 1968, in a cost-cutting measure, the bakelite was made from one piece and pressed onto the attached metal handle.

When identifying various utensils, know that skillets are always of a larger diameter, with a shallow depth and a single long handle. Sauce pans will have a relative depth, and also a single long handle. Stock pots are generally four quarts or larger, and have two smaller handles for grasping at each side. Dutch ovens are similarly constructed, but feature a flared edge at the top of the pot with a narrow seat for their larger, more pronouncedly domed lid to seal. The domed lids used for Dutch Ovens (and square Skillets) are distinctly different in shape than that of the traditional bell-lipped stainless steel lids. The walls of these Domed lids are noticeably taller than standard utensil lids.

Revere Ware double boilers and steamers come in three variations. The first (marked (1) below) is an insert, which nestles into the pan, supported by a lip and two small "ears", or flares at the mouth of the insert. This variety remains almost entirely within the heating utensil while in use. The second (marked (2) below)is a ribbed design with a single handle, similar to a Sauce Pan in construction. Only a small portion of the Steamer/Double Boiler rests within the Heating utensil, to create a seal, while the remainder protrudes. The last variety (marked (3) below) is also ribbed, but features two small handles (much like stock pots) on either side, to facilitate ease of use.

Being the longest-running and cornerstone line of wares produced by Revere Ware, the 1400 series is an iconic part of American kitchens. At the height of 1400's popularity, nearly 5 and a half million pieces were shipping a year. It was the "Gold Standard" of American cookware, at its peak offering 39 items simultaneously (counting lids as separate pieces) across 12 distinct utensil types. While specialty items and minor revisions were occasionally made to the line, the 1400 series existed with a relative consistency before the sale to Corning Glass Inc. in 1985. The most iconic pieces are listed below.

Utensil	Diameter	Depth	Lid
Sauce Pans
3/4 qt. Sauce Pan	5"	2.5"	5"
1 qt. Sauce Pan	5.5"	3"	5.5"
1.5 qt. Sauce	6"	3.5"	6"
2 qt. Sauce Pan	7"	3.5"	7"
2.5 qt. Sauce Pan			?
3 qt. Sauce Pan	7"	4.5"	7"
4 qt. Sauce Pan	8"	4.5"	8"
5 qt. Sauce Pan	8"	6"	8"
Stock Pots
4 qt. Stock Pot	8"	4.5"	8"
4.5 qt. Stock Pot	9"	4.25"	9"
6 qt. Stock Pot	9"	5.75"	9"
8 qt. Stock Pot	9"	7.5"	9"
10 qt. Stock Pot	10"	7.5"	10"
16 qt. Stock Pot	12"	8.5"	12"
Skillets
6" Skillet	6"	2"	6"
7" Skillet	7"	2"	7"
8" Skillet	8"	2"	8"
9" Skillet	9"	2"	9"
10" Skillet	10"	2"	10"
12" Skillet	12"	2.5"	12"
Steamers & Double Boilers
6" Double Boiler (1)	6""	2.25"	6"
7" Double Boiler (1)	7"	2.75"	7"
7" Steamer (1)	7"	2.75"	7"
7" Steamer (2)	7"	3.25"	7"
8" Double Boiler (3)	8"	4"	8"
8" Steamer (3)	8"	4"	8"
Dutch Ovens
5 qt. Dutch Oven	9"	4.5"	9" Domed
6 qt. Dutch Oven	10"	4.5"	10" Domed
Coffee & Tea
Drip Coffee Maker	8 Cup		Unique Lid
Percolator	8 Cup		Unique Lid
Tea Kettle	6 Cup		Unique Lid
Tea Kettle	2 1/3 qt.		Unique Lid
Specialty Items
1 Cup Sauce Pan	3.5"	2"	No Lid
1 qt. Combination Pan	7"	1.75"	7"
1.5 qt. Pour Spout Pan			
4 Cup Poaching insert	8"	1.5"	8"
8" Omelette Skillet	8"	1.5"	No Lid
6 Cup Poaching insert	10"	1.5"	10"
10" Omelette Skillet	10"	1.5"	No Lid
10.5" Square Skillet	10.5" Diagonally		10" Squared
12.5" Square Skillet	12.5" Diagonally		12" Squared
12" Griddle	12"	Flat	None

Notes on Specialty items: The 1 qt. Combination Pan can be identified by its straight walled construction, opposed to a Skillet's flared walls, and will be stamped "1 qt." on post-1968 pieces.

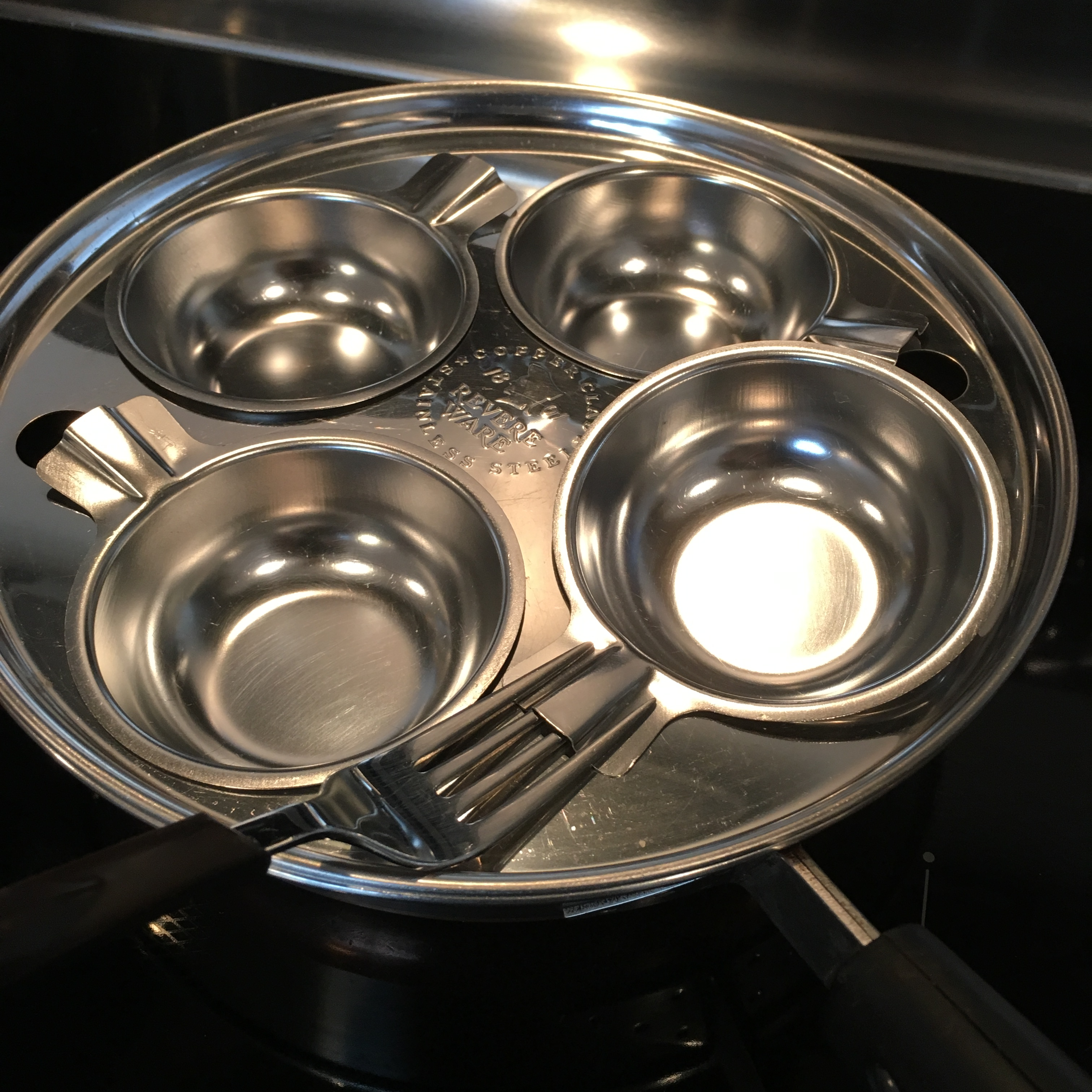
Revere Ware 8" 1488 Breakfast Unit Egg Poacher with four removable stainless steel cups. Note the "lock on" cup handles, designed to accept any household fork. (Photo courtesy of Blane van Pletzen-Rands)

Egg Poaching inserts and removable cups (1515 and 1520), either four or six, are placed into correspondingly sized Skillets. The poaching cup handles are designed with an exclusive "lock on" handle, and accept most any household fork for lifting.

Omelette skillets have a specially designed domed shape, with nearly transparent transitions from pan-base to walls. This surface facilitates the ease of omelette preparing. As the primary purpose of the pan is omelettes, it is not intended for use with a lid.

== Proper measuring of Revere Ware utensils and lids ==
How to properly measure Revere Ware diameters: Pot and pan diameters are measured from the interior of the walls. Measurements taken from the exterior of the walls often include the extra material of the rolled lip, giving the illusion of an additional quarter inch of width. As an example, re-sellers and collectors of vintage Revere Ware may measure a utensil as being 9.25" or 9 1/4", when in fact the pot should properly be measured 9". Skillets may also be improperly measured, as the cooking surface is slightly smaller than the marked or measured size. The marked skillet dimensions refer to interior circumference at the top most part of the flared walls, as the pans are designed to use a lid that coincides with this diameter. Lid Diameters can also lend to confusion, as the correct stainless steel lids of vintage (pre-Corning) Revere Ware have belled lips. These belled lips facilitate the oft-advertised Vapor Seal, a method of locking in moisture, which some believe retain nutrients. Re-sellers and collectors, when measuring the inner circumference of the bell flange, often measure the lids an eighth to a quarter of an inch narrower than proper size, or conversely, measure the outside of the bell flare, adding an additional 1/4" to 3/8" of an inch of diameter. A good rule of thumb is knowing all lids and utensils are designed to be measured at whole-inch increments, with the exception of 5.5" sauce pans and lids.

== Identifying early-era pieces ==
Revere Ware is considered a collectible brand of cookware, much like certain cast iron cookware brands. Like all collectibles, some pieces have become more desirable than others. There have been many different lines and changes since 1939, yet most utensils retain a universal look. It can be tricky to identify specific years of pieces, especially within the 1400 line. There are two common methods to identify the most desirable periods.

=== Pre-1968 trademarking ===
Featuring far thicker copper cladding and steel walls, items produced prior to 1968 are the pieces most collectors seek. Most are identifiable by a "double ring" trademark. The earliest Revere Ware products, produced in 1939, may have a trademark that includes the name Riding Revere, as initially Revere Ware had not decided on the branding of their new product. Despite securing a patent for their copper cladding process in 1942, pieces from 1939–1946 featured a Pat. Pend. stamp underneath the logo. From 1946–1968 pieces feature the most prominent trademark logo, the large double ring containing the Revere head outline, Copper Clad – Stainless Steel and Revere Ware. Below are the words Made under Process Patent. Production initially all took place in Rome, NY, but starting in 1949 expanded to California and then Illinois. Items made at these plants included additions to the Trademark; Riverside, CA or Clinton, IL. Pieces made in Rome, NY are identified by not including a place of manufacture, prior to 1974.

=== Post-1968 trademarking ===
Starting in 1968, the trademarking on the bottom of Revere Ware utensils became simplified. Gone was the distinct "double ring" marking, and any mention of patent processes. This coincided with reduction in thickness of the copper cladding and the stainless steel walls. While reducing the material used for manufacture cut costs, it has been recognized as noticeably lowering quality and durability. Still, Revere Ware remained in demand, and pieces from the 1968–86 era continue to be popular entry items for collectors. The new, simplified trademark featured the familiar Revere silhouette, flanked by 1801, the year of the company's origin. Below this, in stark lettering, was printed REVERE WARE, with an identifying marker for the size of the utensil (a new feature) and the location of manufacture.
