= Parides klagesi =

Conservation status
- Least Concern (IUCN 3.1)

Scientific classification
- Kingdom: Animalia
- Phylum: Arthropoda
- Clade: Pancrustacea
- Class: Insecta
- Order: Lepidoptera
- Family: Papilionidae
- Genus: Parides
- Species: P. klagesi

Binomial name
- Parides klagesi (Ehrman, 1904)

Species of butterfly

Parides klagesi is a species of butterfly in the family Papilionidae. It was thought to be endemic to Venezuela before being discovered in Brazil. A recent, freely available article by Olaf Mielke and Mirna Casagrande (2007) summarizes the known geographical distribution of the species. Because of the prior CITES listing and apparent rarity, this species was placed in the endangered species list for the northern Brazilian state of Pará.

== Description ==
A peculiar little species in which the hinder angle of the cell on the forewing is quite rounded; neither the forewing nor the hindwing has distinct fringe-spots. Forewing with a white band before the hindmargin; hindwing with a band composed of red spots. Abdomen entirely black, even at the tip. The male, taken only in 1983, is described by Racheli and Pischedda (1987) A full description of the female is provided by Rothschild, W. and Jordan, K. (1906) BOA images

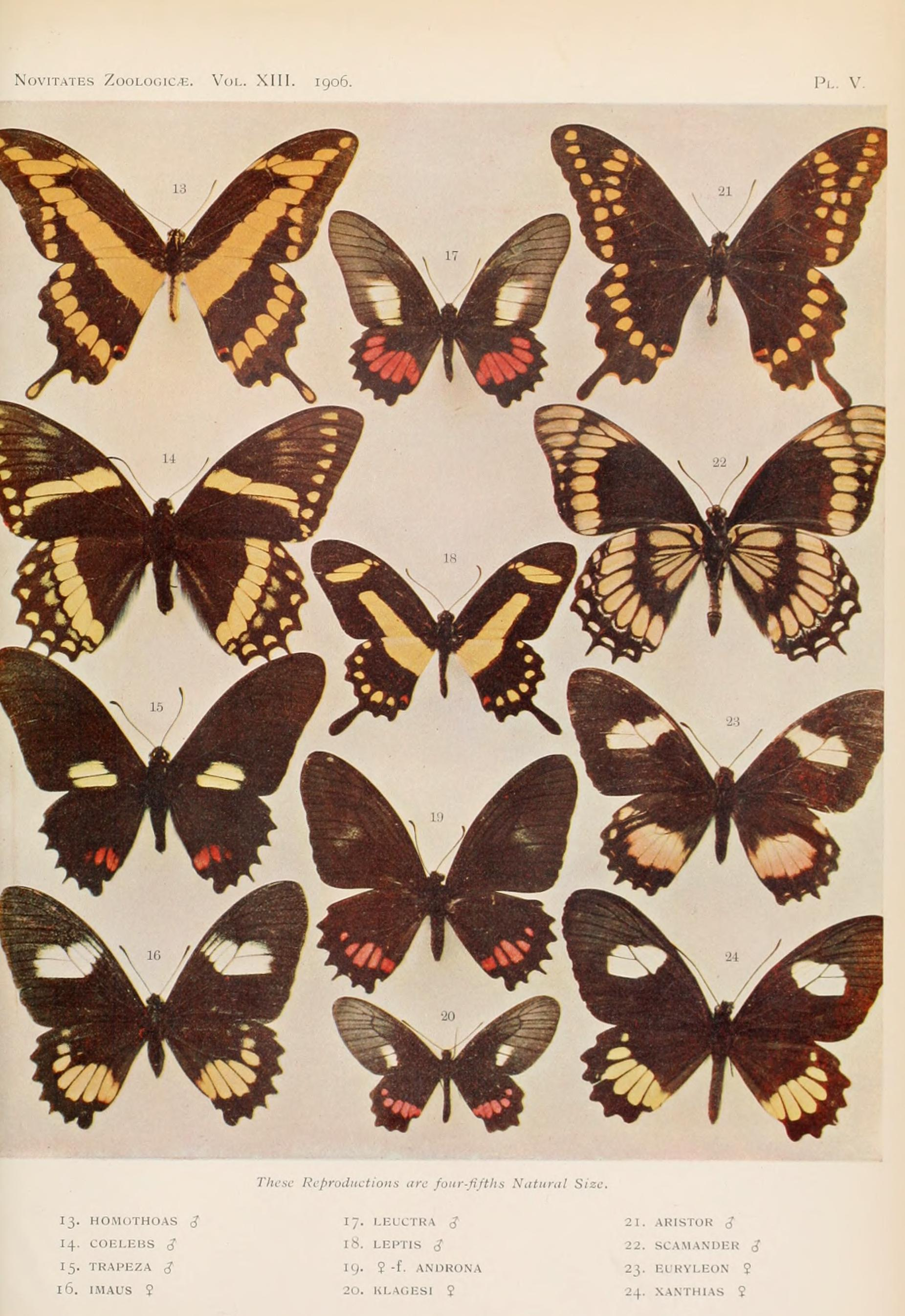
Novitates Zoologicae 1906 Pl.V

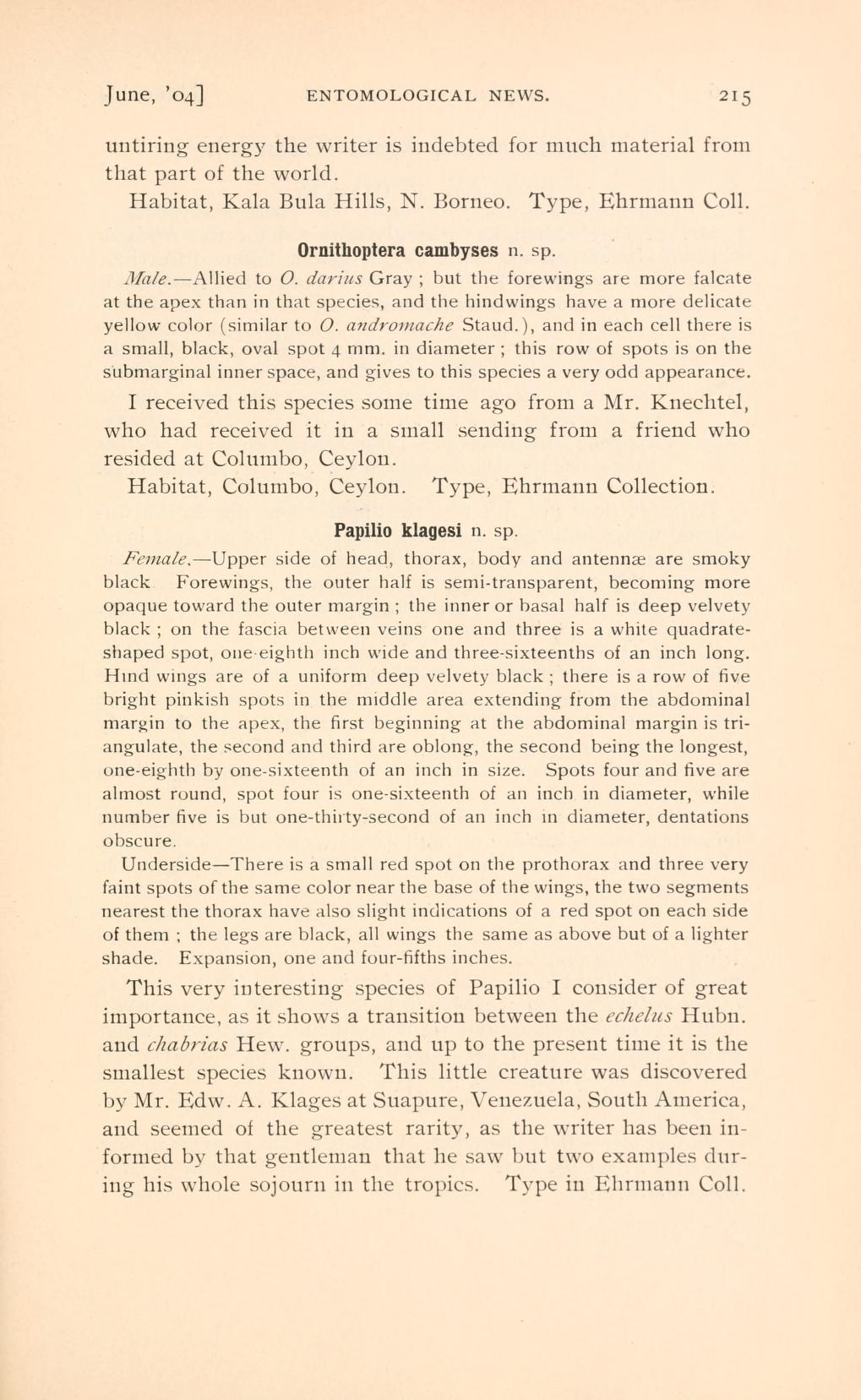
Entomological News 1904 Description of Parides klagesi

== Habitat ==
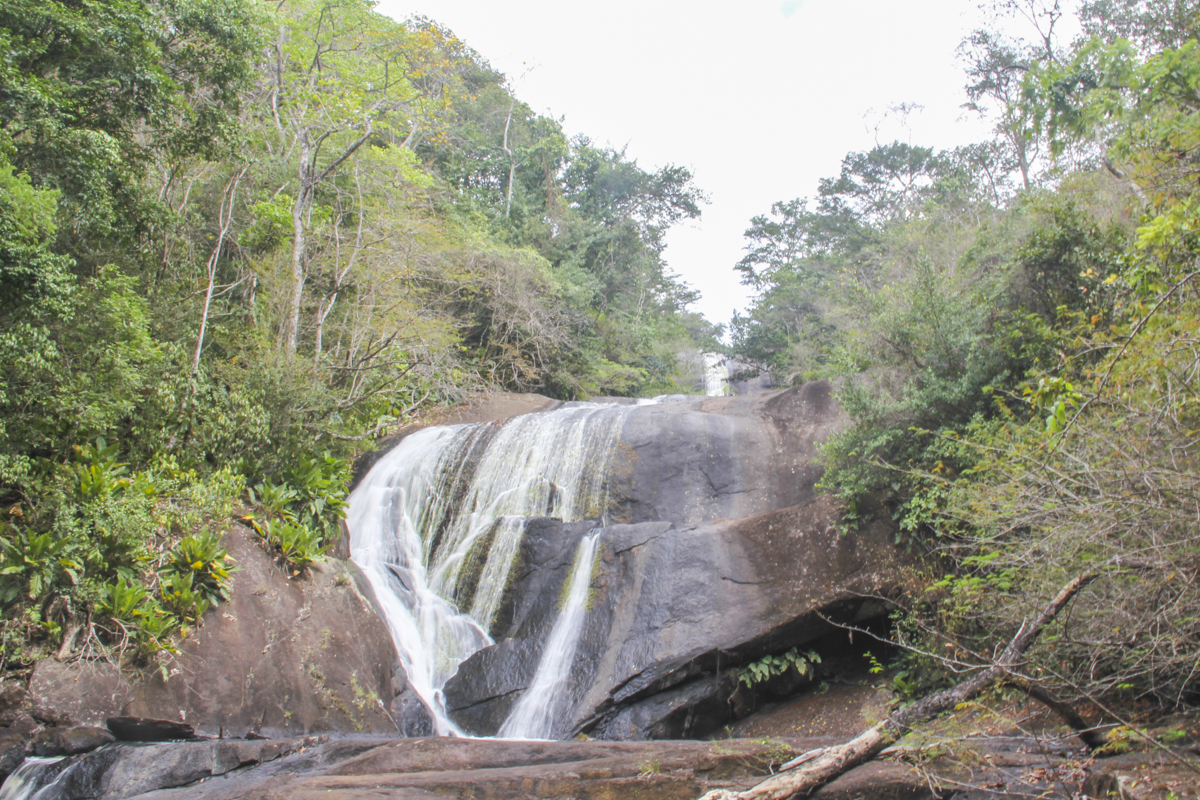
Deciduous monsoon forest habitat. Sierra de Imataca, Venezuela

Seasonal semideciduous monsoon forest. On clay soil.

== Status ==
A rare and little-known species known only from the semideciduous forests of Imataca and Imeri refugia and, likely the Belem refuge in Brazil (Santo Antônio do Tauá). One female in the British Museum (Nat. Hist.) London, is labeled "Mts. Aureos, Maranham, T. Belt".

== Etymology ==
Named for the professional American collector, Samuel M. Klages.
