= What a Crock Meals =

American frozen prepared meal company

- Type: Private
- Industry: Prepared meals
- Founded: 2013
- Headquarters: Delaware County, Pennsylvania, United States
- Products: Frozen prepared meals, slow-cooker meals, soups, dips, desserts, sides, gift packages
- Website: www.whatacrockmeals.com

What a Crock Meals is an American frozen prepared-meal and meal-delivery company based in Delaware County, Pennsylvania. The company sells portioned frozen meals, soups, sides, dips, desserts and gift packages, including meals designed for slow cookers, pressure cookers, ovens and other at-home heating methods.

== History ==
What a Crock Meals was founded in 2013. According to a 2023 interview with Food Box HQ, the company began after Justin West and his wife, Brieanna, prepared and froze dinners for their own family. West said that relatives and friends later began asking the couple to make additional meals for them, which led the family to buy ingredients in larger quantities and purchase extra freezers.

West told Food Box HQ that the business first rented a local kitchen and sold meals through social media before purchasing its first building in March 2014. He said the company opened that location in September 2014 and later expanded to additional retail locations in Delaware County, Pennsylvania, while also developing online sales and shipping.

In 2016, Philadelphia magazine reported that What a Crock Meals to Go had locations in Brookhaven and Garnet Valley and was opening a third location at the Market at the Fareway in Chestnut Hill. The article described the company as selling prepackaged slow-cooker meals, soups, sides and weekend meal packs.

In 2017, Philadelphia magazine included What a Crock in its Best of Philly archive for dinner planning. The listing described the company as selling ready-made frozen meals that required several hours in a slow cooker and could be purchased at stores in Delaware County and Chestnut Hill or delivered to customers.

In July 2025, WTXF-TV's Good Day Philadelphia aired a segment from Brookhaven, Pennsylvania, about the family behind What a Crock Meals.

== Business model ==
What a Crock Meals sells frozen meals individually, in multi-meal orders and through recurring subscriptions. Reviewed reported that customers could buy meals online on demand or through a subscription, and could also pick up meals at local Pennsylvania storefronts. MealFinds described the company as a prepared-meal service focused on slow-cooker meals and noted that customers could place one-time orders or subscribe to recurring deliveries.

Food Box HQ reported that the company ships meals with dry ice and insulation to keep products frozen in transit. In the same interview, West said the company shipped to the United States except Alaska and Hawaii and also operated local retail locations in Delaware County, Pennsylvania.

== Products and services ==
What a Crock Meals sells frozen prepared meals by portion. Its products have included entrees, soups, dips, desserts, sides, sauces, bundles and gift packages.

Reviewed described the meals as frozen prepared meals that can be heated in a slow cooker or Instant Pot, with some items requiring separate pasta preparation or oven heating. MealFinds described the company's menu as including slow-cooker meals, soups, dips, desserts, sides and sauces, with products organized by protein type, meal extras, dietary categories and cooking method.

== Reception ==
In a 2022 review for Reviewed, Sarah Kovac wrote that What a Crock's meals were useful for people with limited mobility because they reduced the amount of cooking and preparation required at home. The review also noted that the convenience came at a higher cost than cooking from scratch.

MealFinds' 2021 review listed the company's variety, gift use cases and lack of subscription requirement as advantages, while noting that some per-portion pricing and shipping costs could be high.

== Awards and recognition ==
- 2017: Philadelphia magazine Best of Philly archive listing for dinner planning.
