= George Alexander Ehrman =

American entomologist

George Alexander Ehrman (2 February 1862 - 30 January 1926) was an American entomologist who specialised in Lepidoptera notably Papilionidae.

Ehrman invented equipment which came into general use in the manufacture of blown and pressed glass for the Macbeth-Evans Glass Company and the United States Glass Company. In later years he was employed in the Research Laboratory of the Mesta Machine Company.

Financially secure Ehrman was able during his later life to devote himself to natural history including ornithology. He made extensive collections of the Lepidoptera and Coleoptera of western Pennsylvania then extended his collections worldwide. He specialised in Papilionidae, the genus Catocala, and the butterflies and moths of Liberia, and the beetle genus Cychrus and its allies.

His collection of American und exotic Rhopalocera and Coleoptera was bequeathed to the Carnegie Museum of Natural History. The species described by him are listed by Holland (1927)

== Works ==
partial list

- Ehrmann, G. A. (1895): Description of the female Papilio pelaus Fab. Entomological News 6(9), pp. [303-304]
- Ehrmann, G. A. (1902): A New Papilio from the Orient. Entomological News 13(9), pp. [291]
- Ehrmann, G. A. (1904): New forms of exotic Papilionidae Entomological News 15(6), pp. [214-215]
- Ehrmann, G. A. (1912): A new Papilio from Central AmericaCanadian Entomologist 44(8), pp. [244]
- Ehrmann, G. A. (1918): New exotic Papilios Lepidoptera (Boston) 2(11), pp. [82- 84]
- Ehrmann, G. A. (1919): New tropical American Papilios Lepidoptera (Boston) 3(2), pp. [10-11; (3)21-22]
- Ehrmann, G. A. (1919): A new tropical American Papilio Lepidoptera (Boston) 3(4), pp. [30-31]
- Ehrmann, G. A. (1919): New tropical American Papilios Lepidoptera (Boston) 3(5), pp. [36-38]
- Ehrmann, G. A. (1920): A new tropical American Papilio Lepidoptera (Boston) 4(2), pp. [13-14]
- Ehrmann, G. A. (1920): New exotic Papilionids. Bull. Brooklyn ent. Soc. 15, pp. [21-22]
- Ehrmann, G. A. (1920): Papilio pyrholochus, nov. spec. Lepidoptera (Boston) 4(3), pp. [20-21]
- Ehrmann, G. A. (1921): New exotic Papilios Lepidoptera (Boston) 5(1), pp. [02. Mrz]
- Ehrmann, G. A. (1921): Some new Papilios and Ornithoptera Lepidoptera (Boston) 5(2), pp. [17-19]
- Ehrmann, G. A. (1921): Some new Papilios and Ornithoptera. Lepidoptera 5(2), pp. [17-19]
