= Instant Pot =

Canadian brand of multicookers (2010–)

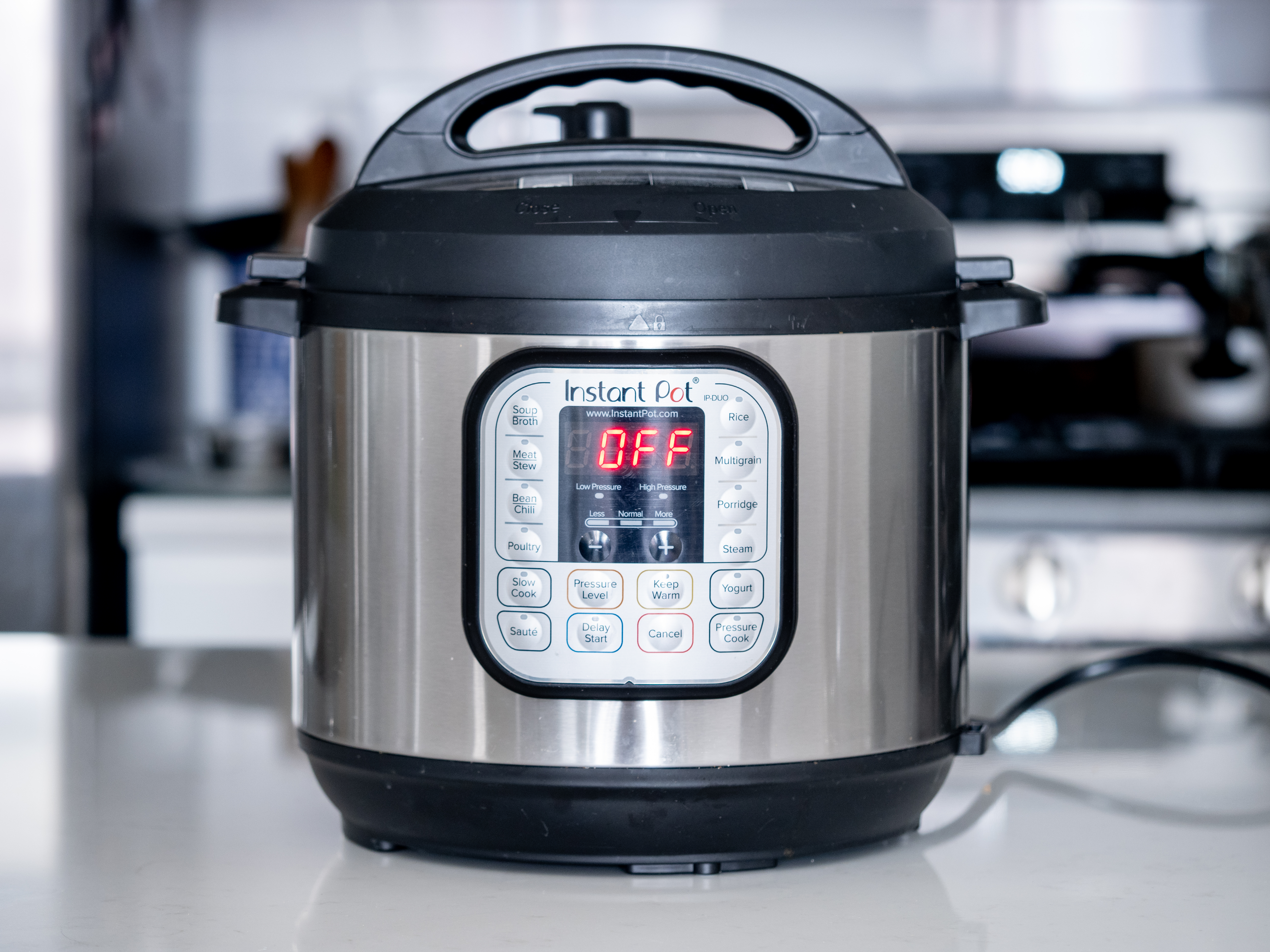
- An Instant Pot DUO60
- Type: Multicooker
- Inventor: Robert Wang
- Inception: 2010; 16 years ago
- Manufacturer: Instant Pot Brands
- Available: Yes
- Current supplier: Midea Group
- Website: instantpot.com

Instant Pot is a brand of automated multicookers manufactured by Instant Pot Brands. It is sometimes colloquially referred to as InstaPot. The multicookers are electronically-controlled combined pressure cookers and slow cookers. The original cookers were marketed as 6-in-1 appliances designed to consolidate the cooking and preparing of food to one device. The brand later expanded to include non-pressure slow cookers which can be left on for 8 hours or more, sous-vide immersion circulators, blenders, air fryers, and rice cookers.

Instant Pot is owned by the private equity firm Centre Lane Partners.

== History ==
In 2009, Robert Wang and two partners, both former colleagues at Nortel in Ottawa, Ontario, Canada, started what would become Instant Pot. Both partners left, but he was soon joined by friends Yi Qin and Dongjun Wang, who had also previously worked in the region's tech sector, both at BlackBerry (RIM). Robert Wang is credited as the inventor of the Instant Pot. The first model was marketed as a "6-in-1" device and operated as a pressure cooker, slow cooker, rice or porridge cooker, yogurt maker, sauté/searing pan, steamer, and food warmer.

In April 2019 Instant Pot merged with Corelle Brands, owned by a private equity firm Cornell Capital, which owns kitchen brands such as Pyrex, Corelle, Corningware and SnapWare, for an undisclosed amount of money. The Spoon says "(The deal) makes the company the first kitchen tech unicorn of this generation". The merged company was later renamed to Instant Brands.

=== Bankruptcy ===
On June 12, 2023, Instant Brands filed for Chapter 11 bankruptcy after high interest rates and waning access to credit hit its cash position and made its debts unsustainable. In February of 2024, the US Bankruptcy Court for the Southern District of Texas approved the restructuring plan.

In November of 2023, private equity firm Centre Lane Partners acquired the appliance division of Instant Brands, restructuring it to emerge from bankruptcy in March of 2024 as a stand-alone company called Instant Pot Brands.

== Marketing ==
The Instant Pot was an unconventional viral marketing success story, with owners often describing themselves as "addicts" or "cult members." The brand was never advertised on TV or in newspapers, but the word-of-mouth publicity and ardent fans spawned a near-religious devotion. In Nov. 2017, Instant Pot's Facebook group had over 750,000 members. The group gained more than 10,000 members in 30 days from mid-October through mid-November, and had as many as 7,000 posts each day. Robert Wang says that from the beginning the intention was to let the product speak for itself. He called this the "build a better mousetrap, and the world will beat a path to your door" marketing strategy.

Family Guy season 17, episode 15 depicted how Instant Pot fans persuade people to buy an Instant Pot.

On 2016 Amazon Prime Day, Instant Pot was the No. 1 bestselling non-Amazon product in the US. "Members purchased over 215,000 Instant Pot 7-in-1 Multi-Functional Pressure Cookers". On 2017 Amazon Prime Day, Instant Pot was the No. 1 bestseller in the US and Canada. On 2018 Amazon Prime Day, again Instant Pot was No. 1 in the US and Canada. "Members purchased more than 300,000 Instant Pot". Instant Pot is the only third-party product which dominated Amazon Prime Day for three consecutive years.

Smithsonian National Museum of American History exhibition "FOOD: Transforming the American Table 1950–2000" features Instant Pot as multicookers for multitaskers.

Instant Pot is sometimes colloquially referred to as InstaPot. Others use the term instapot for a generic multi-cooker while using the name brand to refer to the specific machine.

== Recalls ==
In July 2015 the Instant Pot Smart-60 cooker was recalled, affecting about 1,140 units in Canada and the United States. The defect caused electric current to leak, which could potentially shock the product's user. There were four reported instances of this shock before it was recalled.

In February 2018, five production runs of Instant Pot Gem 65 8-in-1 Multicookers were recalled because they were overheating and subsequently melting due to a manufacturing defect.

== Models ==
Several different models of the Instant Pot have been sold.

Model	Description
Instant Pot Duo Evo Plus	10-in-1 multi-use programmable pressure cooker
Instant Pot Duo	7-in-1 multi-use programmable pressure cooker
Instant Pot Duo Crisp	11-in-1 multi-use programmable pressure cooker and air fryer
Instant Pot Duo Nova	7-in-1 multi-use programmable pressure cooker
Instant Pot Duo Plus	9-in-1 multi-use programmable pressure cooker
Instant Pot Smart Wifi	Multi-use programmable pressure cooker with control over WiFi
Instant Pot Ultra	10-in-1 multi-use programmable pressure cooker
Instant Pot Lux	6-in-1 multi-use programmable pressure cooker
Instant Pot Max	15psi pressure cooker
Instant Pot Aura	10-in-1 multi-use programmable slow cooker
Instant Pot Aura Pro	10-in-1 multi-use programmable slow cooker
Instant Pot Gem	8-in-1 multicooker
Instant Pot Viva	9-in-1 multi-use programmable pressure cooker
Instant Pot RIO	7-in-1 multi-use programmable pressure cooker
Instant Pot RIO Wide	7-in-1 multi-use programmable pressure cooker
Instant Pot Pro Plus	10-in-1 multi-use programmable pressure cooker with control over WiFi

== See also ==
- List of cooking appliances
- Convenience cooking
