= Instant Brands =

Kitchen appliance company

Instant Pot Brands
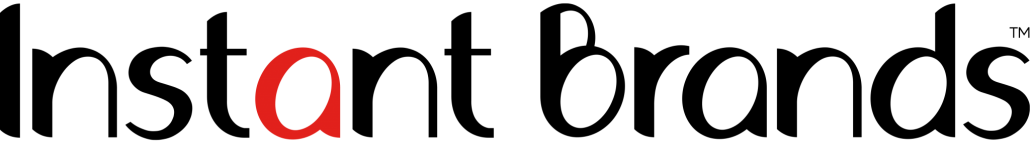
- Formerly: Double Insight Inc. Corelle Brands; Instant Brands
- Type: Private
- Industry: Kitchen appliances
- Founded: 2009; 17 years ago
- Founder: Robert Wang; Yi Qin
- Headquarters: Downers Grove, Illinois, USA
- Products: Instant Pot; Instant Pot Accu; Instant Vortex Air Fryer; Instant Vortex Oven; Instant Ace; Instant Omni
- Brands: Instant Vortex; Instant Pot
- Owner: Centre Lane Partners
- Number of employees: 1800 (2024)
- Website: corporate.instantbrands.com

Instant Pot Brands (formerly Double Insight Inc., Corelle Brands and Instant Brands) is a company selling a range of kitchen appliances. Founded in 2009 by Robert Wang, Yi Qin, and three Canadian partners, it is the distributor and designer of Instant Pot and other products under the Instant Brands name.

Headquartered in Downers Grove, Illinois, the firm and its affiliates design, manufacture and market small kitchen appliances worldwide. Previously, its subsidiaries were merged and consolidated under the name Instant Pot Brands.

The company's original and primary products are electronically controlled, combined pressure cookers and slow cookers. The original cookers are marketed as 6-in-1 or more appliances designed to consolidate the cooking and preparing of food to one device (multicooker). The brand has since expanded to include non-pressure slow cookers, sous-vide immersion circulators, blenders, air fryers, and rice cookers.

== History ==
In 2008, Robert Wang, Yi Qin, and one other friend, all former employees of Nortel in Ottawa, Canada, started working on designs for the Instant Pot. Wang is credited as the inventor of the Instant Pot.

Founded by Wang, Qin, and their friends in 2009 as Double Insight (DI), the company became profitable three years later, with Instant Pot as its main product. In 2016, DI sold more than 215,000 Instant Pots on Amazon's Prime Day.

After the firm reached a merger agreement with Corelle Brands on March 4, 2019, it was reported that Corelle's chief executive would hold the same title at the merged company, while Wang would be its "chief innovative officer". Given this, it would be headquartered in Downers Grove, Illinois and owned by Cornell Capital.

In June 2023, Instant Brands filed for Chapter 11 bankruptcy after high interest rates and waning access to credit hit its cash position and made its debts unsustainable. It sold its appliance business ("Instant" branded products) to the private equity firm Centre Lane Partners (CLP) during bankruptcy. The remaining housewares business exited bankruptcy separately on February 27, 2024 under the prior Corelle Brands moniker.

In November 2023, Instant Pot Brands was established as a standalone company with a new capital structure under new ownership following its purchase by an affiliate of CLP.

In February 2024, the bankruptcy court approved the company's restructuring plan. On April 1, 2024 the company announced it had changed its name and would be doing business as Instant Pot Brands along with the announcement of a new Chief Executive Officer, Chief Financial Officer, Chief Human Resources Officer, and Executive Vice President.

== Products and brands ==
=== Instant Pot ===
The Instant Pot is a Canadian brand of multicookers. The multicookers are electronically controlled, combined pressure cookers and slow cookers.

=== Instant Pot Accu ===
The Instant Pot Accu is a brand of basic and affordable sous-vides sold under the Instant Pot brand.

=== Instant Ace ===
The Instant Ace is a brand of blenders. Products include the Ace, the Ace Nova and the Ace Plus. The blenders feature a digital display that shows the operating temperature along with the remaining cooking time.

=== Instant Omni ===
The Instant Omni and Instant Omni Plus are each a 26L toaster oven.

=== Instant Vortex Oven ===
The Instant Vortex Oven is a convection oven.

=== Instant Vortex Air Fryer ===
The Instant Vortex Air Fryer is a convection oven.
