= Macbeth-Evans Glass Company =

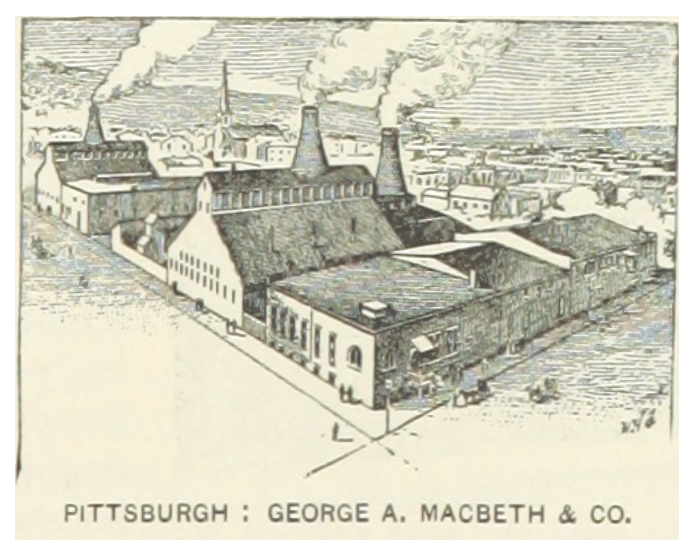
- Industry: Glassware
- Predecessors: Reddick & Company, Muzzy & Company
- Founded: 1899
- Defunct: 1936
- Successors: Corning Incorporated, Corelle Brands, Anchor Hocking
- Headquarters: Pittsburgh, Pennsylvania

The Macbeth-Evans Glass Company was an American glass company that created "almost every kind of glass for illuminating, industrial and scientific purposes."

After the company's purchase in 1936, its factory in Charleroi, Pennsylvania was the main production site for Pyrex dinnerware in the United States until its closure by Anchor Hocking in 2025.

== History ==
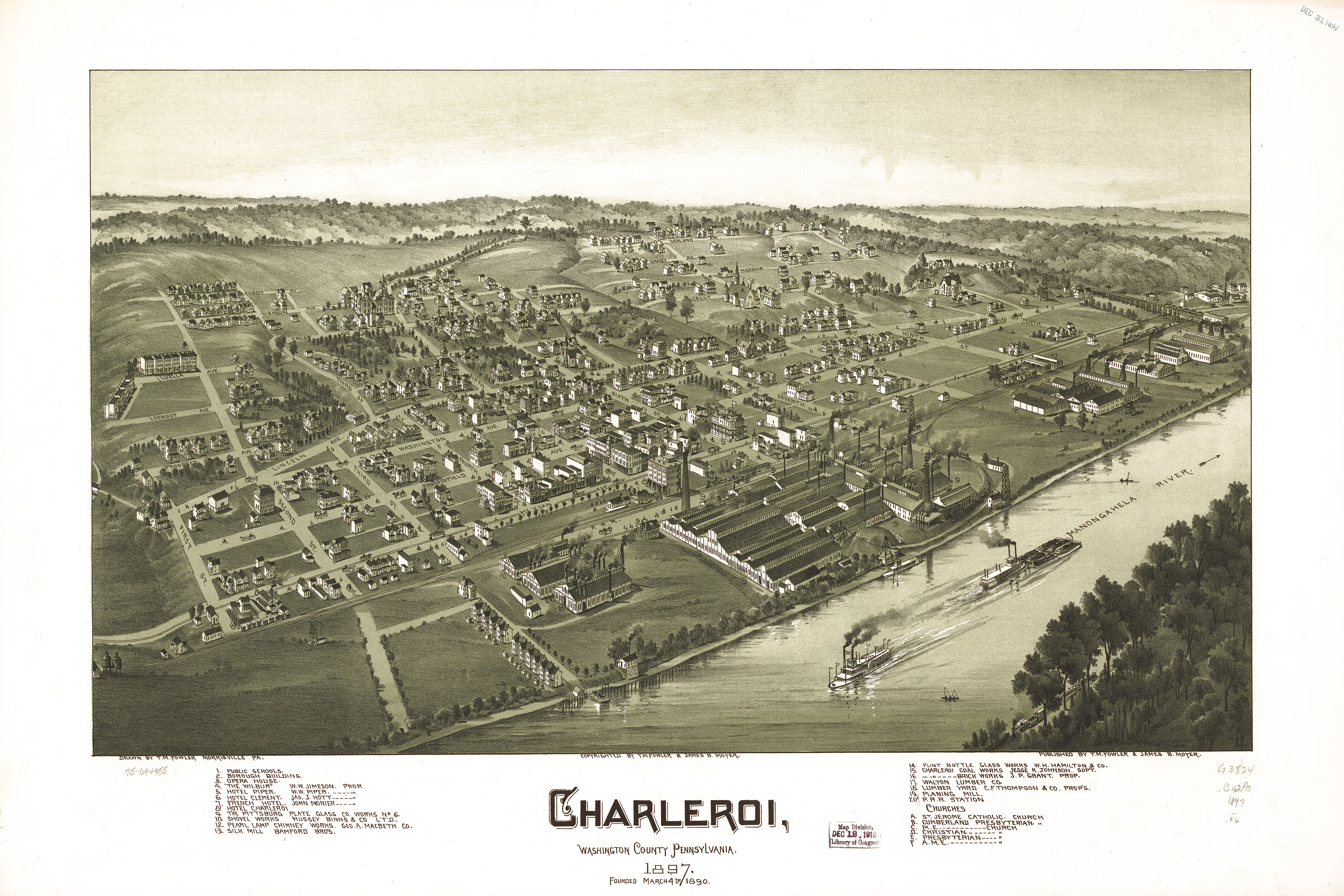
The glass factory that would become the Macbeth-Evans plant is seen along the river in this 1897 illustration of Charleroi, Pennsylvania

The company was established in 1899 after a merger between Reddick & Company, operated by Thomas Evans, and Muzzy & Company, operated by George A. Macbeth.

The Macbeth-Evans Glass Company was based out of Pittsburgh, Pennsylvania, and operated multiple offices in the region, but the most significant glass works was located in Charleroi, Pennsylvania. It quickly absorbed the American Chimney Lamp Company to gain control of M. J. Owens's patents on the Owens glass-blowing machine, as well as Hogans-Evans Company, becoming at the time the largest lamp glass manufacturer in the world.

During World War I, most of the company's production was dedicated to producing glass for the army and navy, particularly reflectors for searchlights.

=== Corning ===
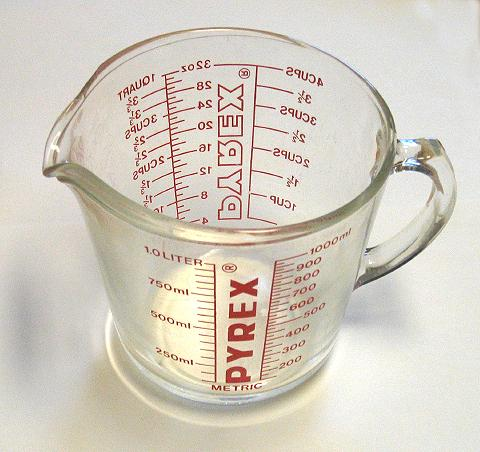
Pyrex measuring cup manufactured at the Charleroi factory

The company was bought by Corning Glass Works in 1936, and it continued to operate as the "Corning Glass Works Macbeth-Evans Division" and then later as the "Macbeth-Evans Division of Corning Glass Works in Charleroi, Pennsylvania."

The Charleroi plant functioned as one of Corelle's main glassware manufacturing sites and was the site of production for Pyrex dinnerware in the United States.

=== Corelle ===
After Corning Incorporated spun off its consumer products division in 1998, the plant was taken over by the newly formed World Kitchen, later renamed Corelle Brands.

Corelle Brands filed for Chapter 11 bankruptcy in 2023 after its debts became unsustainable. The company emerged from bankruptcy after it was purchased by private equity firm Centre Lane Partners, one of the largest stockholders in Pyrex rival Anchor Hocking.

After the purchase was finalized in early 2024, Centre Lane transferred ownership of Corelle to Anchor Hocking. This arrangement came into public awareness later in the year after Anchor Hocking announced that they planned to close the former Macbeth-Evans factory in Charleroi and relocate glass production to Anchor Hocking's factory in Lancaster, Ohio. Senators Bob Casey Jr. and John Fetterman each criticized the move and demanded an explanation for how the merger of two major competitors was able to proceed without Federal Trade Commission oversight.

A lawsuit by the State of Pennsylvania against Centre Lane Partners that attempted to halt the factory closure was dismissed by a federal judge. After months of uncertainty and multiple temporary closures, Anchor Hocking permanently closed the Charleroi factory in April 2025.

== Products ==
=== Tableware ===
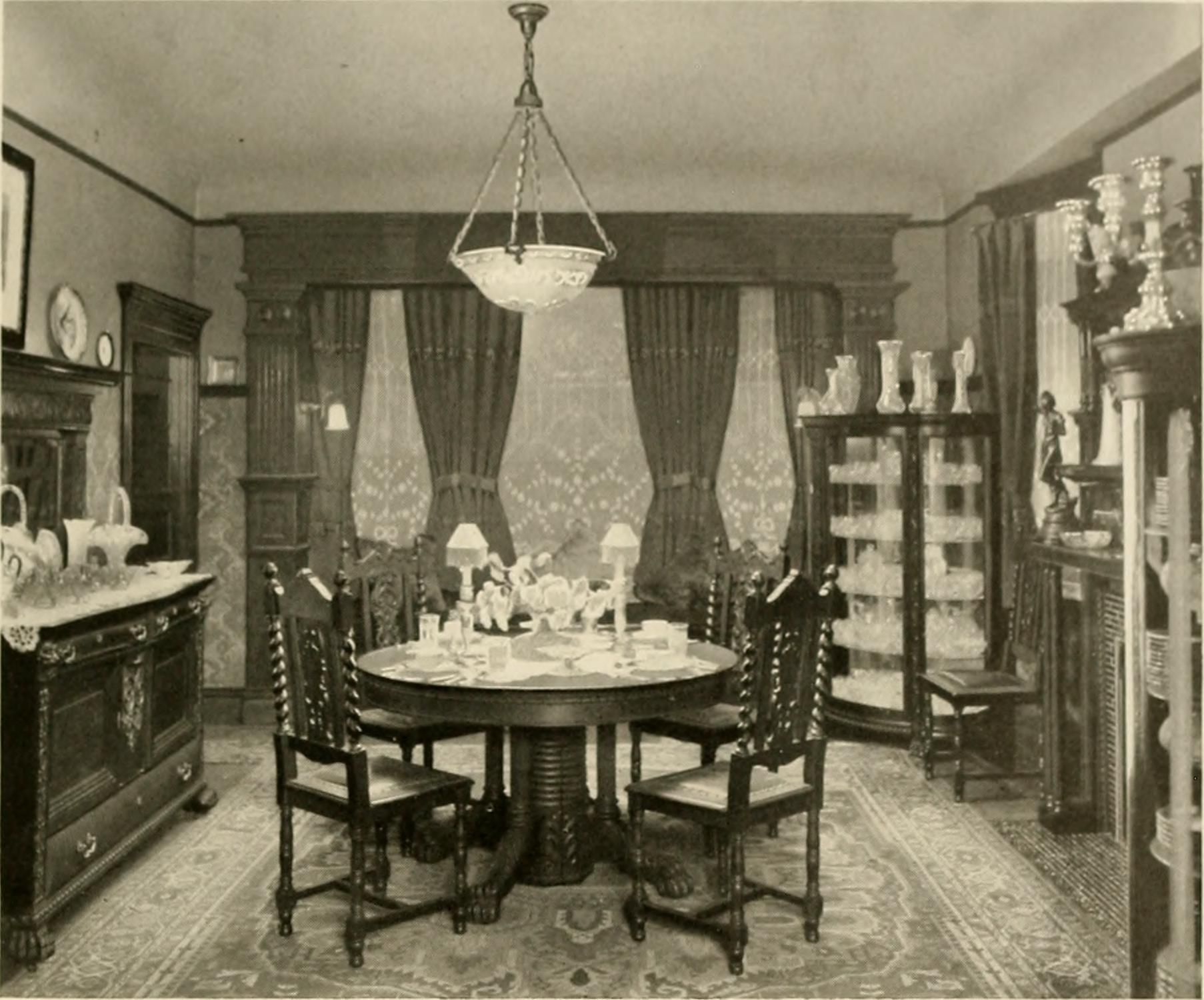
A dining room furnished with shades and globes, 1912

Macbeth-Evans first introduced tableware items during the late 1920s and expanded into complete dinnerware lines in 1930. The most popular color used in tableware was pink, and the glass made was thinner than other companies of the time, thus more fragile. No candy jars, candle holders, cookie jars, or butter dishes were made by Macbeth-Evans. Pattern names were referred to by letter. Ruby red and Ritz blue colors were used in the 1930s glassware, beginning with the American Sweetheart pattern.

Some of the patterns Macbeth-Evans created were:

- Petalware (1930-1940s) was among the first tableware pattern released by Macbeth-Evans and was initially produced in crystal and pink. This pattern had one of the longest production runs among Depression glass. After Corning acquired Macbeth-Evans, they continued the petalware line with added colors and decorations.
- American Sweetheart (1930-1936) was produced in pale pink and translucent white (Monax), with dessert sets produced in ruby red, Ritz blue, and crystal. The pattern was an elaborate design of lacy swirls, finely detailed and quite feminine, created from a mold-etched pattern. The translucent white, when held up to the light, had a faint bluish hue to it. This unique colored glass is called "Monax" and is sometimes mistaken as milk glass, which is thicker and whiter. American Sweetheart's Monax dishware is thinner, more opaque, and appears to be more delicate. Plates, saucers, bowls, sugar and creamer sets, salt and pepper sets, tumblers, pitchers were created with this pattern. The dessert sets included plates, cups, saucers, sugar and creamer sets, console bowls, and tid-bit sets. American Sweetheart was referred to as the R-pattern.
- Chinex Classic (1930s-40s) is one of the most elegant Depression glass patterns and fits in with most fine china sets with an elaborately scrolled lacy pattern. Some patterns also have impressions of florals and castles.
- Dogwood (1930–1932), sometimes called Apple Blossom or Wild Rose, is a deep mold pressed delicate pattern that has attracted many collectors of Depression glass. A set of green can be obtained in this pattern, but the pink color is more commonly found and much easier to acquire. Other colors, listed above, are very hard to find and there are not enough pieces to put together an entire set.
- Crystal Leaf (1928) is in pink, green, and crystal colors and is a pattern with stylized leaves bordering the bottom and flowing up over the pieces made. Pieces include a tankard style jug, a fancy kitchen pitcher, a 5 oz. tumbler, a 9 oz. tumbler, and 12 oz. tumbler. This pattern was made for both bedroom and kitchen use.
