= Joshua Correll =

- Born: Joshua Raphael Correll
- Education: University of Colorado Boulder
- Known for: Racial bias research
- Scientific career
- Fields: Social psychology
- Workplaces: University of Colorado Boulder
- Thesis: Context, race and danger: The relationship between threat perception and the decision to shoot. (2005)
- Doctoral advisor: Bernadette Park

Joshua "Josh" Correll is an American social psychologist and associate professor in the Department of Psychology and Neuroscience at the University of Colorado Boulder.

== Education and career ==
Correll received his Ph.D. from the University of Colorado-Boulder in 2005 under the supervision of Bernadette Park. He became an assistant professor at the University of Chicago the same year. In August 2012, he joined the University of Colorado-Boulder as associate professor.

== Research ==
Correll is known for studying the psychology of racial bias, especially as it pertains to police shootings. For example, he was the lead author of a 2007 study which showed that police officers' decisions to shoot were less influenced by the race of a suspect than were those of civilians. The study had 157 Denver police officers, 113 police officers from other parts of the country, and 245 Denver-area civilians play a video game which simulated confrontations with armed and unarmed individuals of various races.
