= Pyrex =

Brand of glassware

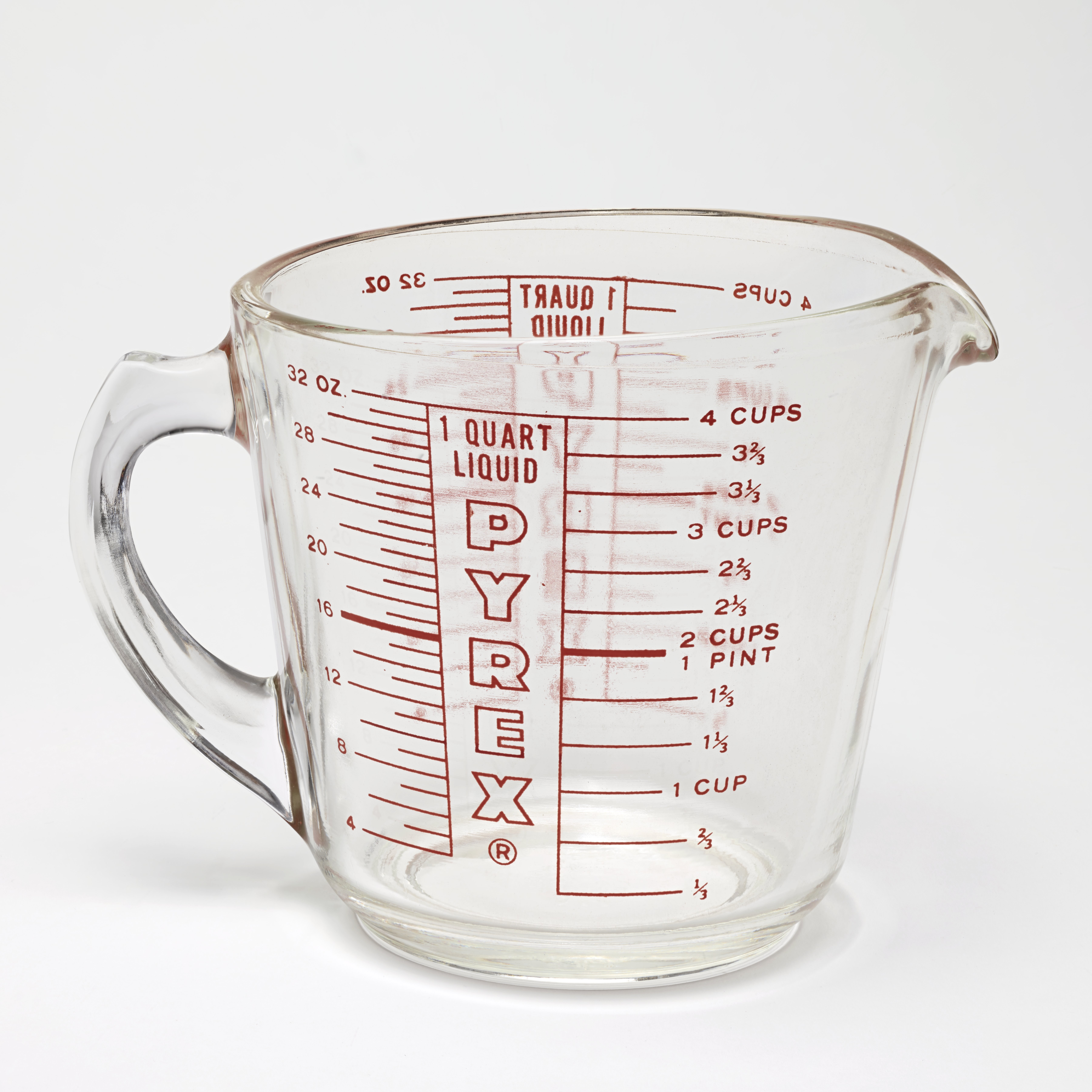
A PYREX 1-quart measuring cup manufactured after 1940, featuring graduations in United States customary units

Pyrex (trademarked as PYREX and pyrex) is a type of borosilicate glass developed by Corning Incorporated in 1908. Pyrex was first introduced to the public in 1915, as a brand of clear, low-thermal-expansion glassware products, whose resistance to chemicals, electricity, and heat made it ideal for laboratory glassware and kitchenware. In the 1930s, Corning expanded the brand to include kitchen products made of soda–lime glass and other materials.

In 1998, Corning Incorporated spun off its kitchenware division, including Pyrex cookware. Currently, Pyrex dishes are manufactured by Corelle Brands in the United States and International Cookware in Europe. Corning Incorporated continues to manufacture Pyrex scientific glassware.

== History ==
=== Corning Glass Works ===
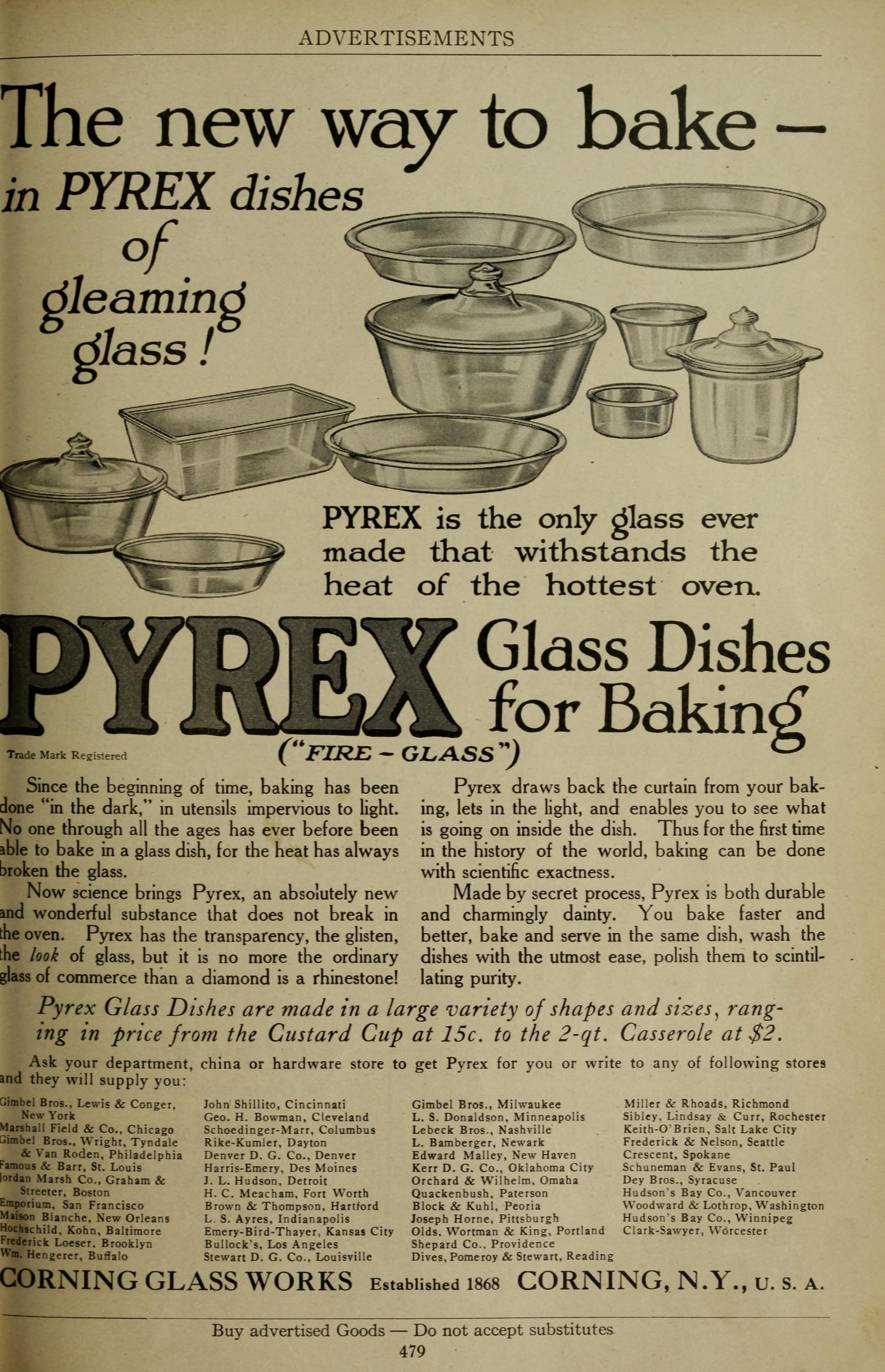
1915 Pyrex advertisement

Borosilicate glass was first made by German chemist and glass technologist Otto Schott, founder of Schott AG in 1893.

Eugene Sullivan, director of research at Corning Glass Works, had learned about Schott's borosilicate glass while studying as a doctoral student in Leipzig, Germany. In 1908, Sullivan, along with Corning scientists William Churchill and George Hollister, developed a low-expansion glass, able to withstand dramatic temperature changes, for use in railroad signal lanterns and other industrial products such as battery jars. The called it Nonex - short for "non-expanding".

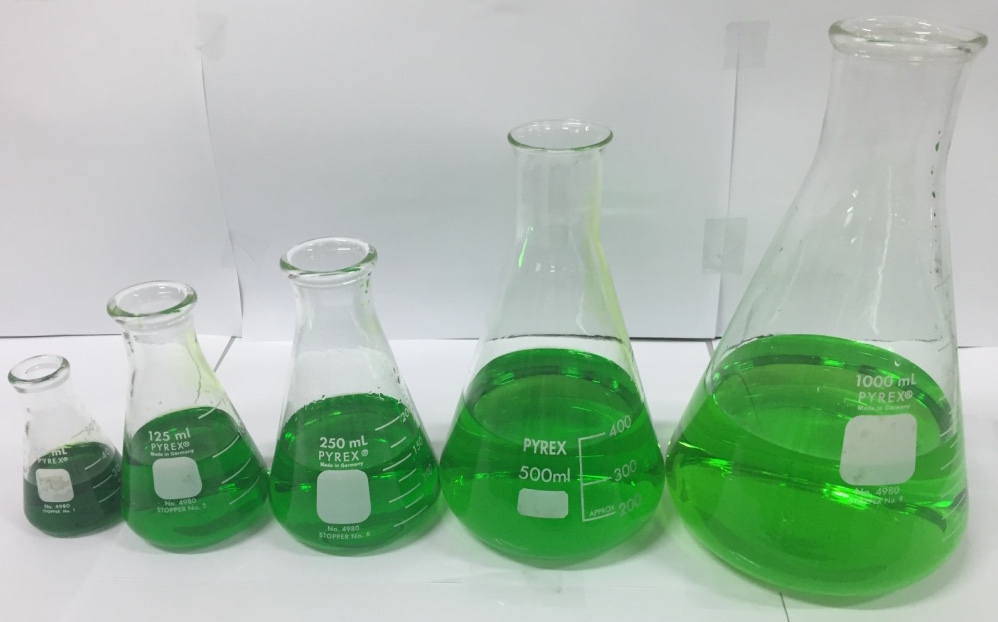
A series of Pyrex Erlenmeyer flasks

Following this breakthrough, Corning was seeking additional markets for this glass. Jesse Littleton, another scientist at Corning, discovered the cooking potential of borosilicate glass by giving his wife Bessie Littleton a cut-down Nonex battery jar to test out as a casserole dish after her ceramic one shattered in the oven; it proved very successful. Corning removed the lead from Nonex and developed its first consumer product, a pie plate. Pyrex made its public debut in 1915 during World War I and was positioned as an American-made alternative to the German-made Duran.

The material was initially marketed for pie pans and advertised as "Pie Right" or "Py-Right", but the name was eventually changed to Pyrex to rhyme with Nonex. A Corning executive gave the following account of the etymology of the name "Pyrex":

The word PYREX is probably a purely arbitrary word which was devised in 1915 as a trade-mark for products manufactured and sold by Corning Glass Works. While some people have thought that it was made up from the Greek pyr and the Latin rex, we have always taken the position that no graduate of Harvard would be guilty of such a classical hybrid. Actually, we had a number of prior trade-marks ending in the letters ex. One of the first commercial products to be sold under the new mark was a pie plate, and in the interests of euphonism the letter r was inserted between pie and ex and the whole thing condensed to PYREX.

Corning purchased the Macbeth-Evans Glass Company in 1936 and their Charleroi, Pennsylvania, plant was used to produce Pyrex opal ware bowls and bakeware made of tempered soda–lime glass. In 1958 an internal design department was started by John B. Ward. He redesigned the Pyrex ovenware and Flameware. Over the years, designers such as Penny Sparke, Betty Baugh, Smart Design, TEAMS Design, and others have contributed to the design of the line.

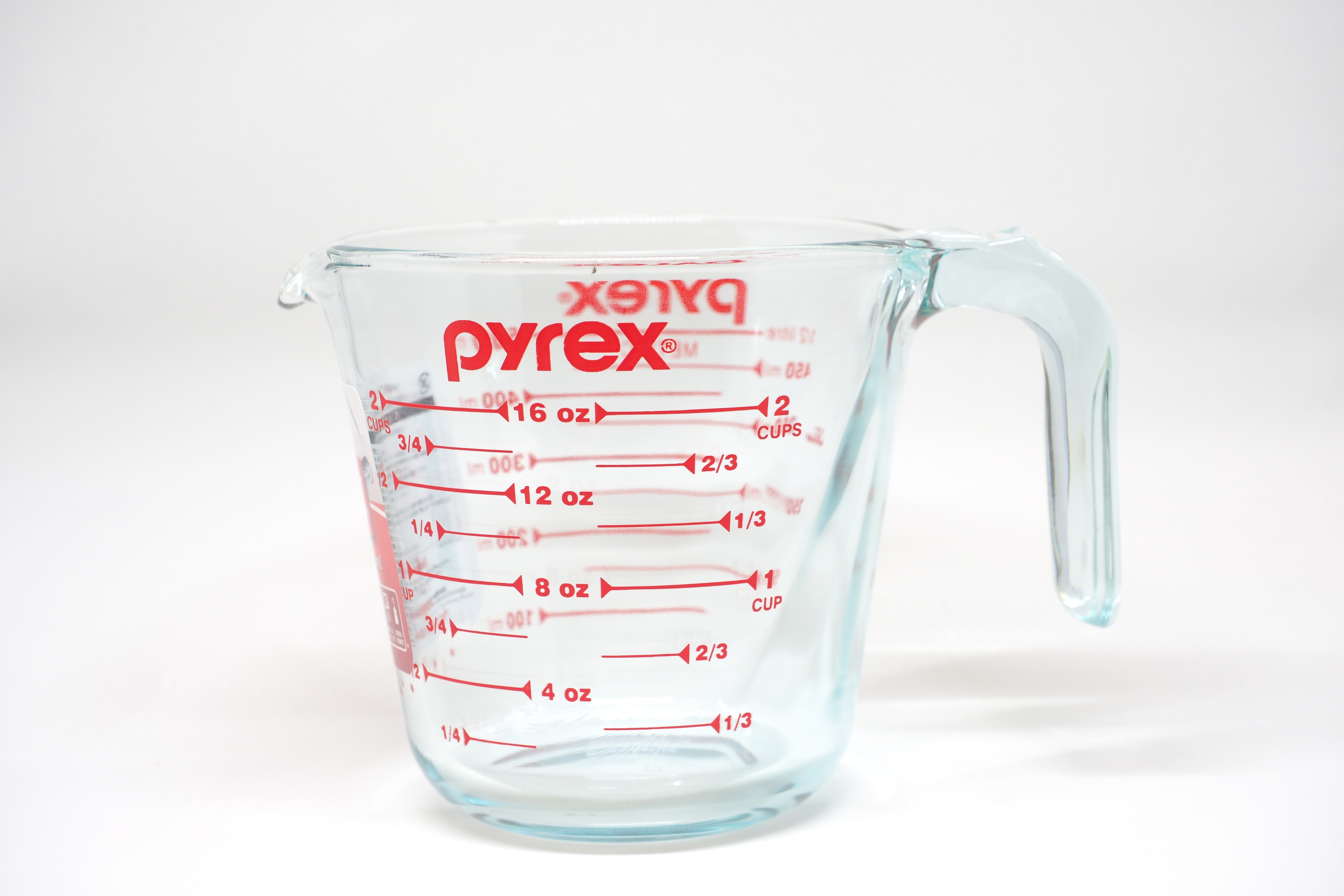
A 2-cup pyrex measuring jug manufactured by Corelle.

=== Corelle Brands ===
In 1998 Corning Incorporated divested itself of its consumer products division, which was renamed World Kitchen in 2000, and Corelle Brands in 2018. Corelle took over production of Pyrex and other Corningware products in the United States.

In 2019 Corelle Brands merged with Instant Brands, the makers of the Instant Pot. The combined company filed for Chapter 11 bankruptcy in 2023 after high interest rates and waning access to credit hit its cash position and made its debts unsustainable. The company emerged from bankruptcy after the appliance portion (Instant Brands) and the housewares portion (Corelle Brands) of the business were separately purchased by private equity firm Centre Lane Partners, one of the largest stockholders in Pyrex rival Anchor Hocking.

After the purchase was finalized in early 2024, Centre Lane transferred ownership of Corelle to Anchor Hocking. This arrangement came into public awareness later in the year after Anchor Hocking announced that they planned to close Pyrex's 132-year old factory in Charleroi, Pennsylvania, and relocate production to Anchor Hocking's factory in Lancaster, Ohio. Senators Bob Casey Jr. and John Fetterman each criticized the move and demanded an explanation for how the merger of two major competitors was able to proceed without Federal Trade Commission oversight.

A lawsuit by the State of Pennsylvania against Centre Lane Partners that attempted to halt the factory closure was dismissed by a federal judge. After months of uncertainty and multiple temporary closures, Anchor Hocking permanently closed the Charleroi factory in April 2025.

=== European history ===
After Corning Incorporated divested itself of its consumer products division in 1998, Newell Cookware Europe retained its license to produce Pyrex in Europe, Africa, and the Middle East.

France-based cookware maker Arc International acquired Newell's European business in early 2006 to own rights to the brand in Europe, the Middle East and Africa. In 2007, Arc closed the Pyrex soda–lime factory in Sunderland, UK moving all European production to France. The Sunderland factory had first started making Pyrex in 1922.

Arc International sold off its Arc International Cookware division including Pyrex business in 2014, and the division was subsequently renamed the International Cookware group. London-based private equity firm Kartesia purchased International Cookware in 2020.

In 2021, International Cookware acquired Pyrex rival Duralex for €3.5 million (US$4.2m).

== Trademark ==
Pyrex logo as used by Corelle

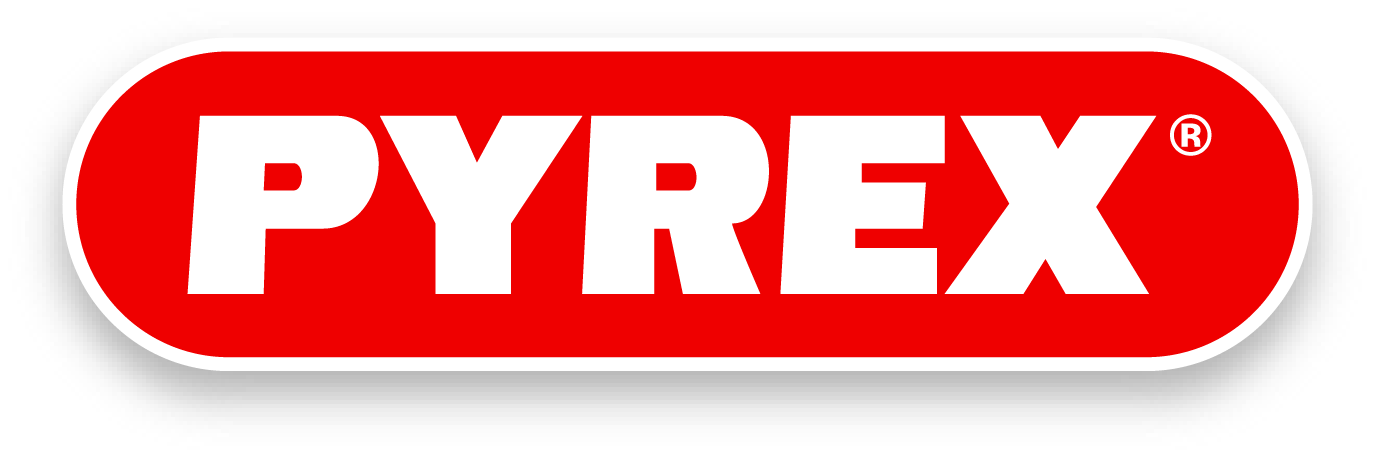
Pyrex logo as used by International Cookware

Pyrex remains a trademark of Corning Incorporated, but is licensed by two dinnerware manufacturers.

Corning Incorporated continues to manufacture PYREX (all uppercase) laboratory glassware for international markets. The pyrex (all lowercase, introduced in 1975) trademark is now used for kitchenware sold in the United States, South America, Asia, and Australia.

In Europe, Africa, and the Middle East, a variation of the PYREX (all uppercase) trademark is licensed by International Cookware.

== Composition ==
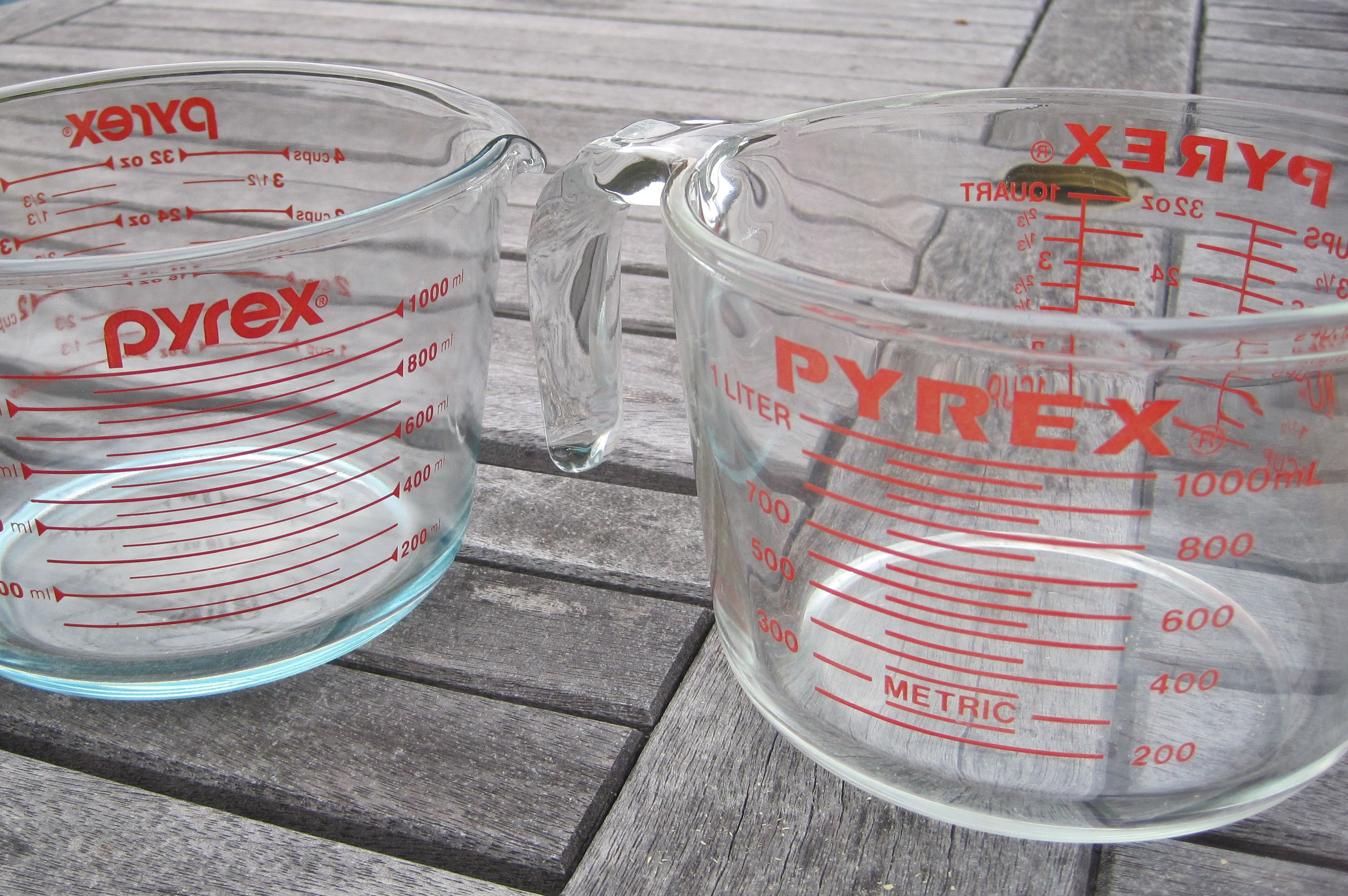
A clear tempered pyrex soda–lime glass measuring jug produced by Instant Brands (left, differentiated by its different logo and bluish tint), and a clear borosilicate glass PYREX measuring jug produced by Corning (right)

Older clear-glass Pyrex manufactured by Corning, International Cookware's Pyrex products, and Pyrex laboratory glassware are made of borosilicate glass. According to the National Institute of Standards and Technology, borosilicate Pyrex is composed of (as percentage of weight): 4.0% boron, 54.0% oxygen, 2.8% sodium, 1.1% aluminium, 37.7% silicon, and 0.3% potassium.

According to glass supplier Pulles and Hannique, borosilicate Pyrex is made of Corning 7740 glass and is equivalent in formulation to Schott Glass 8330 glass sold under the "Duran" brand name. Data sheets for Corning 7740 give its composition (approximate percentages) as 80.6% SiO_{2}, 13.0% B_{2}O_{3}, 4.0% Na_{2}O, 2.3% Al_{2}O_{3}, and 0.1% miscellaneous traces. Schott 8330 data sheets list its composition (again with approximate percentages) as 81% SiO_{2}, 13% B_{2}O_{3}, 3.5% Na_{2}O, 2% Al_{2}O_{3}, and 0.5% K_{2}O.

Starting around the 1950s, Corning began making Pyrex out of thermally tempered soda–lime glass, instead of borosilicate glass, due to lower manufacturing costs. Some plants moved to tempered soda–lime formulations, while others continued to produce borosilicate Pyrex. Herb Dann, a designer at Corning from 1961 to the 1990s, noted that by the time the consumer products division was sold in 1998, Corning had mostly switched to soda–lime glass for "almost all" of its tableware products. The exception to this was the 13"×9"×2" pan, which was never produced with soda–lime.

Phil Ross, an independent consultant to the glass industry, whose clients included World Kitchen, said in 2008 that the U.S. industry as a whole switched in the 1980s from borosilicate to soda–lime owing to it being easier to melt and work with, as well as being more environmentally friendly due to lower emissions from the glass furnace used. He noted it was not economical for companies to install multi-million dollar filter systems. This change was justified by stating that soda–lime glass has higher mechanical strength than borosilicate—it has around twice the strength—making it more resistant to physical damage when dropped, which is believed to be the most common cause of breakage in glass bakeware. However, its thermal shock resistance is lower than borosilicate's, leading to potential breakage from heat stress if used contrary to recommendations. Borosilicate's shock resistance is around three times higher than soda–lime.

Calculations of thermal differential, ∆T, for soda lime silicate and borosilicate glass.
Source	∆T Soda lime silicate	∆T Pyrex borosilicate
Bradt and Martens	~55°C (99°F)	~183°C (330°F)
Carter and Norton	~80°C (144°F)	~270°C (436°F)
Corning brochure	~16°C (29°F)	~54°C (97°F)

The differences between Pyrex-branded glass products has also led to controversy regarding safety issues—in 2008, the U.S. Consumer Product Safety Commission reported it had received 66 complaints by users reporting that their Pyrex glassware had shattered over the prior ten years yet concluded that Pyrex glass bakeware does not present a safety concern. The consumer affairs magazine Consumer Reports investigated the issue and released test results, in January 2011, confirming that borosilicate glass bakeware was less susceptible to thermal shock breakage than tempered soda lime bakeware. They admitted their testing conditions were "contrary to instructions" provided by the manufacturer. STATS analyzed the data available and found that the most common way that users were injured by glassware was via mechanical breakage, being hit or dropped, and that "the change to soda lime represents a greater net safety benefit."

=== Distinguishing soda–lime and borosilicate Pyrex ===
It is a common misconception that the logo style alone indicates the type of glass used to manufacture the bakeware. In reality, Corning's introduction of soda–lime based Pyrex in the 1940s predates the introduction of the all lowercase logo by around 30 years, which first appeared in 1975. Additionally, the transition to soda–lime was not uniform, as some plants continued to produce borosilicate pieces for a period of time, though was generally phased out by 1998. This means any Pyrex manufactured in the U.S. from the 1940s to 1998 could be either borosilicate or soda–lime, regardless of the capitalization of the logo. The Corning Museum of Glass website summarizes: "The short answer is that the change from upper to lower case signified a re-branding of the trademark Pyrex® in the late 1970s but is not a conclusive way to determine, historically, what type of glass formulation the product is made from."

==== Visual differences ====
When asked about any visual differences, Corning designer Herb Dann noted in a 2014 interview: "Actually, the tempered [soda-lime] is a little bluer glass, it can alter the color of it. In fact, at one time we actually had a straw color in all of the Pyrex line. Today when you walk into the company store, it's all blue and that's a cheaper glassmelt because they're not purifying, they're not taking the cobalt out. So it's a cheaper melt, but it's all tempered lime." The U.S. Pyrex website notes: "You may notice that some of our Pyrex® brand glassware has a slight tint of green or blue hue to the dish. It is not a coating or added color. It comes from the raw materials in the glass itself. The blue comes from adding cobalt to the raw materials. This does not affect the performance of the dish; it is purely cosmetic."

==== U.S. post–1998 ====
From 1998, World Kitchen (Later Corelle Brands, then Anchor Hocking) used the Corning soda–lime formulation at their plant in Charleroi, Pennsylvania. The plant was shut down in April 2025, after 132 years of operation. Production was then shifted to Lancaster, Ohio by new owners Anchor Hocking. Ultimately, production of all U.S. Pyrex since 1998 has been made of soda–lime glass with the lowercase logo.

==== England ====
In 1921, James A Jobling acquired the licence to produce Pyrex in the UK. The original kiln was replaced with a borosilicate furnace to create the Pyrex. Production started in 1922 at his Sunderland factory in England, and continued for over 50 years. In 1973, the licence expired, and Corning took control of the factory and the Jobling company. Pyrex produced before Corning took over was stamped with a "JAJ" symbol. Production at the facility took place until 2007 when it was shut down, and production of Pyrex was shifted to France. All Pyrex made at the factory was borosilicate.

==== France ====
Production in France began in 1922 with the glassblowers Clovis and Léon Régent at the Bagneaux-sur-Loing glassworks. Production continued for several years until the factory was relocated to Châteauroux in 1970 where it continues as of 2026. All Pyrex made at the factory is borosilicate with the uppercase logo.

==== Australia ====
Australian Pyrex is distributed by Corelle Brands, who offer the lowercase soda–lime glass. However, they also offer the French-made borosilicate glass. Additionally, borosilicate glass with the lowercase logo is offered in the "Bake N Serve" and "Cook N Serve" ranges which are produced in China.

Previously, Pyrex was produced in Australia by Crown Crystal Glass from 1926. Many pieces were labelled with various stamps, or lacking stamps entirely. Stamps used included "Crown Agee Pyrex" in the mid 1960s, "Agee Pyrex" until 1969–70, "Crown Ovenware" in the mid 1970s, "Pyrex Ovenware" in the mid to late 1970s and "Pyrex Australia" in the late 1970s and 1980s. Crown Crystal Glass also distributed Pyrex-branded goods sourced from the United Kingdom and United States.

== Patterns and collecting ==
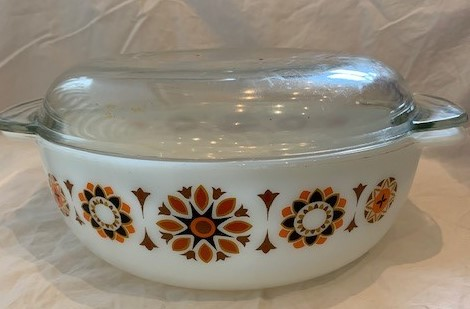
Pyrex casserole dish with the 'Toledo' pattern

Pyrex has achieved somewhat of a cult following through its various colours and patterns produced after World War II, lending itself to collectors. Some valuable patterns include the 1956 Pink Daisy or the 1983 Colonial Mist. Depending on condition, prices can range from $100 for single pieces to $500 for a collection, according to flea market expert Nicolas Martin. Some pieces have sold for several thousand dollars on eBay. Uncommon shapes or limited-run productions also affect the value of the pieces.

== Use in telescopes ==
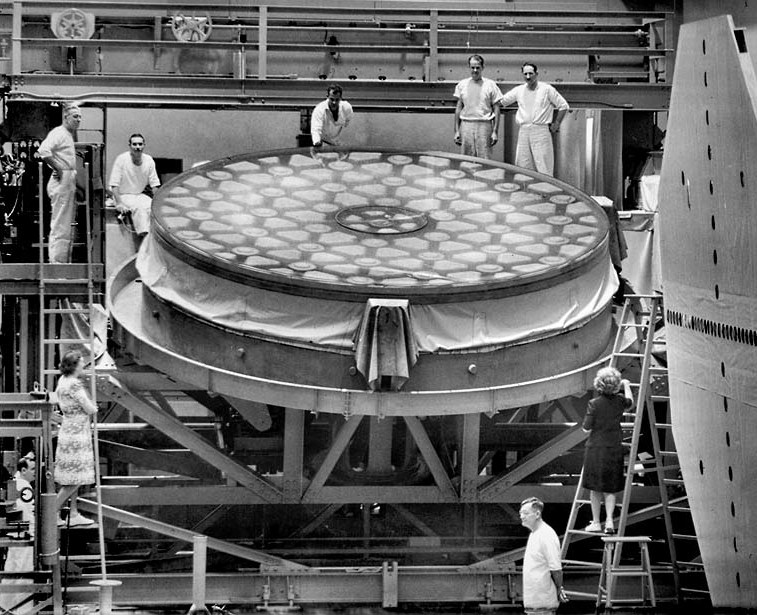
Pyrex glass used on the mirror of the Hale Telescope

Because of its low expansion characteristics, borosilicate glass is often the material of choice for reflective optics in astronomy applications.

In 1932, George Ellery Hale approached Corning with the challenge of fabricating the 200-inch (5.1 m) telescope mirror for the California Institute of Technology's Palomar Observatory project. A previous effort to fabricate the optic from fused quartz had failed, with the cast blank having voids. The mirror was cast by Corning during 1934–1936 out of borosilicate glass. After a year of cooling, during which it was almost lost to a flood, the blank was completed in 1935. The first blank now resides in the Corning Museum of Glass.

== Gallery ==
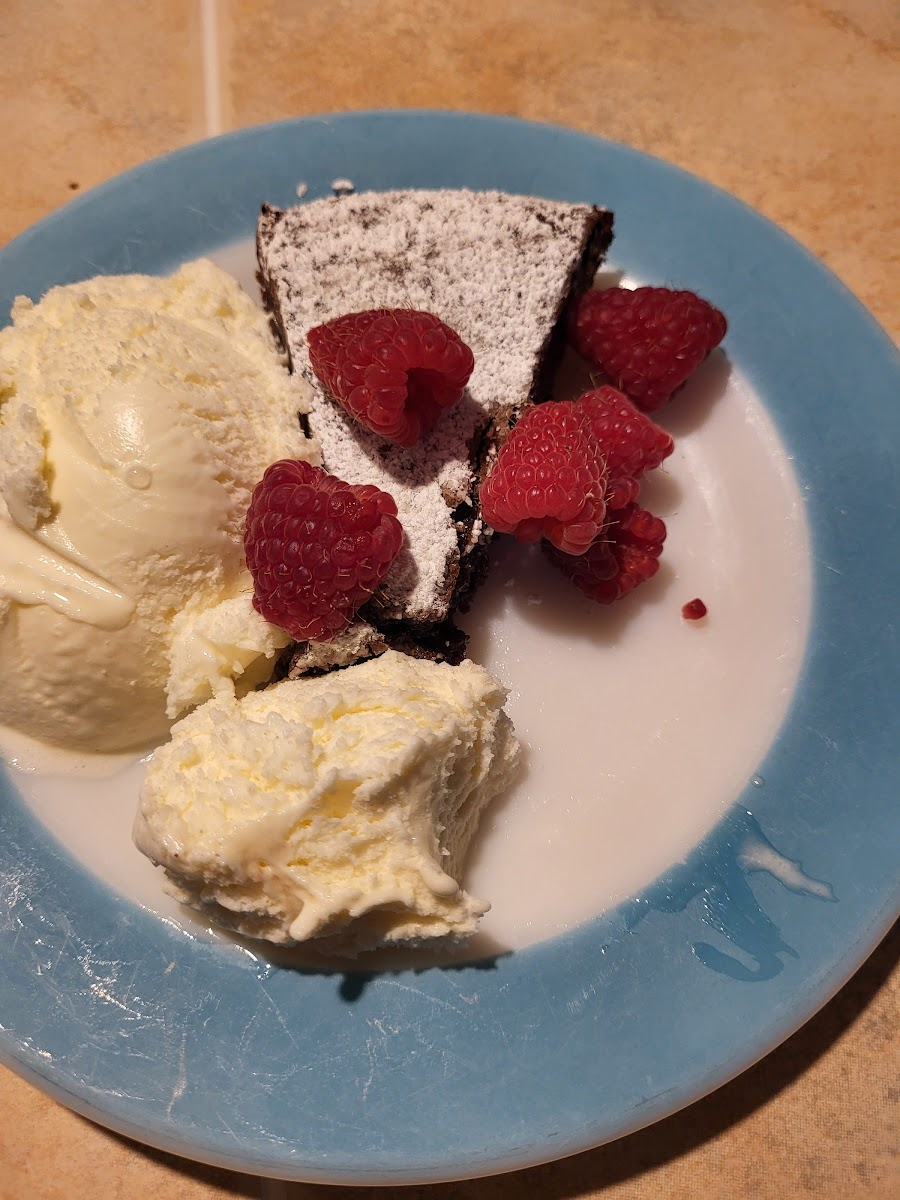
A Pyrex plate manufactured in the 1960s

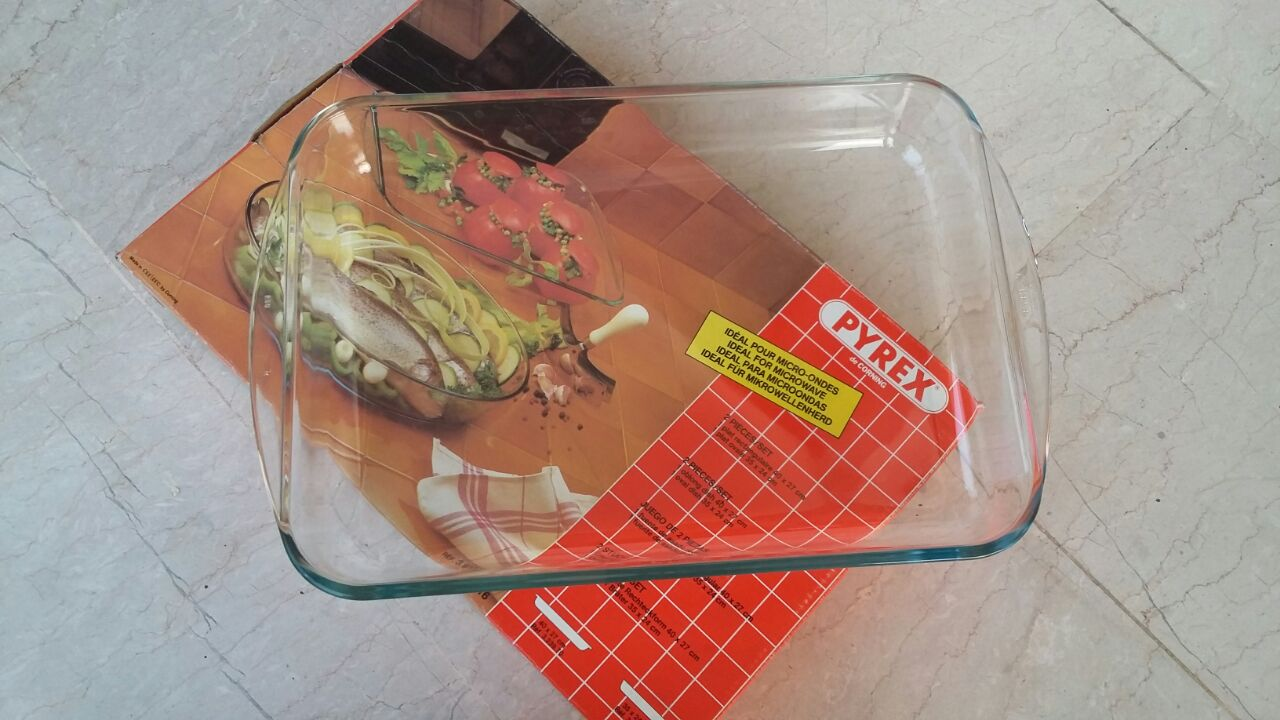
A vintage Pyrex roaster

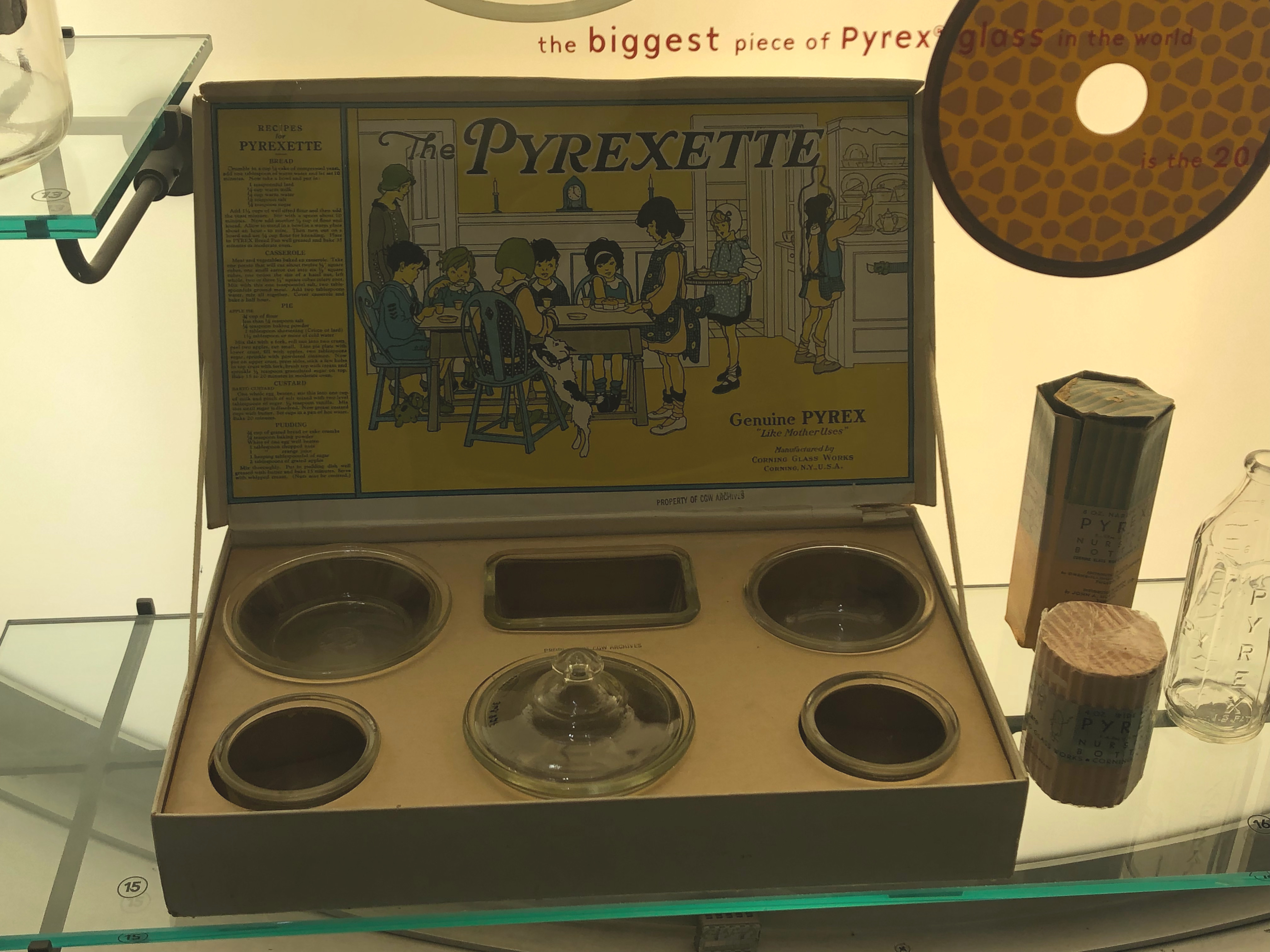
A 1925 Pyrex glass baking dish set for children

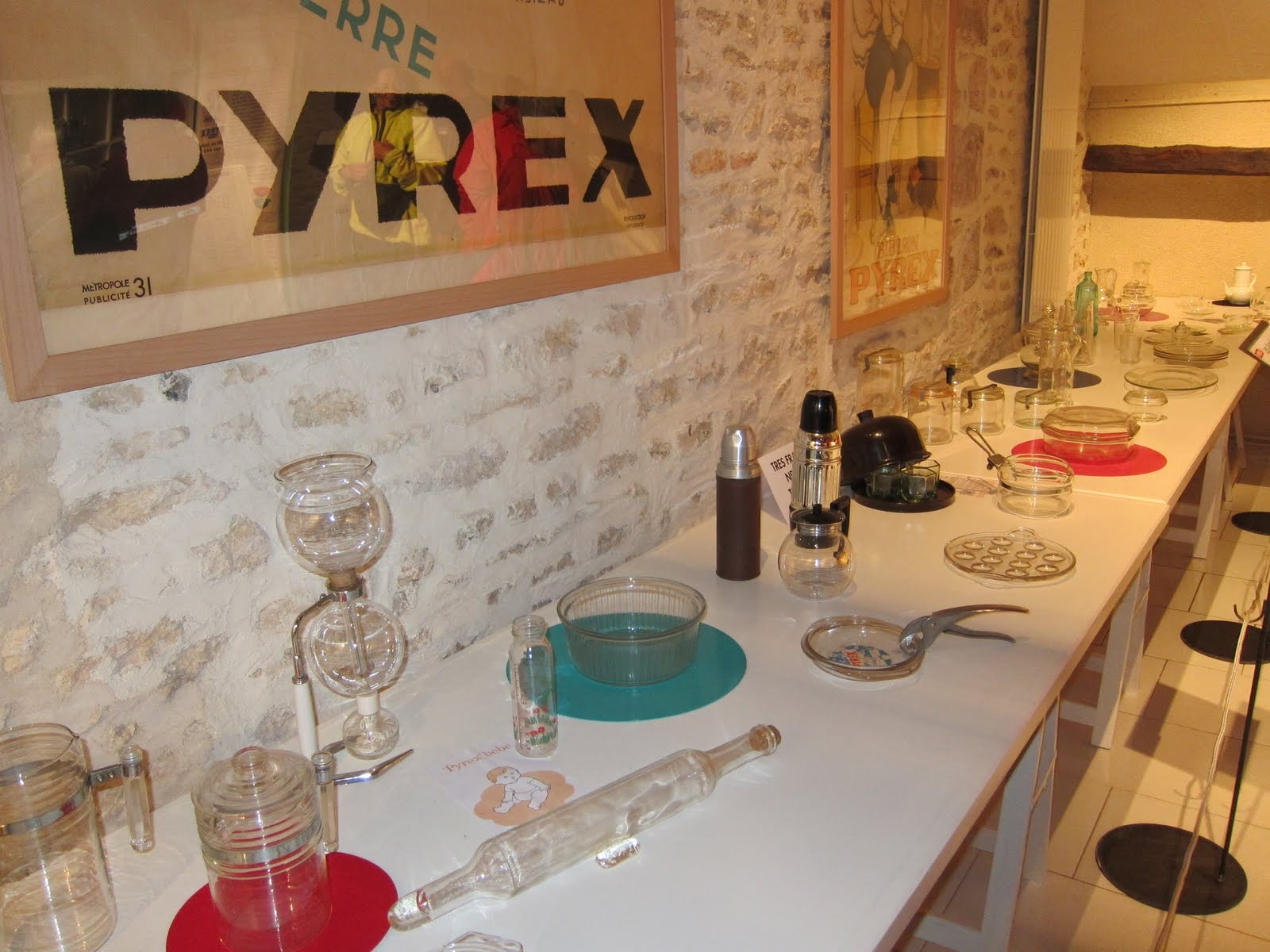
Pyrex exhibit in the Corning Museum of Glass

== See also ==
- Jena glass
- Borosilicate glass
- Gorilla Glass
- Vycor

== General and cited references ==
- Bradt, R. C.; Martens, R. L. (September 2012). "Shattering Glass Cookware" (PDF). American Ceramic Society Bulletin. 91 (7): 35–41. ISSN 0002-7812. OCLC 302290362.
  - DeGuire, Ellen (September 11, 2012). "New Paper Addresses Causes of Shattering Glass Cookware; Margin of Safety Described as 'Borderline'" (Press release). American Ceramic Society. "Their investigation confirmed the borosilicate glass would withstand a much larger rapid temperature change. According to their calculation and those of others, soda lime glass cookware shatters more frequently because, in theory, it can only resist fracture stress for temperature differentials less than about 55 °C (99 °F). In contrast, they estimate that the borosilicate glassware could tolerate a temperature differential of about 183 °C (330 °F), a three-fold difference."
- Gantz, Carroll (2001). Design Chronicles: Significant Mass-produced Products of the 20th Century. Atglen, PA: Schiffer Publishing. ISBN 978-0-7643-2223-5. OCLC 58729534.
- Rogove, Susan Tobier; Steinhauer, Marcia B. (1993). Pyrex by Corning: A Collector's Guide. Marietta, Ohio: Antique Publications. ISBN 0-915410-94-X. OCLC 28440879.
- Rogove, Susan Tobier (2016). More Pyrex by Corning: A Collector's Guide. Photography: Jay Kogut Photography. Pennsauken, NJ: BookBaby. ISBN 978-1-4835-8646-5. OCLC 963732418.
