= Multicooker =

Multi use electric pot cooking appliance

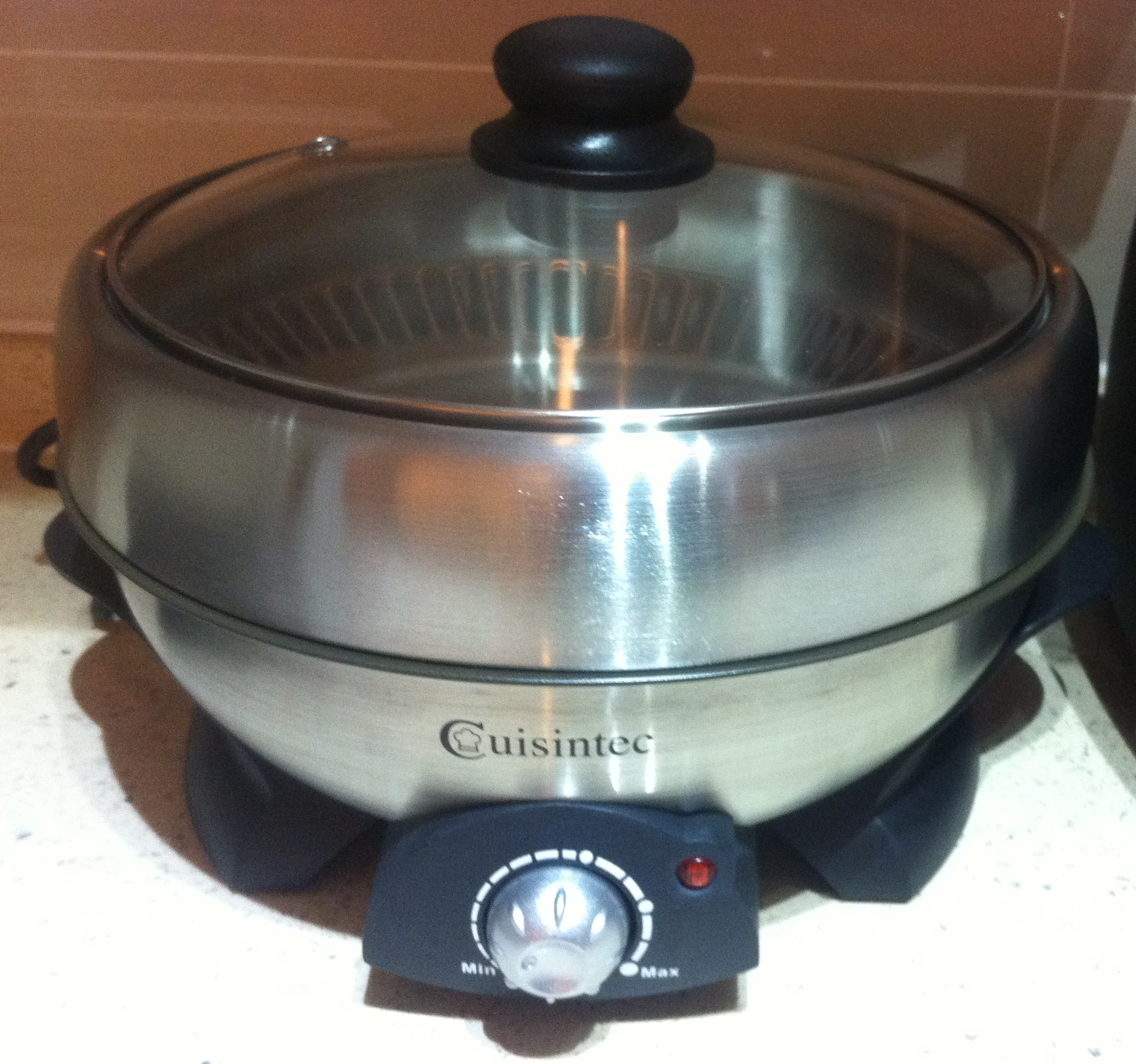
A Cuisintec-brand "Mini Shabu Shabu" manual multicooker

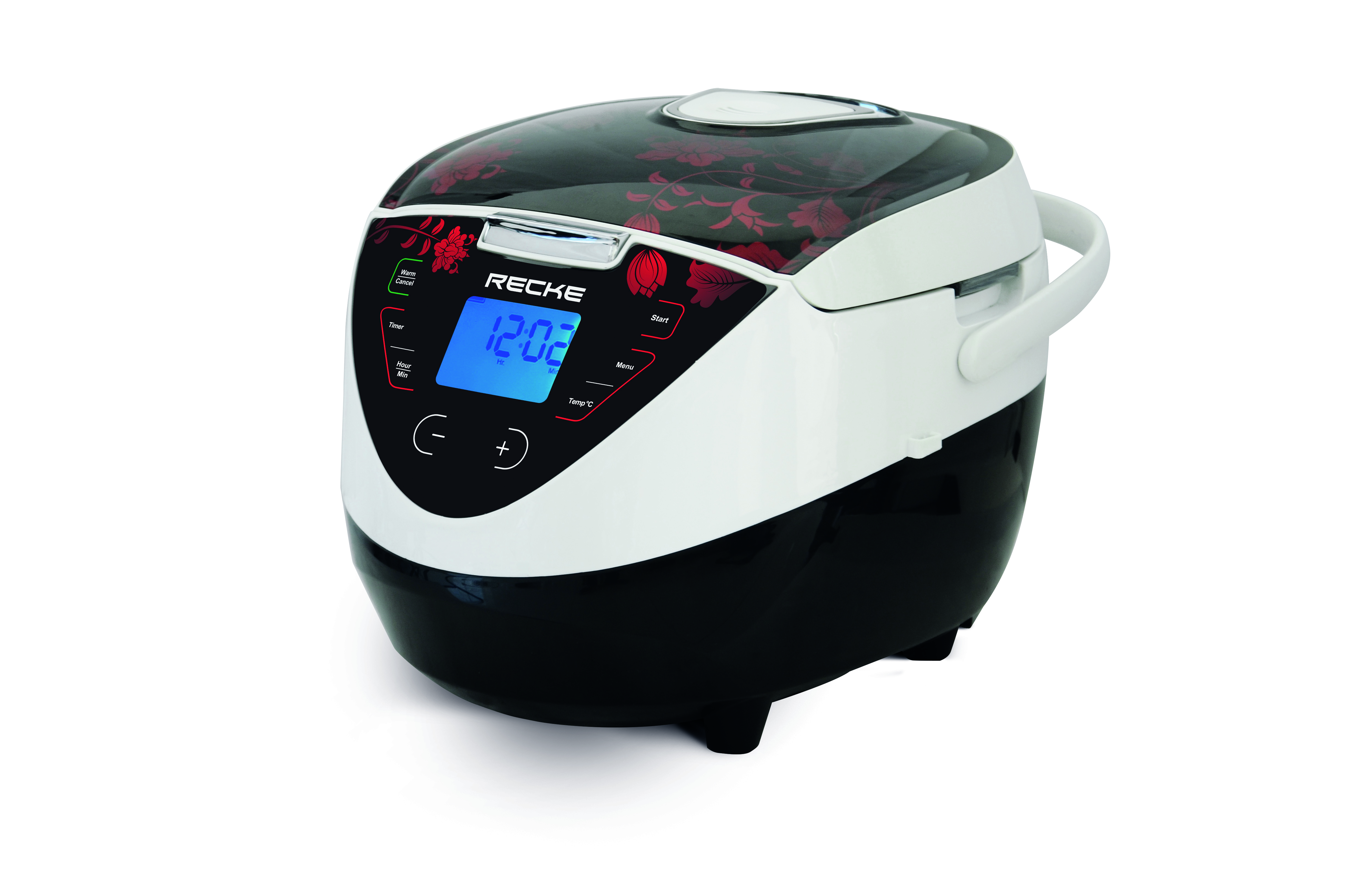
RECKE-brand "MC-150" automatic multicooker

A multicooker (also written "multi cooker") is an electric kitchen appliance for cooking. A basic multicooker has an internal pot set over a heating element at the bottom of a larger base, a dial to set the heat level, and a lid with a handle. A typical multicooker is able to boil, simmer, bake, fry, deep fry, grill roast, stew, steam and brown food.

A multicooker may also include a timer, or automated cooking of specific types of dishes. With automated cookers one can press a button corresponding to a type of dish and leave the multicooker to cook according to the program, typically without any need for further user intervention. Some multicookers have an adjustable thermostat.

In addition to cooking programs, a multicooker may have functions to keep food warm, reheat it or to cook it at a later time. Some multicookers can also function as slow cookers.

Multicookers are often marketed under the name "Hot Pot" or "Electric Hot Pot" because of its ability to make the Hot pot dish Multicookers have similarities to Electric kettles and Rice cookers. It is distinguished from the former by its larger pot shape, higher power ratings, and not turning off automatically when water boils. It is distinguished from rice cookers by being less specialized in rice cooking. Early rice cookers were very similar to modern manual multicookers

== History ==
In the 1920s in the United Kingdom, basic "multicookers" were marketed to consumers as an appliance that would save on gas consumption, to save money on gas bills.

Simple electric rice cookers were developed in Japan in the 1950s. Over time more functions were added to cook other types of grains and soups, and the appliances became known as multicookers.

Some modern cookers include electronic time, temperature and pressure controllers and are marketed as "automated multipurpose cooking appliances". The most modern ones include Bluetooth and WiFi capabilities and cooking procedures in recipe scripts, mainly by choosing the temperature, time and pressure in multiple steps, to execute and share.

At the same time, the European market had been producing kitchen appliances with individual functions, such as electric kettles, pressure cookers, bread makers, toasters, steamers, microwave ovens, and yogurt makers. The multicooker combines the functions of some of these devices.

Multicookers can make hundreds of dishes characteristic of any cuisine, except those which require specific types of cooking unsupported by the appliances, such as flame grilling.

== Automated Functions ==
Typical programs on automated multicooker models include:

- Cook (standard) – comes to a boiling point and maintains it for a predetermined amount of time. Useful for preparing soup, broth, oatmeal with milk, rice, and grains. (90-110 °C)
- Pasta – heats to a boiling point and pauses with notification to the user that ingredients may be added (further automation would exclude human intervention to release ingredients). After that it comes to a boil again and maintains the temperature for a predetermined amount of time. The program can be used for cooking pasta, dumplings, eggs, sausages, and other products which need boiling water. (90-115 °C)
- Stew – brings to the boiling point and then continues at a slightly lower temperature. This program can make steamed vegetables, meat, and seafood. (85-105 °C)
- Fry – this setting can be used to fry meat, poultry, fish, vegetables, and seafood. Fry with an open or closed lid. (140-160 °C)
- Bake – biscuits, casseroles, cake, and pastries (120-180 °C)
- Rice/grain – heats to a boil and maintains the boil until the water is gone (via evaporation or absorption by the ingredients). This setting is used to cook boiled rice, buckwheat, peas, beans, and coarse grains. (100 °C)
- Pilaf – a combination of the rice and bake programs which starts with a full boil and then the temperature is reduced for a time. (90-110 °C then 70-80 °C)
- Steam – steams vegetables, meat, dumplings, and baby food. (100-115 °C)
- Soup – makes soup, broth, and various drinks. (90-110 °C)
- Yogurt/dough – makes homemade yogurt and proofs dough up to 12 hours. (35-60 °C)

A multicooker may also support the following functions:

- Custom – cooking temperature, pressure and time can be set manually (35-180 °C). This may be used for sous-vide cookery.
- Keep warm – can be automatically activated after some of the programs end and can maintain a hot meal for several hours. The temperature is usually 70 °C or higher to prevent harmful bacteria from developing.
- Reheat – warms up a cold meal up to 50-70 °C.
- Scheduled start – controls the start time for cooking (timer). This function is only applicable to programs which do not require user intervention throughout the process and in which ingredients may safely stay at room temperature for the delay.
- Sterilization – may be used to sterilize baby items by steaming, or to help remove dried leftovers from the cooker after cooking has finished. (100-115 °C)

== Parts ==
A multicooker consists of the following parts:

- Housing – typically plastic, stainless steel or a combination of both. The body is mounted or attached to other parts of the machine. With an air gap between it and the inner bowl, this functions as a thermal insulator.
- Inner bowl – in most modern designs, the bowl is removable and has a non-stick coating (teflon, ceramic, etc.). The non-stick coating is important for multicookers to operate properly. Non-stick coating keeps food from burning and sticking to the bottom and walls of the bowl which prevents disruption of heat during higher heat cooking or leads to uneven heating. It is unlike conventional cookware or slow cookers which must be stirred occasionally.
- Lid – this seals the multicooker preventing the contents from splashing or the food from drying out. Some multicookers have a glass lid.
- Heating element – mounted in the housing, it cooks the food. Temperatures can reach 40-180 °C allowing any method of cooking from keeping food warm to baking or frying. The heating element is typically located in the bottom of a multicooker. Some more sophisticated multicookers have smaller heating elements on the sides and in the lid.
- Temperature sensors – usually located in the center of the housing's bottom, touching the pan to ensure accurate readings. The control panel provides information about the temperature of the bowl’s contents. Some multicookers also have temperature sensors on the sides and on top to allow fine control of heating elements in the lid and sides.
- Pressure sensor – this may be installed if the multicooker supports pressure cooking.
- Control panel – part of the housing, this consists of a microprocessor with programs which are displayed showing the process, temperature and programs. It also includes several buttons to control the process.
- Condensate collector – typically a small container or an area around multicooker's bowl to collect condensation appearing on the lid.

== See also ==
- Food processing
- Home automation
- Instant Pot
- List of cooking appliances
- Meal prep
- Pressure cooking
- Rice cooker
- Rotimatic
- Steaming
