= Corelle Brands =

Kitchenware products maker and distributor

Corelle Brands LLC
- Type: Private
- Industry: Kitchenware
- Founded: 1991; 35 years ago
- Headquarters: Downers Grove, IL, USA
- Key people: Ben Gadbois, president and chief executive officer
- Owner: Anchor Hocking
- Number of employees: 3,000 (2013)
- Website: corellebrands.com

Corelle Brands, LLC is an American kitchenware products maker and distributor based in Downers Grove, Illinois.

The business began as the Corning Consumer Products Company, a division of Corning Incorporated. After being spun off in 1998 the company was called World Kitchen from 2000 to 2018, before adopting its current name. The company has been owned by Anchor Hocking since 2024.

== History ==
=== Corning Incorporated ===
The company began as an unincorporated consumer products division of Corning, Inc. in 1915 with the invention of heat-resistant glass bakeware sold under the Pyrex brand. It was incorporated as the Corning Consumer Products Company (CCPC) in the early 1990s as part of a larger reorganization and Corning contributed or licensed to the company substantially all of its assets used in the existing consumer division.

In November 1994, Corning and the CCPC sold its European, Russian, Middle Eastern and African consumer products businesses to Newell. A major competitor at the time, they would serve as the exclusive distributor for a number of the company’s products in those regions. Corning spun-off CCPC in 1998 and sold the division to Borden. It acquired General Housewares and Ekco in 1999.

=== World Kitchen ===
As part of the sale to Borden, the company was required to shed the "Corning" name within three years. The company was named World Kitchen in 2000.

In 2002 the company filed for bankruptcy under Chapter 11 and underwent financial reorganization. Kenneth Wilkes was named president and CEO in August 2017, following a change in control in April to private equity firm Cornell Capital. that was preceded by a long period of organizational changes and operational restructuring.

On February 5, 2018, the company announced it had changed its name to "Corelle Brands" in order to take advantage of one of its most recognizable trademarks. In August, Corelle Brands announced it would be investing $50 million over the next four years to update its Corning plant and expand its workforce.

=== Instant Brands ===
On March 4, 2019, the company announced it had entered into a merger agreement with Instant Brands, maker of the Instant Pot kitchen appliance, and Corelle’s chief executive would become the chief executive of the merged company while Instant Brands founder Robert Wang would become the merged company’s "chief innovative officer". Financial details of the deal were not disclosed.

On June 2, 2020, the company announced Ben Gadbois as the replacement for Kenneth Wilkes, who retired but continued to serve on the board of directors. On January 28, 2021, CEO Ben Gadbois announced Corelle Brands would change its global parent company name to Instant Brands.

In 2023, after filing for Chapter 11 bankruptcy on June 12, Instant Brands sold its appliance business to Centre Lane Partners, a private equity firm. The following year, the company's dinnerware division returned to its name of Corelle Brands and was also purchased by Centre Lane.

=== Anchor Hocking ===
Centre Lane Partners transferred ownership of Corelle to Anchor Hocking, another company they owned. This arrangement came into public awareness in September 2024 after Anchor Hocking announced plans to close Pyrex's 132-year old factory in Charleroi, Pennsylvania, and relocate production to Anchor Hocking's factory in Lancaster, Ohio.

The announcement drew intense backlash in Pennsylvania. Senators Bob Casey Jr. and John Fetterman each criticized the move and demanded an explanation for how the merger of two major competitors was able to proceed without Federal Trade Commission oversight. The State of Pennsylvania filed a lawsuit against Centre Lane Partners that attempted to halt the factory closure, but the case was dismissed by a federal judge. After months of uncertainty and multiple temporary closures, Anchor Hocking permanently closed the Charleroi factory in April 2025.

== Domestic and international markets ==
Corelle Brands products were typically sold in supermarkets in the USA, and by some high-end retailers catering to upper class consumers in parts of Asia, Europe, and South America. In China, its goods enjoy limited distribution and products are sold through TV Home Shopping channels and in shopping malls.

Corelle Brands also had outlet stores Corningware, Corelle and More throughout the United States.

== Brands ==
=== Current ===
Corelle Brands manufactures products under names such as:

- Corelle
- Corningware
- Pyrex
- Visions
- Chicago Cutlery

=== Past ===
On June 1, 2004, WKI Holding Company, Inc., which operates principally through its subsidiary World Kitchen, Inc., announced that it had completed the sale of OXO International to Helen of Troy Limited for over $273 million in cash.

In 2018, Corelle Brands discontinued production of Revere Ware and Bakers Secret.

=== Visions ===
Visions is a transparent cookware line created by Corning France in the late 1970s. In 1983, it was introduced in the US and became the number one selling cookware set for a number of years. Visions is made of a transparent version of Pyroceram glass-ceramic, occasionally referred to as Calexium. However, its lids have typically been made out of Pyrex (both Borosilicate and Soda-lime glass) in the US and Asia. Originally introduced in an amber color, a cranberry tinted version was available from 1992 until 2004. A white variation was available primarily in Europe as "White Vision" and in the US in limited supply under the name "Pyromax". Visions was temporarily unavailable in the United States from 2004 until 2006 but has otherwise been produced non-stop for nearly 40 years.

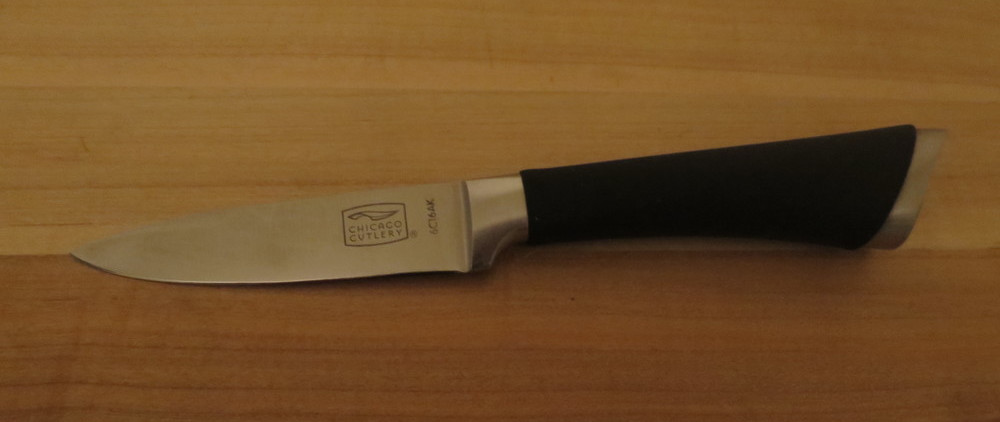
Chicago Cutlery 3.25" Parer, Model: Fusion

=== Chicago Cutlery ===
In 1930 Chicago Cutlery was incorporated by Alfred Paulson. Initially it focused on knife conditioning before making its main business manufacture of kitchen cutlery. Chicago Cutlery was a subsidiary brand of Corelle Brands.

=== CorningWare ===
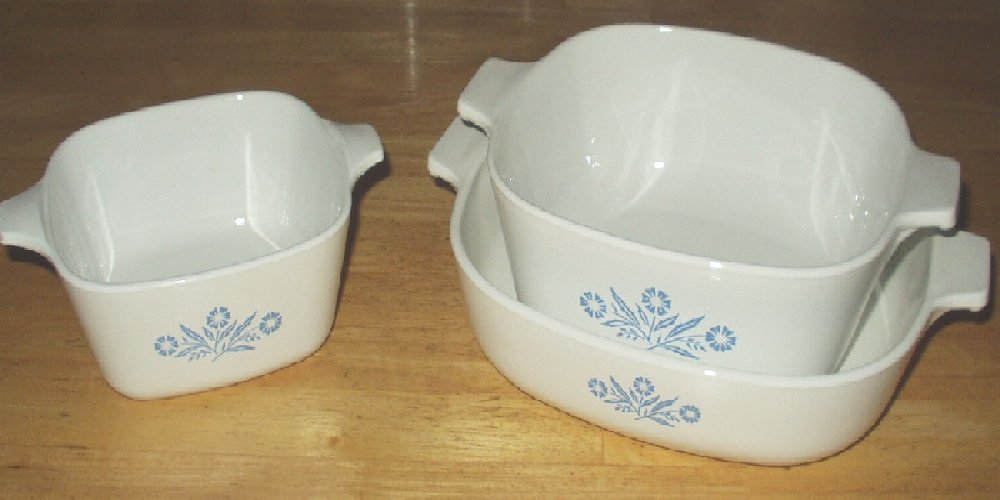
Corning Ware casserole dish and other cookware pieces

Originally introduced in 1958, Corning Ware was made in the US from a glass-ceramic material called Pyroceram which was able to withstand temperatures as high as 850 °C. Due to its high thermal shock resistance, Corning Ware could be used to store food in a freezer and then taken directly to a stove, placed under a broiler or in an oven (both conventional and microwave). Lids have typically been made out of Pyrex (both Borosilicate and Soda-lime glass) though some versions were also created out of Pyroceram. It was discontinued in 2003, replaced by a stoneware line of bakeware made in China under the same name. In December 2008, the company released CorningWare StoveTop. It reintroduced the original Pyroceram product, this time made in France alongside Visions, and made available for purchase through its outlet stores and retail website.

The factory in France, which produces both CorningWare StoveTop and Visions, is one of the few still capable of producing glass-ceramic products.

=== EKCO ===
In 1888, Edward Katzinger founded the Edward Katzinger Company in Chicago to manufacture baking pans. In 1945, the company went public under the new name EKCO Products Company. Throughout its history, the company grew both organically and with acquisitions until it was the largest non-electric housewares manufacturer in the US by the mid-1960s. The company was sold to the conglomerate American Home Products (AHP) in 1965. AHP later split its housewares division into Ekco Products Inc., Ekco Housewares Co., and The Prestige Group Limited; Ekco Housewares was sold to the investment firm Gibbons, Green, Van Amerongen in 1984. The company was sold again to Centronics Corp. in 1987, which then re-branded itself as Ekco Group, Inc. Corning Consumer Products Co. purchased Ekco along with General Housewares Inc. in 1999.

== Product issues ==
Pyrex-branded glass products have been the subject of urban legends and safety concerns. Beginning in the 1980s, production of clear Pyrex glass bakeware was switched from a more thermally resistant borosilicate glass to mechanically stronger soda-lime glass. The concern stems from the fact that soda-lime glass is more susceptible to breaking when exposed to sudden temperature differences. This change received greater attention after Corning, Inc. spun-off the Corning Consumer Products Company. The consumer affairs magazine Consumer Reports investigated the issue, in January 2011, confirming that borosilicate glass bakeware was less susceptible to thermal shock breakage than tempered soda-lime bakeware. However, the organization acknowledged its testing conditions were "contrary to instructions" provided by the manufacturer. Statistical Assessment Service (STATS) analyzed the data available and found that the most common way that users were injured by glassware was via mechanical breakage, being hit or dropped, and that "the change to soda lime represents a greater net safety benefit."
