= Corelle =

Brand of glassware and dishware

Corelle serving bowl, in "Butterfly Gold" pattern introduced at launch in 1970.

Corelle is a brand of glassware and dishware. It is made of Vitrelle, a tempered glass product consisting of two types of glass laminated into three layers. It was introduced by Corning Glass Works in 1970, but is now manufactured and sold by Corelle Brands.

== Material ==
Corelle is best known for its three-layered glass. Nevertheless the Corelle product line includes items of other materials, such as stoneware and plastic.

Vitrelle is the brand name specific to the three-layered glass material. The outer layers are clear glass, while the inner layer is opaque white. For those items with colored decoration, the decoration is a glassy ink applied on the outside of the three-layered item. The resulting tableware is strong and lightweight.

== Patterns ==
Corelle dishware has come in many different patterns over the years since it was introduced, but most of these were retired when Corning divested itself of the Corning Consumer Products Company. Many of the patterns were also used in CorningWare cookware. Retired patterns are still widely available.

== Sizes ==
=== Bowls ===
==== Dipping ====
- 2.4 ounce
- 6 ounce
- 10 ounce
- 11 ounce

==== Soup and cereal ====
- 18 ounce
- 20 ounce
- 28 ounce

==== Meals ====
- 30 ounce
- 46 ounce

==== Serving ====
- 1 quart
- 2 quart
