= Serif (publisher) =

Independent publishing company founded in 1992, based in London

- Parent company: OR Books
- Founded: 1992; 34 years ago
- Founder: Stephen Hayward (1954–2015)
- Country of origin: United Kingdom
- Headquarters location: London
- Distribution: Turnaround Publisher Services (UK); Wakefield Press (Australia); Argosy Books (Ireland); Interlink Publishing (US and Canada); Central Books (International)
- Publication types: Books
- Official website: www.serifbooks.co.uk

Serif is an independent book publishing house founded in London, in 1992 by Stephen Hayward (1954–2015), who had previously been an editor with Lawrence & Wishart.

The company's list covers the subjects of history, politics, travel, culture and fiction, with book jackets — described as "works of art in themselves" — designed by Pentagram Berlin. Alongside original titles, reissues feature prominently in Serif's output, including Evelyn Waugh's 1932 account of his travels in Guiana and Brazil, 92 Days (with an afterword by Pauline Melville), George Dangerfield's The Strange Death of Liberal England, Norman Cohn's Warrant for Genocide, Jorge Semprún's The Cattle Truck, works by J. M. Synge, as well as significant cookery books such as The Alice B. Toklas Cookbook and the Glenfiddich Award-winning titles by Édouard de Pomiane, Cooking in Ten Minutes and Cooking with Pomiane. Among other authors published by Serif are Steve Aylett, Chitrita Banerji, Frances Bissell, Gerald Brenan, E. H. Carr, Nuruddin Farah, Chenjerai Hove, Federico García Lorca and George Rudé. Primarily a publisher of printed books, Serif began producing e-books in 2012.

== Acquisition by OR Books ==
Subsequent to Stephen Hayward's death of a heart attack while on holiday in Almeria, Spain, in October 2015, it was announced in April 2016 that Serif had been acquired by New York-based independent publishing house OR Books, whose co-founder Colin Robinson said: "I knew Serif's founder and publisher, Stephen Hayward, over many years. I always admired his approach to publishing and share his commitment to progressive books. We're delighted to be able to bring the Serif list under OR's wing and aim to develop the imprint in the adventurous, lively spirit with which Stephen ran it."
