= Christmas Gift of the Year =

Award by the Swedish Retail Institute

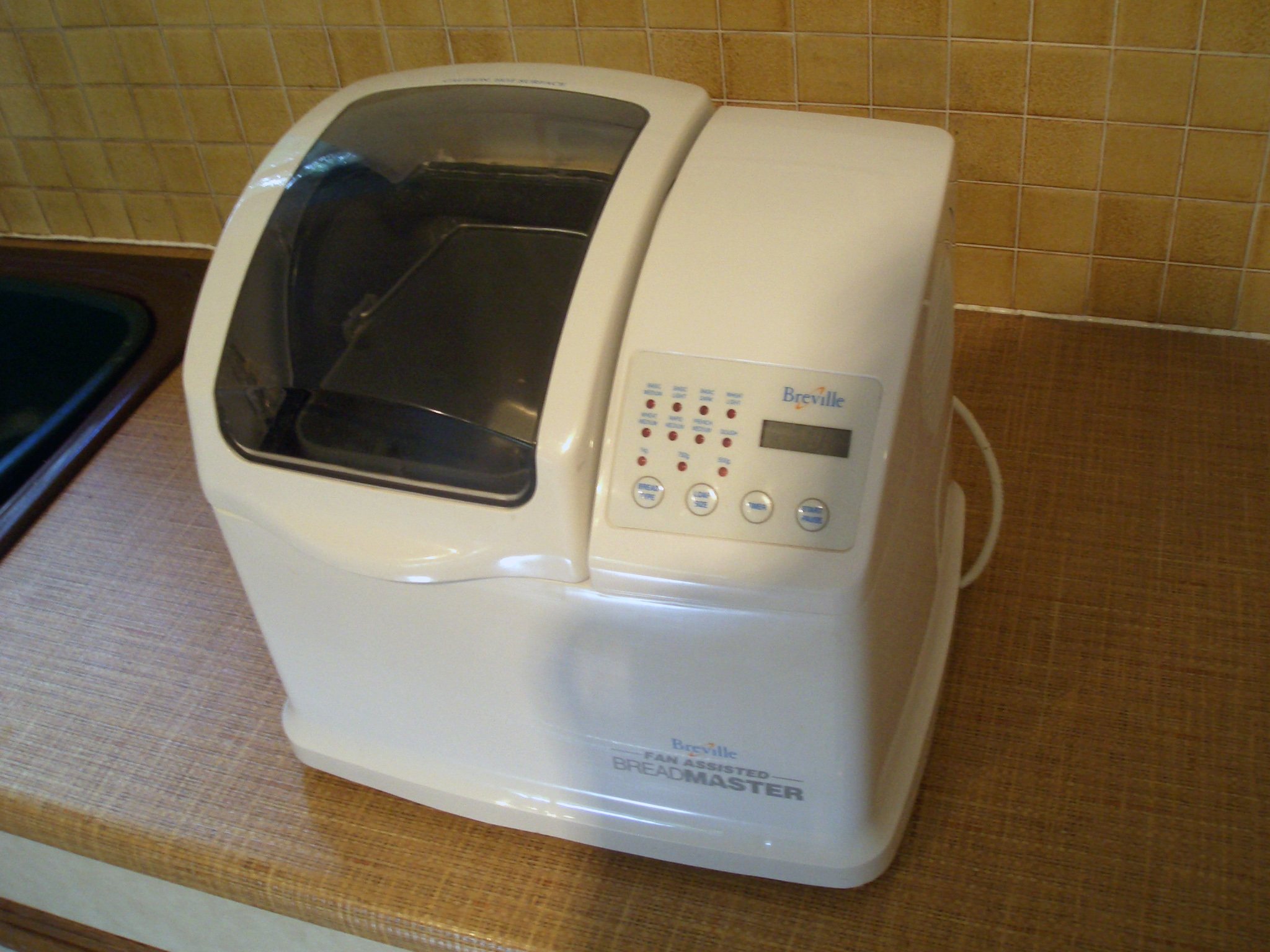
- The bread machine became the 1988 Christmas Gift of the Year.
- Date: 1988-
- Country: Sweden
- Presented by: HUI Research
- Website: https://hui.se/arets-julklapp/

The Christmas Gift of the Year or Christmas Present of the Year (Swedish: Årets julklapp) is a kind of "award" given to a special product each year by the Swedish Retail Institute, in time before Christmas.

== Christmas Gift of the Year throughout the years ==
- 1988 – bread machine
- 1989 – camcorder
- 1990 – wok
- 1991 – CD player
- 1992 – video game
- 1993 – perfume
- 1994 – mobile telephone
- 1995 – Compact Disc
- 1996 – Internet
- 1997 – digital pet, for example Tamagotchi
- 1998 – computer game
- 1999 – books
- 2000 – DVD player
- 2001 – tools
- 2002 – cookbook – declared by reduced value-added tax on books, TV-cooks and a revival in the interest for cooking food
- 2003 – knit cap
- 2004 – flat panel TV set
- 2005 – Poker set
- 2006 – audiobook
- 2007 – GPS navigation device
- 2008 – an experience
- 2009 – bed of nails
- 2010 – tablet computer
- 2011 – packed bag of groceries
- 2012 – headphones
- 2013 – juicer
- 2014 – fitness tracker
- 2015 – robotic vacuum cleaner
- 2016 – virtual reality headset
- 2017 – electric bicycle
- 2018 – recycled garment
- 2019 – A box for mobile telephones
- 2020 – portable stove
- 2021 – event ticket
- 2022 – Home-knitted wear
- 2023 – Board game
- 2024 – Unisex fragrance
- 2025 – Adult toy
