= International Display Works =

International Display Works, Inc.
- Company type: Public
- Traded as: Nasdaq: IDWK
- Industry: Technology
- Founded: December 2, 1925; 100 years ago, in Rocklin, California
- Headquarters: Roseville, California
- Key people: Thomas A. Lacey (CEO & chairman)
- Products: LCD
- Revenue: $78.58 million USD (2005)
- Number of employees: 2,500
- Website: www.idwk.com

International Display Works, Inc. was a manufacturer and designer liquid crystal display LCD products internationally though its factories in the People's Republic of China. Its products were found in the telecommunications, automotive, medical, computing, home appliance, and consumer electronics industries.

== History ==
- September 16, 2005, Oppenheimer research group initiates a buy.
- December 5, 2005, Whirlpool announces it will use IDWK's LCD screens in upcoming washing machines
- April 4, 2006, IDWK receives a 5 million dollar order from an undisclosed client
- September 5, 2006, Flextronics to acquire International DisplayWorks for $300 Million

== Products ==
International Display Works manufactures many different types of nematics (liquid crystals) which are a main component in LCD televisions. These include twisted nematic, high performance twisted nematic, super-twisted nematic, color super-twisted nematic, and film compensated super-twisted nematic LCDs.

LCD screens are used in many products, including calculators, watches, cellular telephones, washing machines, office equipment, hand held computers, automotive equipment, and medical electronics.

== Management ==
IDWK is managed day-to-day by an executive group composed of members from both China and the United States. As customary for a publicly traded company, IDWK is also overseen by a board of directors that votes on important company decisions. The executive chairman and chief executive officer both hold positions on the board of directors.
