= Domestic technology =

Usage of applied science in houses

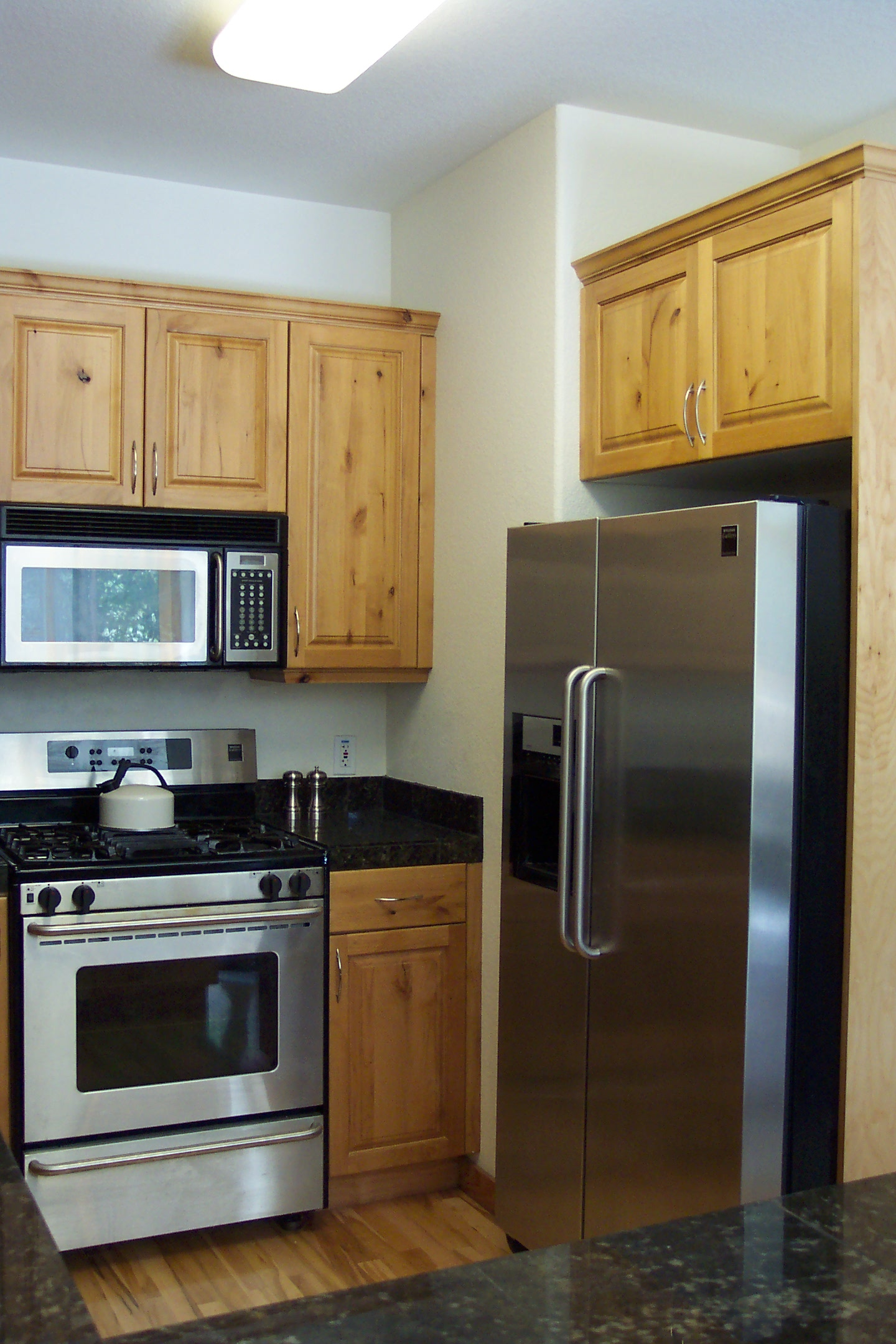
A kitchen with various types of domestic technology, including an oven, a microwave oven and a refrigerator

Domestic technology is the incorporation of applied science into the home. There are multiple aspects of domestic technology. On one level, there are home appliances, home automation and other devices commonly used in the home, such as clothes dryers and washing machines.

On another level, domestic technology recognizes the use of applied science to construct homes to achieve a particular goal, such as energy efficiency or self-sufficiency. For more information, read about self-sufficient homes. It has been claimed that domestic technology has led to decreases in the time people spend on household work, although the factual basis of this claim is disputed.

== Types of domestic technology ==
Many technologies are now routinely used around the home. For example, microwave ovens and washing machines, among others.

=== Cleaning equipment ===
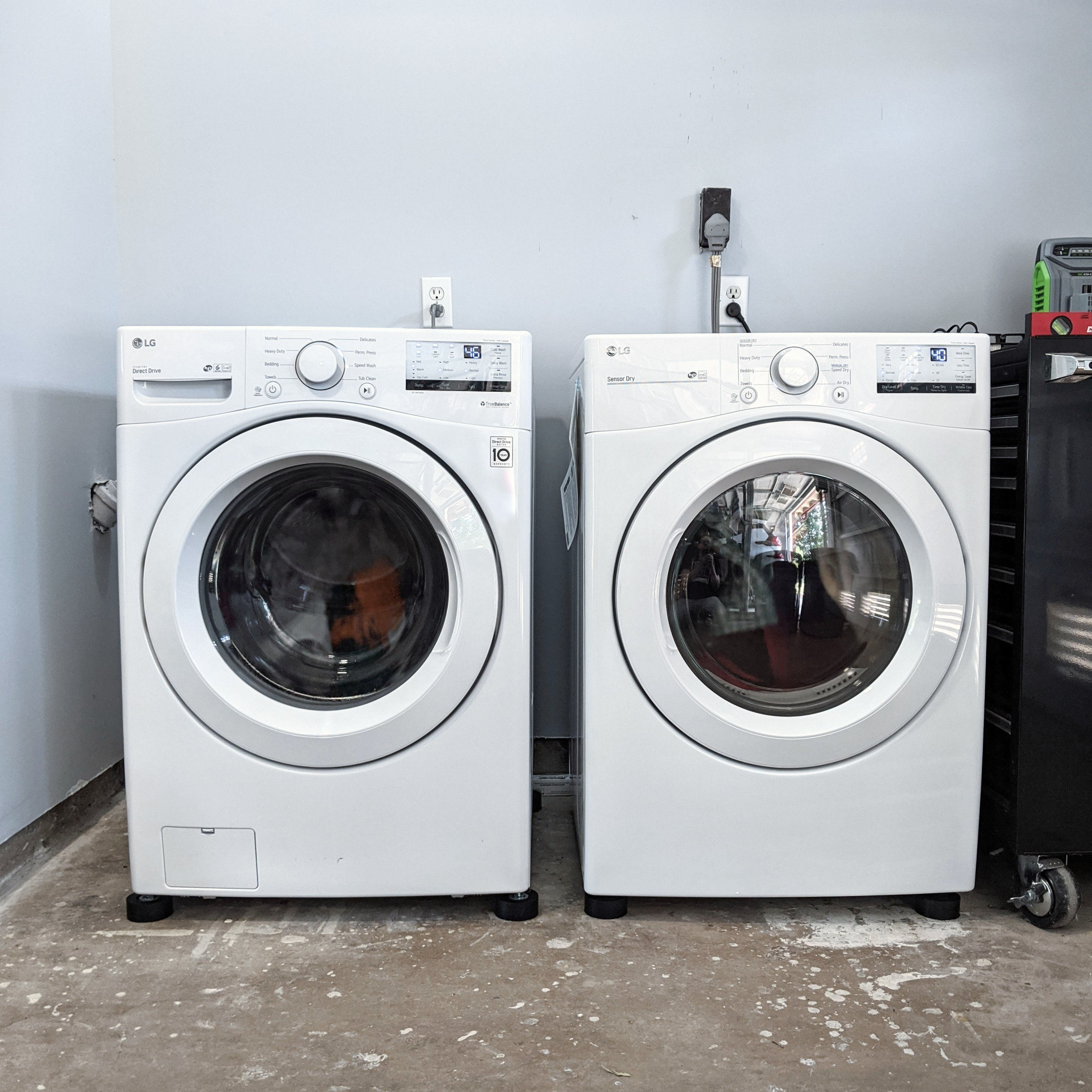
For many, washing machines form an indispensable part of modern household laundry

- Broom
- Mop
- Sink
- Shower
- Bath
- Vacuum cleaner
- Dishwasher
- Washing machine
- Clothes dryer
- Hair dryer

=== Electric lighting ===
- Fluorescent light bulb

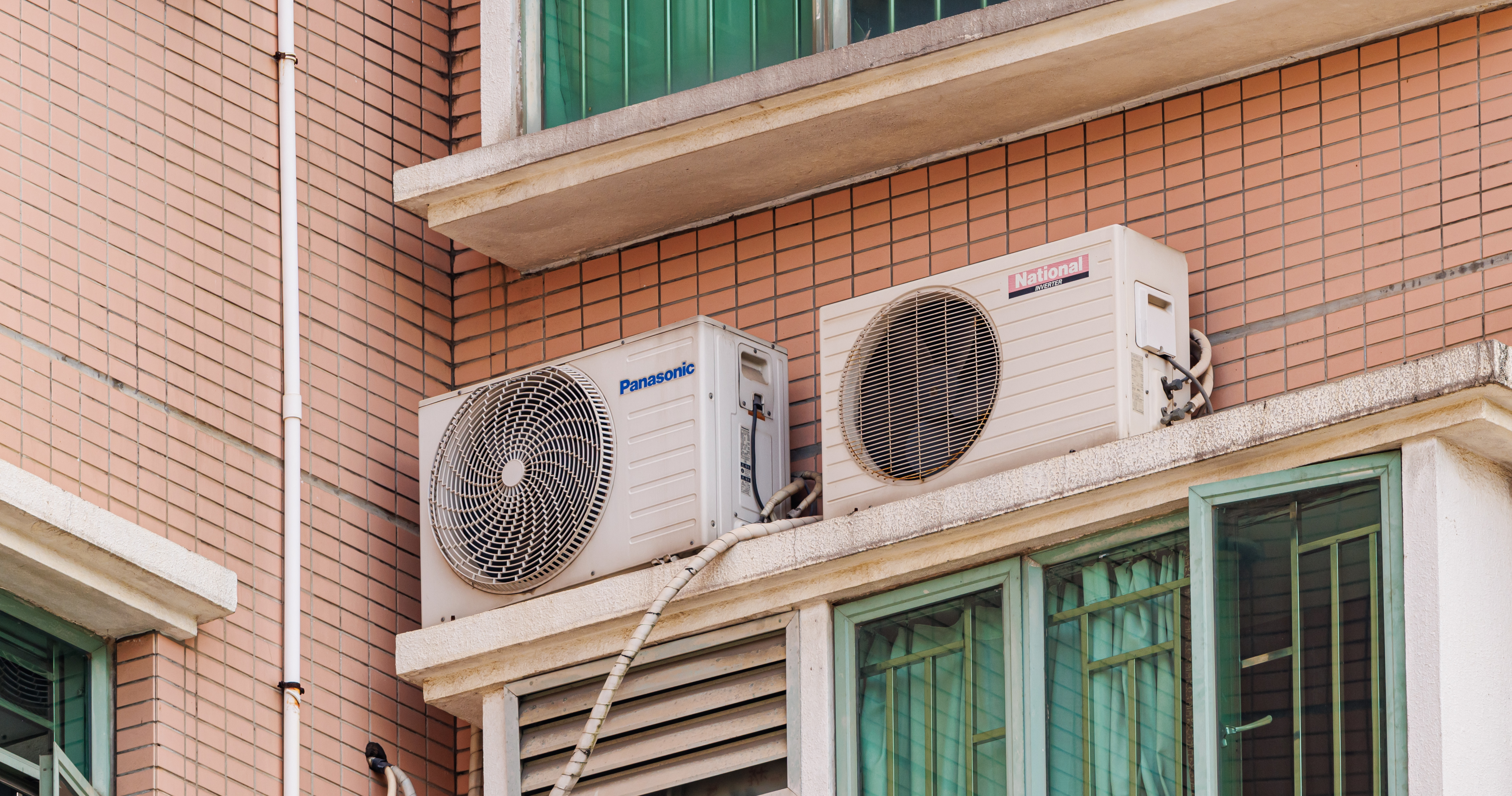
Air Conditioners

- Incandescent light bulb
- LED light bulb

=== Cooking appliances ===
- Barbecue
- Bread maker
- Blender
- Coffee machine
- Faucet
- Food processor
- Microwave oven
- Mixer
- Oven
- Rotimatic

=== Food storage and preservation ===
- Food storage container
- Canning
- Refrigerator

=== Home maintenance ===
- Groundskeeping equipment
- Garden tools
- Paint sprayer

=== Air conditioning ===
- Air conditioner
- Central heating unit
- Fan

=== Computer systems ===
- Data storage device
- Personal computer
- Telephone
- Video game console
- Knitting machine
- Plumbing
- Home router

=== Power generation ===
- Solar panels
- Wind Turbines

=== Home security ===
- Surveillance cameras
- Alarm systems
- Electronic locks

== Home automation ==
In the 21st century, especially by the 2010s, home automation has increasingly been introduced into the modern household, colloquially referred to as smart home technology.

While the technology was already in development in the 1990s, only in the next two decades was local area networking ubiquitous in the home, thanks to the introduction of computer networking.

Since modern home networks often make use of wireless networking (e.g. Wi-Fi), modern automation can easily be set up without having to run wires through the building. Alternatively, they can be connected to wired networks.

=== Types of home automation ===
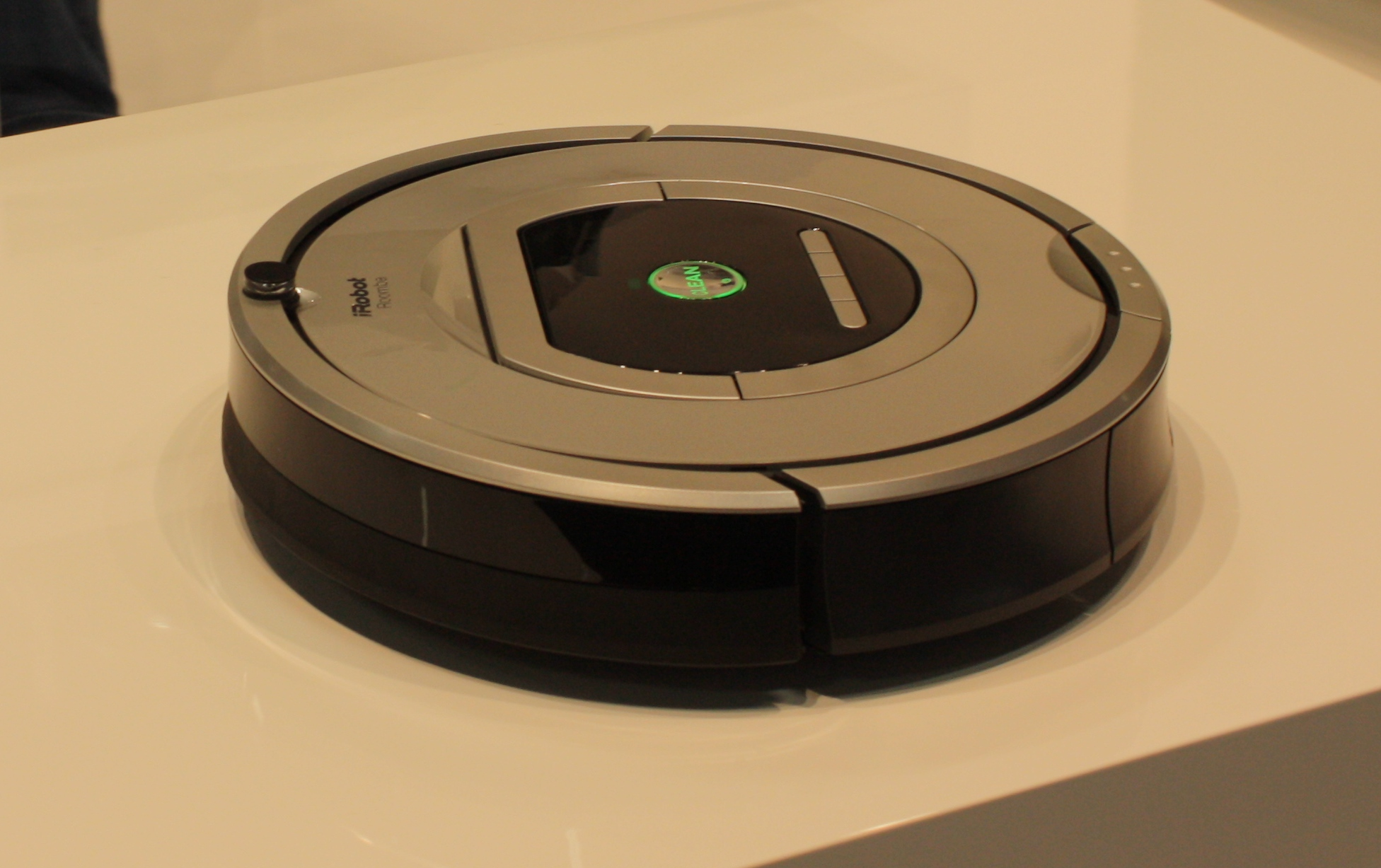
A robotic vacuum cleaner is an example of a domestic robot

- Smart home appliances
- Automatic vacuum cleaners and other Domestic robots
- Smart locks
- Smart speakers, with voice controlled digital personal assistants.

=== Concerns towards home automation ===
Unlike older forms of domestic technology, smart appliances are Internet-facing, and there have been many concerns that cyberattacks may be conducted on insecure home appliances. A kind of attack is to deploy malware on smart home appliances known as botnets, which can be controlled by a remote attacker.

== See also ==
- Air pollution
- Food safety
- Home automation
- Major appliance
- Water quality
