= The Strange Death of Tory England =

2005 book by Geoffrey Wheatcroft

- Author: Geoffrey Wheatcroft
- Language: English
- Genre: Political commentary
- Publisher: Allen Lane, London
- Publication date: 31 Mar 2005
- Publication place: United Kingdom
- Media type: Print (Hardback & Paperback)
- Pages: 336
- ISBN: 978-0-7139-9801-6
- OCLC: 59208118
- Preceded by: The Controversy of Zion (1996)

The Strange Death of Tory England is a book of political commentary by the journalist Geoffrey Wheatcroft, published in 2005.

== Outline ==
In the run-up to the 2005 general election in the United Kingdom, Wheatcroft looks at the journey of the Conservative Party, from being the country's most successful political party of the 20th century to its wilderness of a long period in opposition, by way of Margaret Thatcher's heyday and her fall from power and the quite different style of John Major.

== Summary ==
The book begins with the Conservative leadership contest of 1963, following the resignation of Harold Macmillan, which turned into a fight between his deputy Rab Butler and the Earl of Home, the aristocratic dark horse. Home won, disclaimed his peerage, became Sir Alec Douglas-Home and was elected to the House of Commons at a hastily arranged by-election. A dismayed Iain Macleod, the modernising chairman of the party, refused to serve in Home's Cabinet and alleged that the leadership had been stitched up by a "Magic Circle" of Old Etonians. Wheatcroft depicts this contest as a clash between supporters of "the virtues of an hereditary governing class" and those of "worth proved by ability".

Next comes a history of the party from its 17th-century beginnings, at the time of the Restoration, followed by an account of the Douglas-Home, Harold Wilson and Edward Heath years and Britain's trials and tribulations of the 1970s, which culminated in the election of Margaret Thatcher's first government in 1979.

Within a few years, while holding onto power, the party began to split and fall apart. Wheatcroft seeks to explain this decline by offering factors long discussed by commentators: internal splits over Britain's place in Europe, political sleaze, a fundamental lack of ideology and a growing desire in the country for change after eighteen years of Conservative rule, coinciding with Tony Blair's "brilliant cynical sincerity".

== Future ==
Wheatcroft finally proposes some cures for the party's ills. He considers that Britain lacks a mainstream party of the right that puts the country's own national interest first. He questions the absence of the mavericks the party used to have, giving it more life and soul, noting the example of Enoch Powell's opposition to capital punishment. Also is examined the rise of the American neoconservatives. The author suggests that the British Conservatives could learn both from them and from the Lion and Unicorn conservatism of the socialist George Orwell. He concludes:

Conservatives have sat around for some years saying to themselves that they will get back one day, but there is no necessary reason why this should be so. No law of history says that any political party has to survive. In 1906, the Liberals won the greatest of landslide elections and within ten years they had lost office as a party, never to hold power again. Whether the Tories are destined to follow them may depend on humility and capacity to learn from error.

== Title ==
The book appears to draw its title from George Dangerfield's The Strange Death of Liberal England (1935) which sought to explain the decline of the British Liberal Party after 1910. The "Strange Death of Tory England" phrasing had previously been used as a title by Anne Applebaum for an article published the day after the 2001 general election; the article, much like Wheatcroft's book that would follow it four years later, aimed to analyse the Conservative Party's political fortunes (though primarily in the context of the aforementioned 2001 election), with Applebaum attributing much of the party's poor performance to changes within both internal party culture (namely, Thatcherism's promotion of meritocracy and entrepreneurship being at odds with traditional Conservative support for non-meritocratic institutions such as the monarchy, and the party's image as the natural party of rural England being eroded by the fielding of self-made and/or urban candidates in rural constituencies instead of the usual "country gents") and broader national culture (which Applebaum claimed had become more interested in modern mass culture, particularly if American in origin, than traditional English culture and history), as well as their Labour opponents "stealing the Conservatives' best ideas and then successfully characterizing them as far-right lunatics".

== Cover ==
The book's front cover shows John Major, then the last Conservative prime minister, batting in a game of cricket, at the moment of being clean bowled (his wicket demolished). That alludes to Major's well-known love of cricket and to the result of the United Kingdom general election of 1997, which was won in a landslide by the Labour Party with 418 seats in the House of Commons, its highest ever total, while the Conservatives took only 165, their worst performance since the general election of 1906. In 1997, the Conservatives did not win a single seat in Scotland or in Wales. Little changed at the 2001 General Election, with Labour taking 413 seats, the Conservatives 166, the Liberal Democrats 52 and the others 28.

== Reviews ==
The historian Sir Raymond Carr, writing in The Spectator, said:

Journalists of Wheatcroft’s talents make excellent contemporary historians... He has that rarest of gifts, that of compressing complex issues into a few sharp sentences... stunning.
