= Convenience cooking =

Practice of streamlining recipes for simplicity and speed

Convenience cooking is the practice of streamlining recipes for simplicity and speed of preparation. It is a common practice in Western cultures, where both men and women work outside the home and elaborate meals are difficult if not impossible to prepare given the time constraints. Though seemingly a recent phenomenon, guides to convenience cooking go as far back as 1930 French Cooking in Ten Minutes by Edouard de Pomiane, which tried to minimize the time put into much French cooking of the day.

Current well-known practitioners of the art include Rachael Ray and Sandra Lee; in addition, Cook's Illustrated magazine has often incorporated convenience-cooking principles into their recipes.

== Ingredient simplification ==
A significant amount of convenience cooking revolves around simplifying recipes to five or fewer ingredients. There is a substantial genre of cookbooks devoted to such dishes, often, though not always using other prepared foods as ingredients. In this division, "ingredients" generally does not include such things as spices and water.

== Time economy ==
Another important skill in convenience cooking is time management. This genre of cooking focuses largely on process and technique rather than ingredients, and is aimed at getting the best quality out of a quickly prepared meal as possible, especially using common kitchen tools rather than specialized equipment such as convection ovens and microwave ovens. Some recipes remove certain steps that take large amounts of time. Sometimes kneading dough is removed from the process of making bread because it requires large amounts of time and effort. There are machines like Rotimatic available in market which makes Rotis, Puris, etc from the flour in just few minutes.

A common adjunct to this school of food preparation is the slow cooker, which allows unattended preparation of braises, soups, and stews.

== See also ==
- Convenience food
- Multicooker
- Slow cooker
- Rotimatic
