= Geoffrey Wheatcroft =

British journalist and writer (born 1945)

- Born: Geoffrey Albert Wheatcroft; 23 December 1945 (age 80); London, England
- Education: University College School; New College, Oxford University
- Occupations: Journalist, author and historian
- Spouse: Sally Muir (m. 1990)
- Children: 2
- Parent(s): Stephen Frederick Wheatcroft and Joyce (née Reed)
- Awards: National Jewish Book Award

Geoffrey Albert Wheatcroft (born 23 December 1945) is a British journalist, author, and historian.

== Early life and education ==
Geoffrey Wheatcroft is the son of Stephen Frederick Wheatcroft (1921–2016), OBE, and his first wife, Joyce (née Reed). He was born in London and raised in Hampstead. His father was an economist, serving as a governor of the London School of Economics, and an expert on civil aviation, serving as Commercial Planning manager for British Airways from 1946 to 1953, before working for various airlines as an independent consultant.

Wheatcroft was educated at University College School, London, then New College, Oxford, where he studied modern history.

== Publishing and journalism ==
Wheatcroft started work in publishing in 1968, working for Hamish Hamilton (1968–70), Michael Joseph (1971–1973), and Cassell & Co (1974–1975). In 1975, he became the assistant editor of The Spectator, moving to the post of literary editor, which he occupied from 1977 to 1981. During the 1981–1984 period, he worked as a reporter in South Africa before becoming editor of the Londoner's Diary gossip column in the London Evening Standard in 1985–1986. He was a Sunday Telegraph columnist in 1987–1991 and freelance 1993–1996, feature writer on the Daily Express, 1996–1997, and has since written for The Guardian, The Times Literary Supplement, The New York Review of Books, The New Republic, the Boston Globe, The Atlantic, The American Conservative, and other publications on both sides of the Atlantic.

His book The Controversy of Zion won a 1996 National Jewish Book Award. His 2021 biography of Winston Churchill was described by conservative historian Andrew Roberts in The Spectator as a "character assassination"; in The New York Times, Peter Baker wrote: "They are, of course, taking different views of the same man. Roberts's book was described in these pages as the best single-volume biography of Churchill yet written. Wheatcroft's could be the best single-volume indictment of Churchill yet written."

== Marriage and family ==
In 1990, Wheatcroft married the fashion designer and painter Sally Muir, the daughter of Frank Muir. They live in Combe Down, Bath, Somerset, and have two children.

== Books ==
- The Randlords (1985)
- Absent Friends (1989)
- The Controversy of Zion (1996)
- The Strange Death of Tory England (2005)
- Le Tour: A History of the Tour de France (2003, 2007, 2013)
- Yo, Blair! (2007)
- The Life and Afterlife of Winston Churchill (2021)

== Sources ==
- Who's Who (2008 edition) s.v. Geoffrey Wheatcroft
