= The Strange Death of Liberal England =

1935 book by George Dangerfield

- Title page for The Strange Death of Liberal England (1935)
- Author: George Dangerfield
- Language: English
- Genre: Non-fiction
- Publication date: 1935
- Publication place: United Kingdom

The Strange Death of Liberal England is a book written by George Dangerfield and published in 1935. Its thesis is that the Liberal Party in the United Kingdom ruined itself in dealing with the House of Lords, women's suffrage, the Irish question, and trade unions, during the period 1906–1914.

In recent decades most scholars have rejected the main interpretations of events presented in the book. However, the "book has been extraordinarily influential. Scarcely any important analyst of modern Britain has failed to cite it and to make use of the understanding which Dangerfield provides."

In 1999 the book was named by the U.S. publisher Modern Library as one of the "100 Best Nonfiction Books" published in the 20th century.

== Summary ==
=== Thesis ===
Dangerfield argues that four great rebellions before the Great War effectively destroyed the Liberal Party as a party of government. These rebellions were:

- the Conservative Party's fight against the Parliament Act 1911;
- the threat of civil war in Ireland by the Ulster Unionists under Sir Edward Carson with the encouragement of the leader of the Conservative Party, Bonar Law;
- the suffragette movement led by the Pankhursts;
- the increasingly militant trade unions under the influence of syndicalism.

=== On the suffragettes ===
Dangerfield wrote of the suffragettes that "what they did had to be done", but he offered a highly gendered and dismissive analysis, accusing them of "asserting their masculinity", "disorder, arrogance, and outrage", and "pre-war lesbianism". They were "odious to men" and women too, "melodramatic" and "hysterical". He described Emmeline Pankhurst as a "fragile little woman, not more distinguished in her appearance than other pretty little women who have worn well". Suffragette actions were portrayed as "the swish of long skirts, the violent assault of feathered hats, the impenetrable, advancing phalanx of corseted bosoms".

== Publishing history ==
The New York book publishers Harrison Smith and Robert Haas first published the book, but it soon went out of print due to the publisher's bankruptcy. An abridged version was published in Britain in 1936 by Constable. Because the book was viewed as "popular history" and covered a relatively recent period it largely escaped being reviewed in major historical journals.

Capricorn Books, an American publisher, put out a paperback in 1961 that stayed in print for most of the 1960s. This edition added "1910–1914" to the original title. In 1997 it was republished by Serif and Stanford University Press, with a foreword by Peter Stansky.

== Influence and evaluation ==
Kenneth O. Morgan in The Age of Lloyd George: The Liberal Party and British Politics, 1890–1929 (1971) called it "brilliantly written but basically misleading", and stated that its influence on later writers was "totally disproportionate".

Carolyn W. White has argued that

after languishing for three decades, [it] became the single most controversial book on prewar England, the linchpin of a major and continuing historiographical debate. All efforts by professional historians to vanquish what Peter Clarke has described as a "brilliant impressionistic book" have failed. Indeed there is scarcely a book or article on the prewar period that does not mention Dangerfield's book, or attempt to sustain or refute its findings- "a sure sign of its importance," notes John Grigg.

The British studies journal Albion focused on the book and its author in Winter 1985 (Vol. 17, No. 4).

In 1998 the book was chosen as number eighty-two in the Modern Library's list of the 100 Best Nonfiction Books published in the 20th century.

Chris Cook, in A Short History of the Liberal Party 1900–1997 (1998), concluded that the book "can be safely left alone. It is a highly impressionistic account and at times highly misleading".

From the left, Eric Hobsbawm asserted that it was "wrong on most details, but still the most exciting way to start looking at the nation's history during this period".

The book does not take a Marxist perspective, but Paul Foot wrote in the Socialist Review in 1987 that anyone who had not read it "should instantly treat themselves". He argued that "Even after 61 years ... George Dangerfield’s book is supreme. Every page, indeed every sentence, is lifted above the average by his irresistible writing style. The hallmark of this style is that most dangerous of all the weapons in the challenger’s armoury: mockery. The whole book is a mockery of the pretensions of the rulers of the time, most notably the mandarins of Asquith’s Liberal government".

From the right, in a speech to the London Academy of Excellence, the Conservative Cabinet minister Michael Gove mentioned it as one of his favourite history books.

Peter Stansky in 1985 evaluated the book after 50 years:

The Strange Death continues as a major influence on how the period is viewed, and scholars and teachers spend considerable energy in coming to terms with the picture of England, in all its richness and complexity, presented in the book. Historians of the greatest distinction, acknowledging its qualities, have taken great pains to point out the errors of the work. Of course, nothing could more vividly attest to its vitality. And the interpretation will not die; no matter how often it may be knocked on the head, it has shaped the way the period is viewed. With its extraordinary literate and witty prose, its power of description and analysis, even if not presented in a traditional scholarly way, it is a study that will always have to be taken into account. There can be few works that are so vital after fifty years, as likely to survive for another fifty or as enjoyable to read.

The book has inspired the titles of other publications, notably works of contemporary political history. As recently as May 2017 Douglas Murray named his work on European migrant crisis and Islam in Europe, The Strange Death of Europe. Books have also been published in the 2000s with the titles, The Strange Death of Republican America, The Strange Death of Tory England, The Strange Death of Liberal America, The Strange Demise of British Canada, The Strange Death of Marxism, The Strange Death of Labour Scotland and even The Strange Non-Death of Neo-Liberalism. An article in The Economist in 2010 proclaimed "The strange death of social-democratic Sweden".
