= Stephen Wheatcroft (economist) =

British economist (1921–2016)

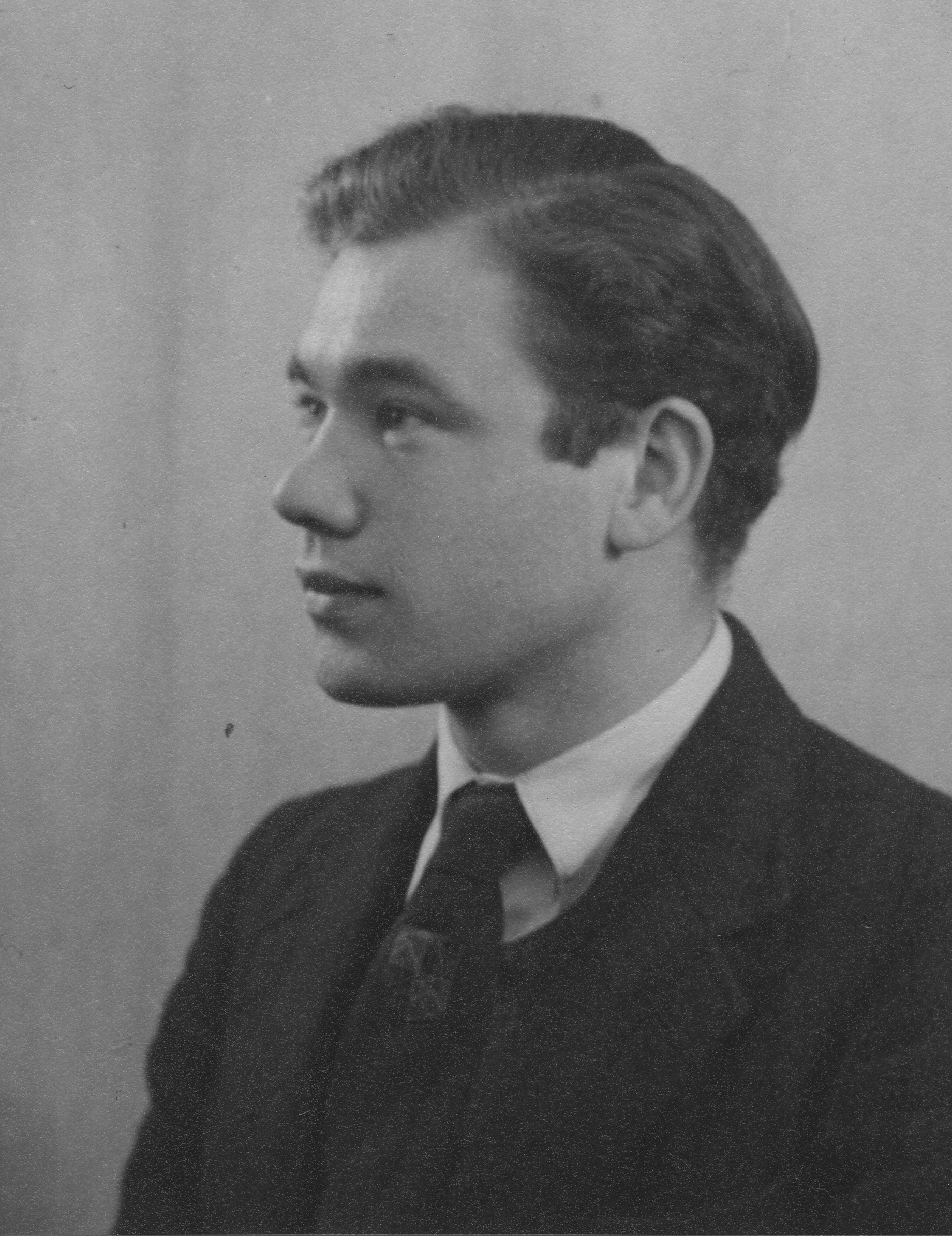
Stephen Frederick Wheatcroft as President of the Student Union at the London School of Economics, 1940

Stephen Frederick Wheatcroft OBE (11 September 1921 – 26 April 2016) was a British economist and civil aviation expert, who played a significant role in the post-World War II development of the civil aviation industry and in the foundation of British Airways.

== Early life and education ==
Wheatcroft was born in north London, the son of carpenter Percy Wheatcroft and Fanny (née Stephens). His only sibling, a brother, was killed whilst serving in the RAF. From The Latymer School in Edmonton, Wheatcroft went as a then rarely-encountered “poor scholarship boy” to the London School of Economics, where he took a first-class degree in Economics.

== Career ==
Wheatcroft was commissioned into the Royal Navy Volunteer Reserve in 1943, and trained in Canada as a Fleet Air Arm pilot. He served aboard HMS Indomitable in the British Pacific Fleet, participating in the bombing of Japanese oil fields in Sumatra. Having returned for a short time to the LSE after demobilisation, Wheatcroft was recruited by British European Airways, serving as Commercial Planning manager from 1946 to 1953, gaining "an encyclopaedic knowledge of the industry". He then spent two years at Manchester University as a Simon Research Fellow, publishing The Economics of European Air Transport in 1956; the book was regarded as "(catching) the zeitgeist" in "(foreseeing) the coming age of cheap air travel that would revolutionise tourism".

From 1956 to 1972 he was an independent consultant employed by various airlines, including in Canada (at one stage consulted by the Canadian politician George Hees to conduct a study of the desirability of competition in the Canadian airline industry, looking at the efficiency of Trans-Canada Air Lines, the effect of competition in the United States, and other factors), India and the West Indies, whilst still being employed as an adviser to British European Airlines. In 1967, he was appointed assessor/ technical adviser to Sir Ronald Edwards's official committee of inquiry into the civil air transport industry; the result was a 1971 Act of Parliament leading to the amalgamation of BEA and the British Overseas Airways Corporation, forming British Airways in 1974. Wheatcroft and Edwards had been appointed members of the board of British Airways in 1972. He remained a board member and chairman of British Airways Helicopters until 1982 when, growing tired of executive corporate life, he returned to independent consultancy, operating Aviation and Tourism International with colleague Geoffrey Lipman from 1983 to 2000.

In 1974, Wheatcroft was appointed OBE. He served as a governor-later the institution's first emeritus governor-of the LSE from 1973 to 2003, and was, as a Fellow, appointed President of the Chartered Institute of Transport from 1978 to 1979.

== Personal life ==
Wheatcroft married firstly, in 1943, Joyce Reed, whom he met whilst at the LSE; they had three children, including the journalist and writer Geoffrey Wheatcroft. His first wife having died in 1974, Wheatcroft later married Alison Dessau, an American living in London. They had two sons. The family lived in Hampshire and at Villeneuve-sur-Lot, in Nouvelle-Aquitaine, France. Wheatcroft was “affable and stylish”, and enjoyed skiing until his seventies.
