= Gerry Hassan =

Scottish writer, commentator and academic (born 1964)

- Born: 1964 (age 61–62); Dundee, Scotland
- Occupations: writer, academic and research fellow
- Writing career
- Language: English
- Website: gerryhassan.com

Gerry Hassan (born 1964) is a Scottish writer, commentator and academic. He was Professor at Glasgow Caledonian University for Social Change, having previously worked at the University of Dundee and the University of the West of Scotland, where he completed his doctorate. He has also previously worked for the Institute for Public Policy Research and Demos where he led their Scotland 2020 and Glasgow 2020 programmes and OpenDemocracy. He has written for the Scottish and UK press, including The Spectator, The Scotsman, The Herald, Holyrood, Sunday Mail, The Guardian and The National (Scotland) on topics and issues related to the United Kingdom, particularly Scotland and Scottish independence.

He currently lives in Kirkcudbright in Dumfries and Galloway where he co-founded and co-programmes the Kirkcudbright Fringe Festival which was founded in 2023. It mixes a wide array of cultural forms: from live music, theatre, performance and visual arts, to books, talks and walks.

== Books/Publications ==
- The New Scotland, 1998 (Fabian Society)
- A Guide to the Scottish Parliament: The Shape of Things To Come, 1999 (The Stationery Office)
- A Different Future: A Moderniser’s Guide to Scotland, 1999 (The Big Issue in Scotland/Centre for Scottish Public Policy)
- The New Scottish Politics: The First Year of the Scottish Parliament and Beyond, 2000 (The Stationery Office)
- The Almanac of Scottish Politics, 2001 (Politico's Publishing)
- Tomorrow’s Scotland, 2002 (Lawrence and Wishart)
- Anatomy of the New Scotland: Power, Influence and Change, 2002 (Mainstream Publishing)
- Staying Human: Respect, Values and Social Justice, 2003 (Scottish Human Services)
- The Scottish Labour Party: History, Institutions and Ideas, 2004 (Edinburgh University Press)
- The Political Guide to Modern Scotland: People, Places and Power, 2004 (Politico's Publishing)
- Scotland 2020: Hopeful Stories for a Northern Nation, 2005 (Demos)
- After Blair: Politics After the New Labour Decade, 2006 (Lawrence and Wishart)
- The Dreaming City: Glasgow 2020 and the Power of Mass Imagination, 2007 (Demos)
- The Modern SNP: From Protest to Power, 2009 (Edinburgh University Press)
- Radical Scotland: Arguments for Self-Determination, 2011 (Luath Press)
- ImagiNation: Stories of Scotland’s Future, 2011 (Big Sky Press)
- The Strange Death of Labour Scotland, 2012 (Edinburgh University Press)
- The Seven Wonders of Scotland, 2012 (Birlinn)
- After Independence: The State of the Scottish Nation Debate, 2013 (Luath Press)
- Caledonian Dreaming: The Quest for a Different Scotland, 2014 (Luath Press)
- Independence of the Scottish Mind: Elite Narratives, Public Spaces and the Making of a Modern Nation, 2014 (Palgrave Macmillan)
- Scotland's Referendum and the Media: National and International Perspectives, 2016 (Edinburgh University Press)
- Scottish National Party Leaders, 2016 (Biteback Publishing)
- Scotland the Bold: How Our Nation Changed and Why There is No Going Back, 2016 (Freight Publishing)
- Scotland, the UK and Brexit: A Guide to the Future, 2017 (Luath Press)
- A Nation Changed?: The SNP and Scotland Ten Years On, 2017 (Luath Press)
- The People's Flag and the Union Jack: An Alternative History of Britain and the Labour Party, 2019 (Biteback Publishing)
- Scotland the Brave? Twenty Years of Change and the Future of the Nation, 2019 (Luath Press)
- The Story of the Scottish Parliament: The First Two Decades Explained, 2019 (Edinburgh University Press)
- Scotland after the Virus, 2020 (Luath Press)
- A Better Nation: The Challenges of Scottish Independence, 2022 (Luath Press)
- Scotland Rising: The Case for Independence, 2022 (Pluto Press)
- Britain Needs Change: The Politics of Hope and Labour's Challenge, 2024 (Biteback Publishing)

== See also ==
- 2014 Scottish independence referendum
