= Bread machine =

Type of home appliance for baking bread

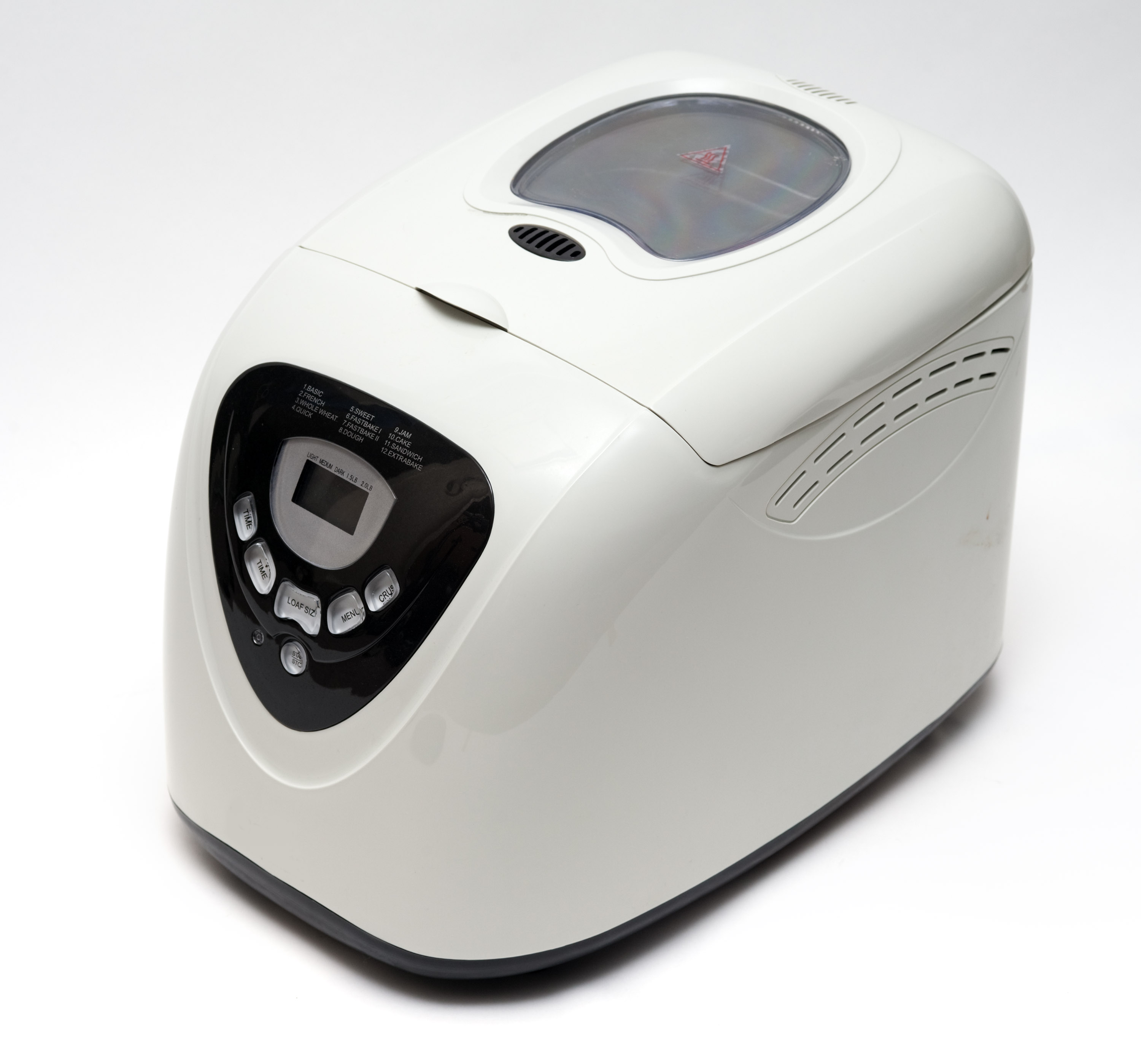
A bread machine, or breadmaker

A bread making machine or breadmaker or bread maker is a home appliance for baking bread. It consists of a bread pan (or "tin"), at the bottom of which are one or more built-in paddles, mounted in the center of a small special-purpose oven. The machine is usually controlled by a built-in computer using settings input via a control panel. Most bread machines have different cycles for different kinds of dough—including white bread, whole grain, European-style (sometimes labelled "French"), and dough-only (for hamburger buns and shaped loaves to be baked in a conventional oven). Many also have a timer to allow the bread machine to function without operator input, and some high-end models allow the user to program a custom cycle.

== History ==
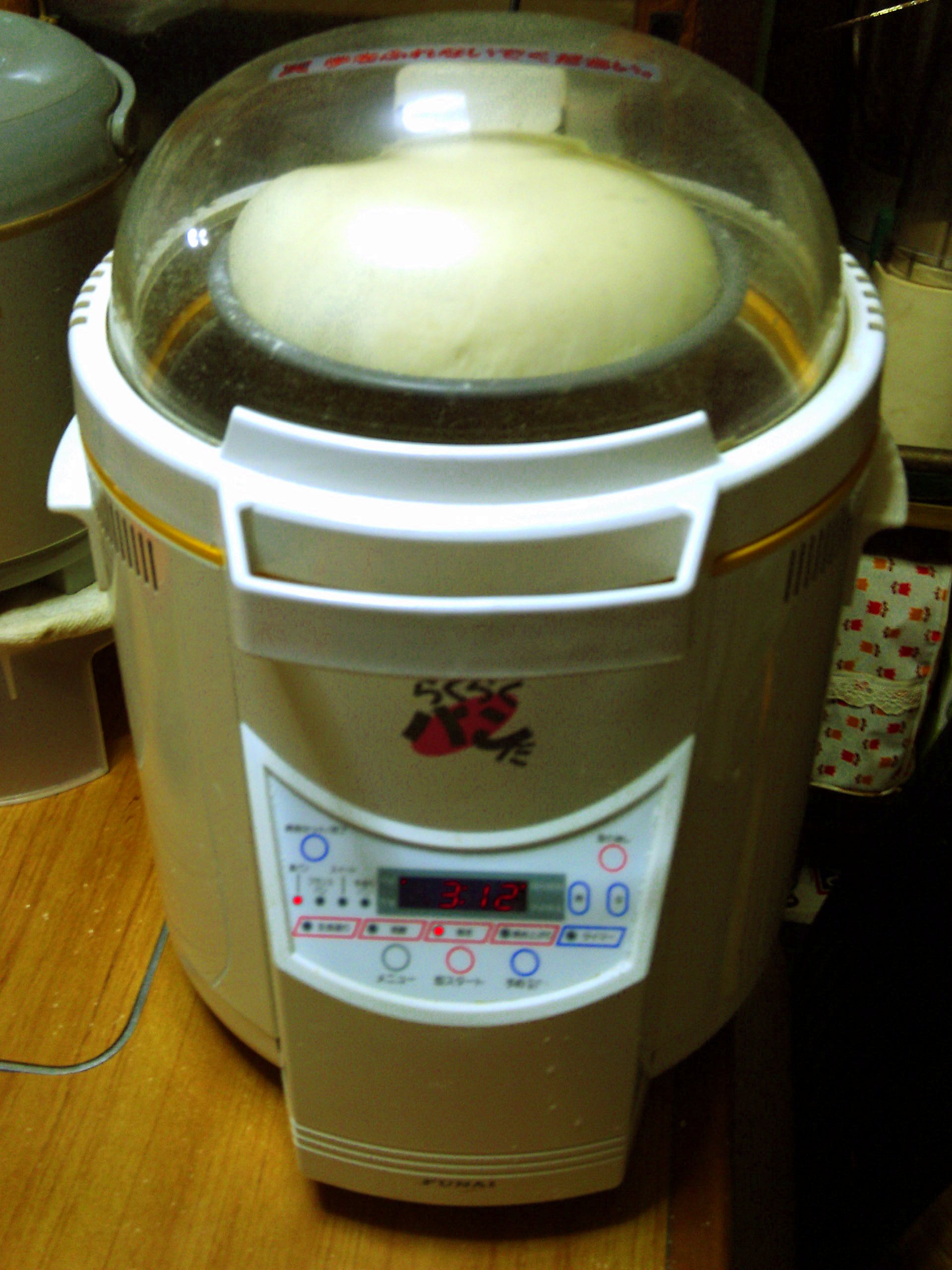
Raku Raku Pan Da the "World's first automatic bread-making machine"

Although bread machines for mass production had been previously made for industrial use, the first self-contained breadmaker for household use was released in Japan in 1986 by the Matsushita Electric Industrial Co. (now Panasonic) based on research by project engineers and software developer Ikuko Tanaka, who trained with the head baker at Osaka International Hotel to learn how to optimally knead bread; this machine had special ribs inside it.

A decade later the machines had become popular in the United Kingdom, Australia and the United States. While not viable for commercial use due to the fixed loaf shape and the limited duty cycle, bread machines are suitable for home use, producing their best results when dealing with kneaded doughs.

== Use and features ==
To create a loaf of bread, ingredients are measured into the bread pan in a specified order (usually liquids first, with solid ingredients layered on top) and the pan is then placed in the breadmaker. The order of ingredients is important because the instant yeast used in bread machines is activated by contact with water, so the yeast and the water must be kept apart until the program starts.

The machine takes a few hours to make a loaf of bread. The ingredients are first rested and brought up to optimal temperature. The ingredients are then turned into a dough by stirring with a paddle. The dough is then proofed using temperature control and then baked.

Once the bread has been baked, the pan is removed from the breadmaker. The shape of the finished loaf is often considered unusual, with many early bread machines producing a vertically oriented, square or cylindrical loaf very different from commercial breads; however, more recent units generally have a more traditional-appearing horizontal pan. Some bread machines use the standard rectangle shape using two paddles. One Zojirushi model has a heating element in the lid to brown the crust.

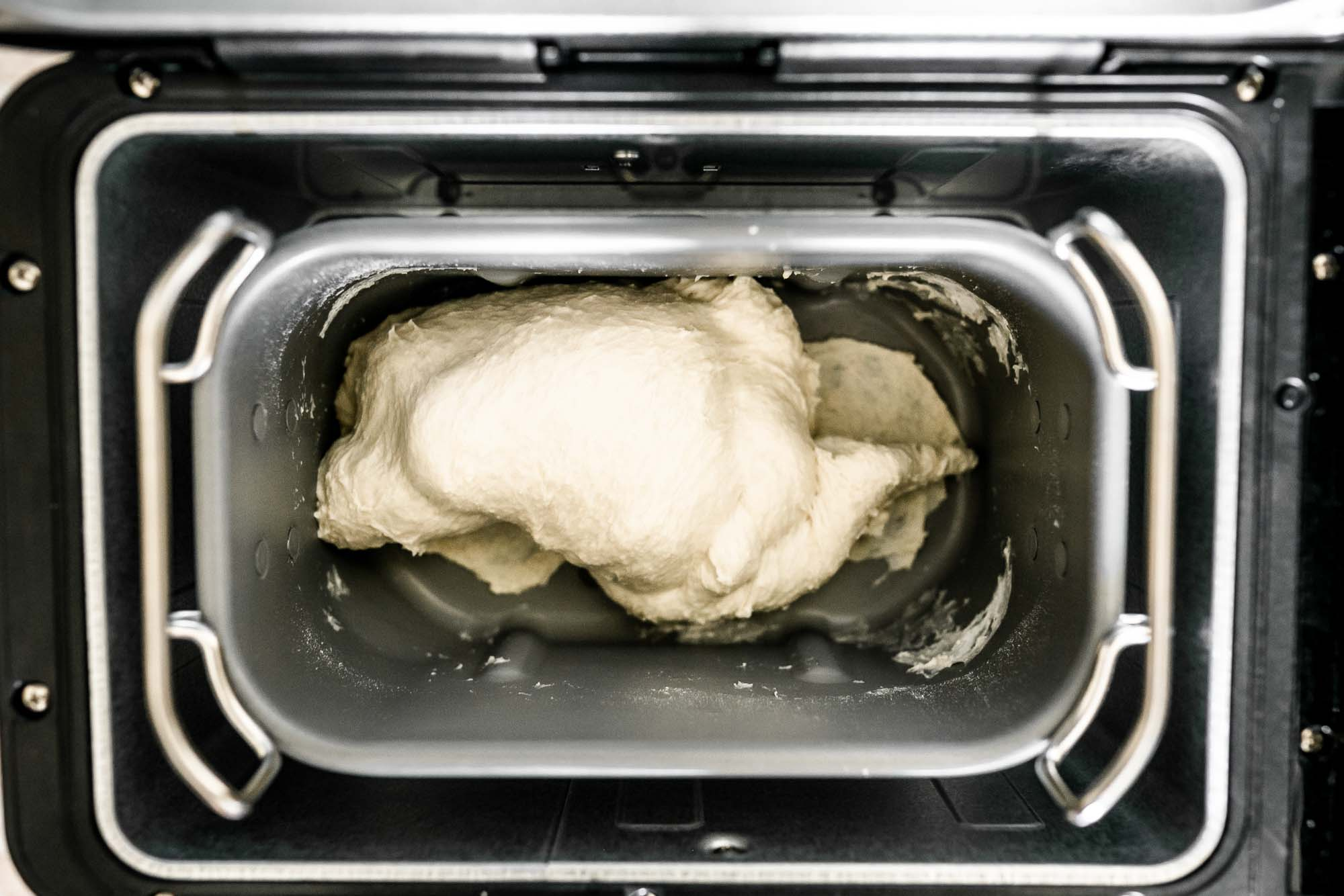
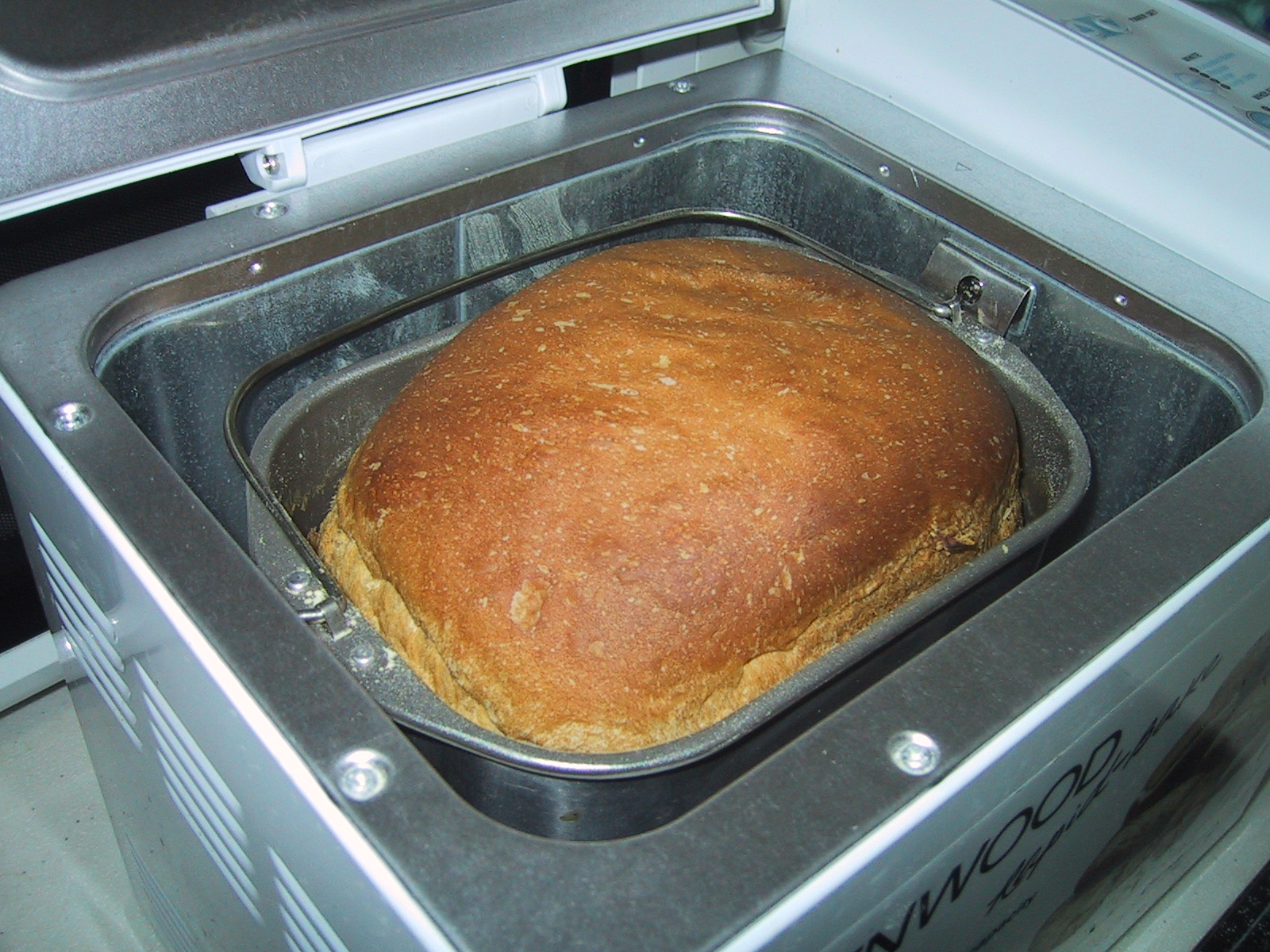
Bread machine kneading dough, and a baked loaf of bread.

Bread machine recipes are often somewhat smaller than standard bread recipes, and are sometimes standardized based on the capacity of the machine's pan; most common in the United States market are 1.5 lb/700 g units, and the majority of recipes are written for that capacity; however, 2 lb/900 g units are not uncommon. Packaged bread mixes are available, specifically designed for breadmakers, containing premeasured ingredients including flour and yeast, as well as flavorings and occasionally dough conditioners. Only water usually needs to be added.

Generally, homemade bread goes stale faster than bread from a commercial baker because the former does not include preservatives. However, it is possible (though a bit more difficult) to use a natural leaven or a pre-ferment in breadmaker dough recipes if the starter is sufficiently fast to rise. Sourdough contains a symbiotic culture of yeast and Lactobacteria; the yeast provides some flavor as well as carbon dioxide to provide lift, while lactic acid produced by sourdough's lactobacteria greatly preserves bread, as well as affecting its flavor, while pre-ferments provide some of the same benefits as a sourdough culture with the greater predictability of domesticated baker's yeast.

Breadmakers are often equipped with a timer to control when the breadmaking begins. This allows them, for example, to be loaded in the evening but only begin baking early in the morning, to produce a freshly baked loaf for breakfast. They can also be set only to make dough, for instance to be used to make hot dog buns. Some can also be set to make other things besides bread, such as jam, pasta dough, udon or mochi, a kind of Japanese rice cake. One of the most recent innovations is the facility to add nuts and fruit during the kneading process automatically from a tray.

Traditionally, breadmakers take between three and four hours to bake a loaf. However recently "fast bake" modes have become common additions, many of which are able to produce a loaf in under an hour.

Some breadmakers sold in the 1990s had vertical pans, some horizontal. Today, the vast majority available make horizontal loaves. For that reason, they produce a smaller, shorter loaf than their predecessors. It is more difficult to mix a long, horizontal loaf because the ends are distant from the mixer-paddle and gravity does not assist the distribution of the dough. Some machines attempt a better kneading by using two paddles, one at each end. A vertical loaf machine may require a higher powered motor, because the entire mass of the dough-ball is on the paddle as it kneads the dough against the nearby sides of the loaf pan.

== See also ==
- Convenience cooking
- Panettone
- Pullman loaf, bread baked in a narrow, lidded pan, that produces square slices of bread,
- Sliced bread
- Rotimatic
