= La cuisine en dix minutes =

1930 cookbook by Edouard de Pomiane

La Cuisine en dix minutes, ou l'Adaptation au rhythme moderne
- Cover of 1994 US English edition
- Author: Edouard de Pomiane
- Illustrator: André Giroux
- Language: French
- Subject: Culinary Arts, convenience cooking
- Genre: non-fiction
- Publisher: Éditions Paul Martial
- Publication date: 1930
- Publication place: France
- Media type: book

La cuisine en dix minutes, ou l'Adaptation au rhythme moderne (English title: French Cooking in Ten Minutes, or, Adapting to the Rhythm of Modern Life, also Cooking in Ten Minutes, or, Adapting to the Rhythm of Modern Life) by Édouard de Pomiane, published in 1930, was an early and influential title on the subject of convenience cooking. It attempted to render many of the basic techniques of classic French cooking into a quick form for people who did not have time to cook.

Compared to modern convenience cookbooks, almost everything is from scratch, though a good number of recipes call for canned vegetables (a modern cook might use frozen vegetables instead) as well as commercially available charcuterie products such as sausages and pâté. De Pomiane also adopts a rather tongue-in-cheek approach to writing and admonishes the reader to limit complexity and plan carefully.

The book has been translated into several languages. The first German translation appeared in 1935, the first English translation in 1948. The book is still popular, particularly in the English speaking part of the world. The latest English edition appeared in 2008, in 2010 the British Newspaper The Observer put it on rank 41 on its list of the 50 best cookbooks of all time.
