= The Strange Death of Labour Scotland =

Book by Gerry Hassan

- Authors: Gerry Hassan; Eric Shaw
- Language: English
- Subject: Politics of Scotland
- Published: Edinburgh
- Publisher: Edinburgh University Press
- Publication date: 2012
- Publication place: Scotland
- Media type: Print (Hardcover and Paperback)
- Pages: 358
- ISBN: 9780748640010
- Dewey Decimal: 324.241107

The Strange Death of Labour Scotland is a 2012 book about Scottish politics by Gerry Hassan and Eric Shaw.

== Synopsis ==
Hassan and Shaw examine the decline of Scottish Labour, culminating in it losing Scottish Parliament elections in 2007 and 2011 to the Scottish National Party. They analyse the period from the premiership of Margaret Thatcher to its election losses. They ask questions about the nature of Scottish Labour, its prior dominance of Scottish politics, the wider politics of Scotland, and whether the decline of the party is irreversible. Covering both contemporary events and recent history, the works draw on extensive research, including archival sources and interviews with key participants in the Scottish Labour Party.

== Reception ==
In The Independent, Owen Jones positively assessed the book and criticised Scottish Labour for allowing itself to be out-flanked on the left by the Scottish National Party, noting 'the party has apparently willingly sacrificed its role as Scotland's standard-bearer of social justice to the SNP' and suggesting Labour should become more radically left. In the New Statesman, Douglas Alexander, then Shadow Foreign Secretary and Member of the House of Commons of the United Kingdom for Paisley and Renfrewshire South, who lost his seat in 2015 to the SNP, wrote that the title of the book was 'outdated', citing the 2012 Scottish local elections as evidence of a Labour recovery. He did however note 'the authors are correct is in recognising the power of stories or myths in shaping our understanding of politics and society, recognising the limits of negativity in securing electoral success and being clear that Scottish Labour needs to change'. In The Herald, Iain Macwhirter wrote, 'the book is sometimes a little ponderously written, but it is comprehensive and authoritative, and the authors are to be congratulated for writing the first major study of the Scottish Labour Party.'
