= Rotimatic =

Kitchen robot

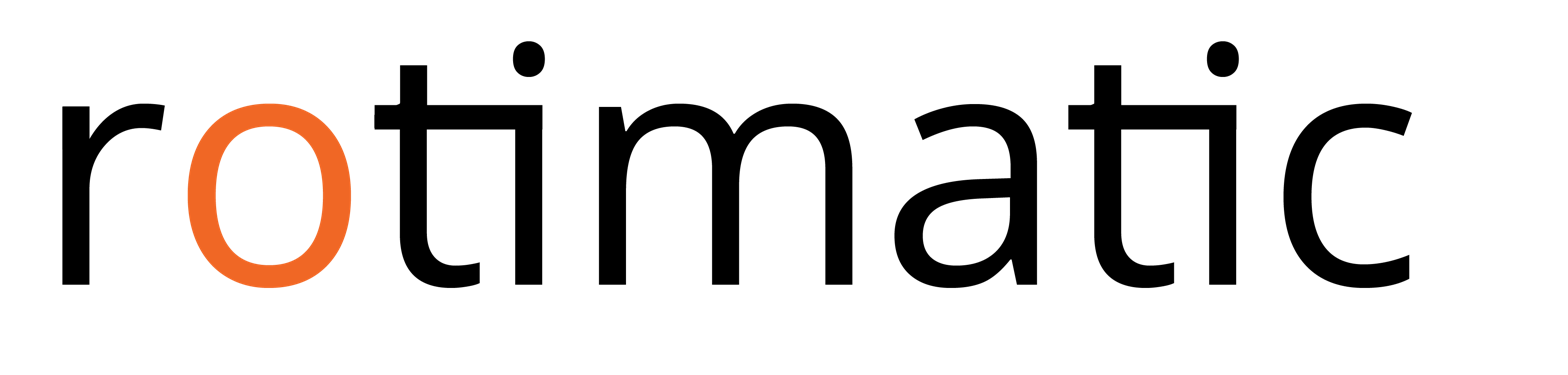

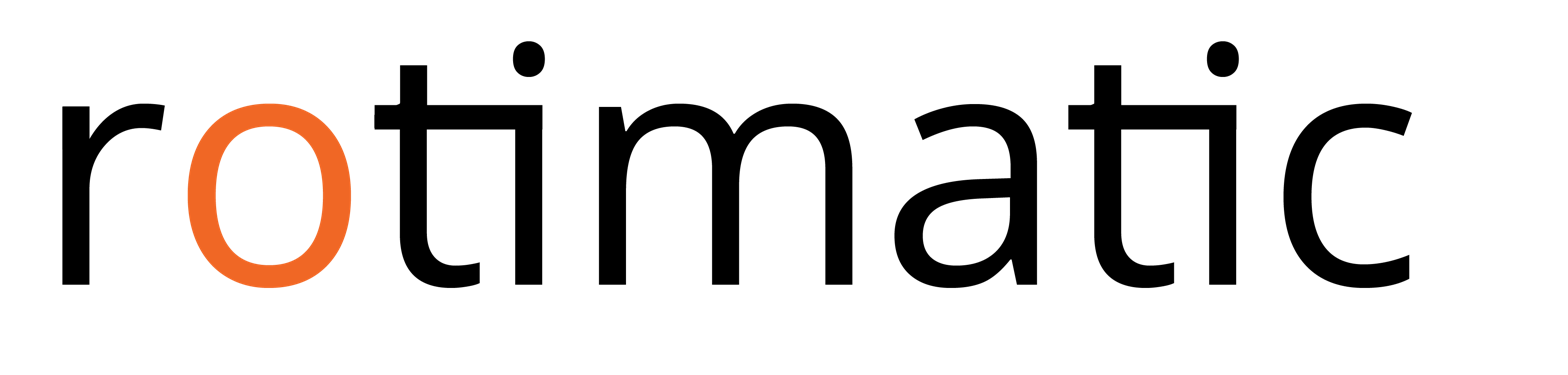
- Rotimatic logo
- Type: Kitchen appliance, robot
- Inventor: Pranoti Nagarkar-Israni; Rishi Israni
- Inception: June 28, 2008
- Manufacturer: Zimplistic Pte. Ltd.
- Available: United States; UK; Singapore; Canada; Australia; New Zealand; Middle East; Germany; India
- Website: rotimatic.com

Rotimatic was an automated kitchen appliance that makes flatbread. It was invented by Indian-origin couple Pranoti Nagarkar and Rishi Israni in 2008.

It was initially planned to be launched in 2012 but started taking US pre-orders in 2014 with an initial deposit for $59 towards the initial price of $699. It was first shipped in 2016, and is currently available in twenty markets. As of May 2018 it had sold 10,000 units and as of October 2018 it has generated a revenue of US$40 million.

Across all its units it had made 3 million rotis by July 2017 and 10 million rotis by January 2018.

== History ==
Pranoti Nagarkar and Rishi Israni established their company ZImplistic Pte Ltd,. in Singapore with Rotimatic as their flagship product. The pre-order campaign started in 2014 and the product was delivered in 2016 and 2017 in Singapore and the United States respectively. As of April 2018, it is available in a total of 20 markets including the United Kingdom, Canada, Australia, New Zealand, and the United Arab Emirates.

As of October 2020, Zimplistic, has been acquired by Light Ray Holdings, a special-purpose vehicle incorporated in the British Virgin Islands. As of April 2021, more than 70,000 Rotimatics have been sold across 20 countries (45,000 units in the U.S.)

== Inventor/Founder ==
Rotimatic was invented by Indian-born Pranoti Nagarkar and Rishi Israni. Nagarkar is a mechanical engineer and Israni studied computer science. They are the Co-Founder of Zimplistic Pte Ltd., which was incorporated in Singapore in 2008. Rotimatic is the flagship product of their company. They are both alumni of National University of Singapore. They have more than 35 patents under their belt.

== Investment ==
By April 2018, Zimplistic, had raised around US$45 million through four rounds of venture funding. According to Zimplistic, Rotimatic generated a revenue of US$40 million in the fiscal year 2017-2018 by selling nearly 40,000 machines, with pre-order sales generating US$5 million.

== Concept and design ==
To make roti (or other types of flatbread such as tortillas and puris), the user adds portions of flour, water, oil, and any additional ingredients into designated compartments to top up pre stored containers if needed. After selecting the thickness, softness, and 1 or 2 drops of oil, the user presses a button, and the machine then makes dough, flattens it, and cooks the roti in 90 seconds. Rotimatic can bake around 20 rotis starting from full compartments.

Rotimatic uses machine learning so each machine takes some time to make good bread; they are also connected to the internet for software upgrades. It takes about a minute to make one roti after the machine has been fully heated up which takes more than five minutes. It uses around 1800 watts of power, weighs around 18 kilograms, measures 16 by 16 inches, has 15 sensors, 10 motors, and 300 parts.

The worldwide retail price of Rotimatic as of April 2018 is US$999; a high end bread machine cost around $170 at that time. Rotimatic is manufactured in Malaysia.

The Rotimatic has undergone three design revisions:

1. 2012 - Original design
2. 2018 - The flour container was redesigned to widen the bottom opening to prevent clogging of the flour from steam backdrafts
3. 2023 - Rotimatic Plus was launched at a price of $1,699. The key difference is a rubber belt drive replacing the metallic chain which reduces the operating noise while flattening and cooking the rotis. With the launch of the Plus model, the original model was discontinued in 2024.

Around 2019 there were reports of Rotimatic launching a slimmed down smaller version targeted towards price sensitive markets like India for under ₹40,000.

== Reception ==
Mashable called Rotimatic the first robotic roti maker. It further added that Zimplistic claims that one Rotimatic roti costs roughly five cents. A store-bought roti would cost around 40 to 50 cents. Engadget referenced it as "the world's most expensive flatbread maker".

Customers have expressed mixed reactions with many loving it while others have trouble with reliability, consistency and expensive repairs leading to a used secondary market for these devices. There has been concern that the Rotimatic only supports the legacy 2.4GHz 802.11b standard making WiFi connectivity problematic for many users.

== Pricing ==
USD	Original	Plus	Next
2014^{(pre-order)}	$699		
2018	$999		
2021	$1,299		
2023	$1,499	$1,699	
2024		$1,499: $1,898	
2025			$1,749: $1,949

== Awards and recognition ==
- Best Kitchen Gadget by CES in 2016
- Best Consumer IoT Solution at 2020 IoT World Awards
- Open category winner at Start-Up@Singapore 2009

== See also ==
- Convenience cooking
- Domestic robot
- List of home appliances
- Instant Pot
- Moley Robotics MK1
