= Édouard de Pomiane =

French scientist, broadcaster and food writer (1875-1964)

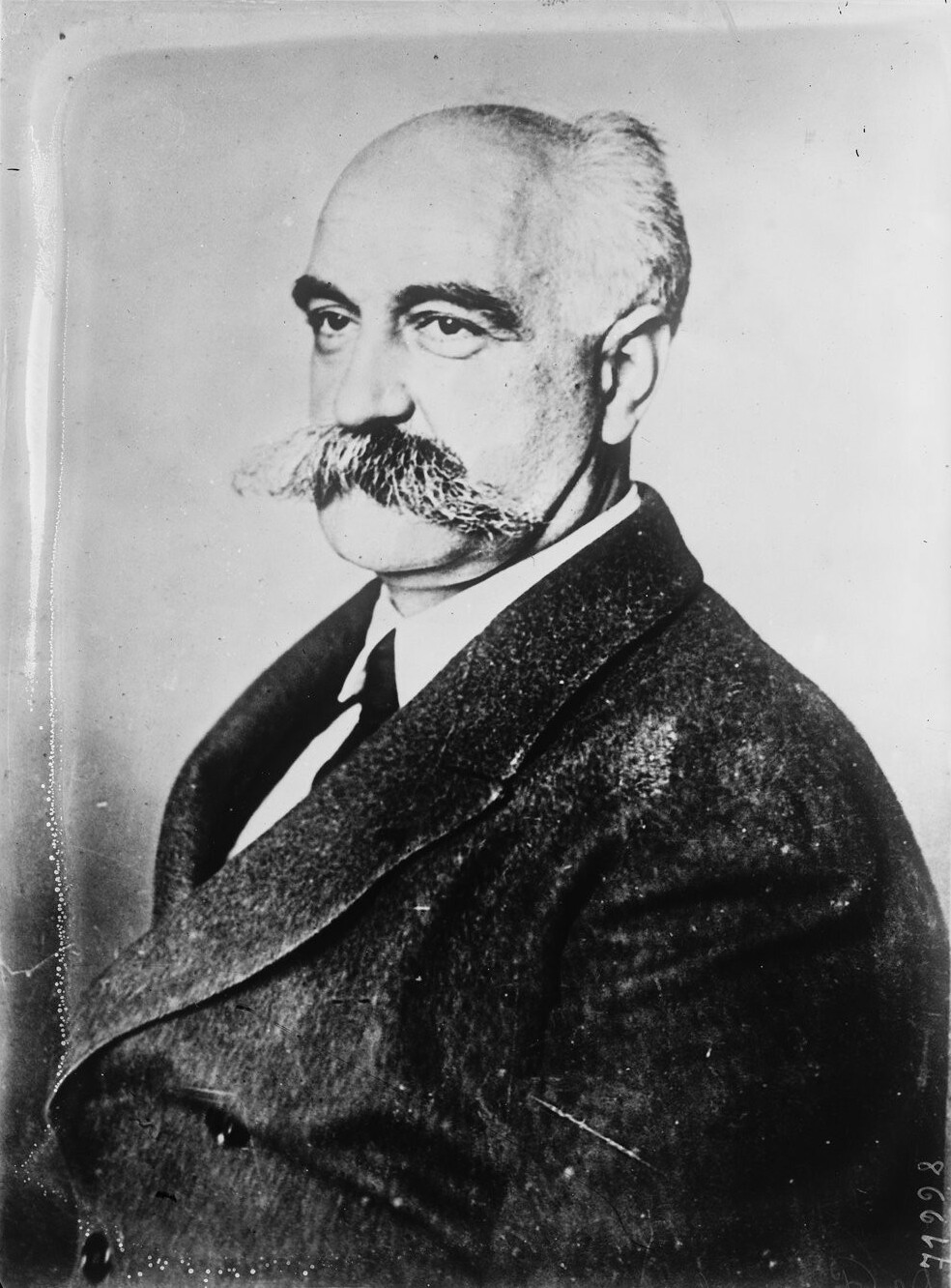
- In 1922
- Born: Édouard Alexandre Pozerski; 20 April 1875; Paris
- Died: 26 January 1964 (aged 88); Paris
- Occupations: Scientist, broadcaster, food writer

Édouard de Pomiane was the pen-name of Édouard Alexandre Pozerski (20 April 1875 – 26 January 1964), a French scientist, radio broadcaster and food writer. He pursued his academic career under his real name, but was known to the public under his pseudonym for his books and broadcasts about food.

Born in Paris to Polish exiles, Pozerski was educated in his native city and became an academic scientist, specialising in biology and medicine and particularly food chemistry and dietetics. As a hobby, which turned into a parallel career, he wrote for and lectured to a wide, non-academic audience under the Pomiane pseudonym, explaining the science behind cooking techniques and propounding the virtues of simpler cooking than that of classic French haute cuisine.

His admirers have included the food writers Elizabeth David and Richard Olney and the chef Raymond Blanc. Pomiane is credited with inspiring the generation of French chefs who introduced nouvelle cuisine in the 1960s, a simpler style of cooking than haute cuisine.

== Life and career ==
=== Early years ===
Pomiane, whose real name was Édouard Alexandre Pozerski, was born in Montmartre, in the 18th arrondissement of Paris, on 20 April 1875. His parents were Édouard Pozerski and his wife Olympe née Bielaiew. They were Polish nationalists who had fled to France after taking part in the 1863 Polish uprising against Russia. Olympe, the daughter of a Russian general, had escaped to France under sentence of death and Édouard had served a sentence in a penal colony in Siberia. In Paris their son grew up within the Polish exile community, attending the École polonaise – an establishment described by another Franco-Polish cookery writer, Ali-Bab, as one of ferocious austerity – and then the Lycée Condorcet.

After graduating in natural sciences, Pozerski joined Albert Dastre's laboratory at the Sorbonne as an unpaid volunteer. He supported himself by teaching mathematics, and wrote a doctoral thesis on digestive fermentation. In 1901, at the Academy of Sciences, Emile Duclaux, director of the Pasteur Institute, consulted his colleague Dastre about creating a post of préparateur (staff member who prepares students for forthcoming examinations) in the newly created physiology department of the institute. Dastre recommended Pozerski, who joined Duclaux's staff in May 1901.

Pozerski developed a new category of his subject, naming it Gastrotechnology – the scientific explanation of established principles of cookery. The food writer Elizabeth David, an admirer of Pomiane's books, wrote in 1967, "Many before him had attempted to explain cookery in scientific terms and had succeeded only in turning both science and cookery into the deadliest of bores".

Pozerski was twice married. In July 1906 he married Marie Tourtchine. His second wife was Charlotte Raymonde Watier, a fellow scientist with whom he collaborated on a couple of scientific papers. They had one daughter, Wanda.

=== First World War and 1920s ===
During the First World War Pozerski served as a medical adjutant and, after various front-line postings, ended the war serving in an advanced mobile surgical unit, and receiving the Croix de Guerre. During the war he began the writing of Bien manger pour bien vivre (Eating Well to Live Well). After the war he resumed his research at the Pasteur Institute in his small laboratory there, but post-war inflation left him in need of extra income, and for a while he had second jobs, playing the violin in the orchestra of a local cinema and working as an examiner for a large pharmacy on the Right Bank. He was able to give up these activities with the success of his teaching of gastrotechnology, and he returned to his research work.

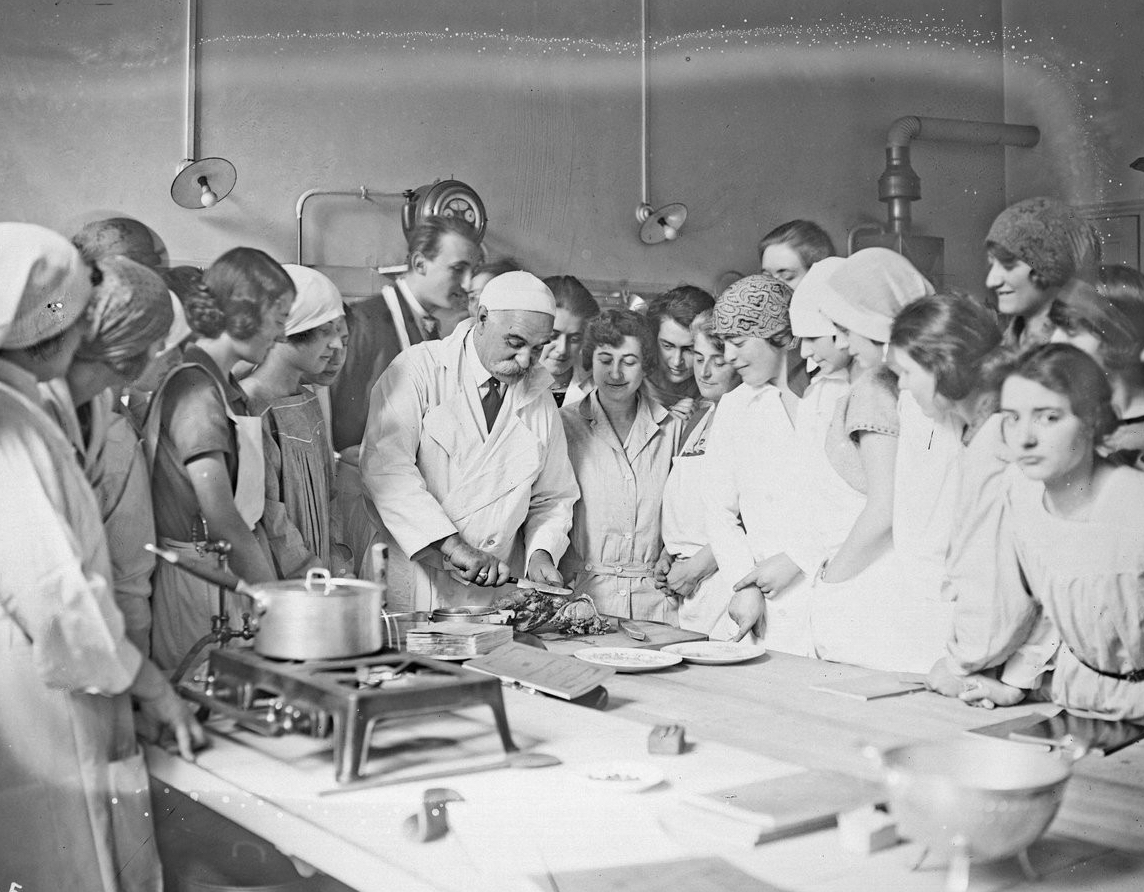
Teaching at the École supérieure de cuisine in 1925

His academic work did not distract Pozerski – in his capacity as Édouard de Pomiane – from his hobby and second profession of writing and talking about food. Bien manger pour bien vivre was published in 1922 by the Académie Française with a preface by a fellow gastronome, Ali-Bab, (also of Polish family and from a medical background). He published articles and gave lectures, and from 1923 to 1929, starred in weekly programmes on Radio Paris, in which he recounted stories about his culinary experiences and provided recipes illustrating his precepts. In a biographical sketch, M. M. Pack writes "Despite the fact that he was neither French nor a trained chef, these broadcasts contributed to his reputation as one of the most popular and widely respected cooks in France at the time, and made him, arguably, the food world’s first media personality".

=== Later years ===
In 1940 Pozerski reached the age of retirement from the Pasteur Institute, but he continued his work in a small laboratory set up for him in the attic. During the German occupation of France during the Second World War he organised public lectures and cooking demonstrations at the Institute to help people with cooking and eating under the severe rationing then in force. He demonstrated how to make the most of what food was available, how to derive the most nutritional value from it, how to make the best use of unrationed foods, and energy-efficient cooking techniques. Pack comments that titles of the books Pomiane published during the war reflect his concerns, such as Cuisine et restrictions (Cooking and Restrictions) and Manger quand-méme (Eating Anyway).

After his official retirement from the Pasteur Institute Pozerski continued his lectures for the Institute of Food Hygiene and acted as guide for visitors to the Pasteur Institute. An obituarist wrote:

None of the familiars of the house will be able to forget his white silhouette: blouse, apron, skullcap, white moustache (so as not to turn it yellow, he had stopped smoking), nor his smile, nor the kindness of his gaze, when he preceded the heterogeneous group of visitors, sometimes reduced to a class of little girls of the 8th grade whose soul a teacher wanted to elevate by a great example.

Pozersky died in Paris on 26 January 1964 at the age of 88.

== Works ==
Pozerski published more than 200 articles, notes and scientific books, and, as Édouard de Pomiane, he published more than twenty books about food and cookery:

Title	English translation	Date
Bien manger pour bien vivre	Eating Well to Live Well	1922
Le code de la bonne chère: 700 recettes simples	The Code of Good Food 700 Simple Recipes	1924
La cuisine en 6 leçons ou l'initiation à la cuisine familiale	Cooking in Six Lessons or an Introduction to Home Cooking	1926
Cuisine Juive: Ghettos modernes	Jewish Cuisine: Modern Ghettos	1929
La cuisine en dix minutes ou l'adaptation au rythme moderne	Cooking in Ten Minutes, or Adapting to the Rhythm of Modem Life	1930
La cuisine pour la femme du monde en 10 conférences	Cooking for the Woman of the World in 10 Discussions	1932
La cuisine et le raisonnement	Cooking and Reason	1934
Vingt plats qui donnent la goutte	Twenty Dishes that Cause Gout	1935
Pour mieux manger	To Eat Better	1935
La cuisine en plein air	Outdoor Cuisine	1935
Radio-cuisine, 1ère et 2ème séries	Radio-cuisine, 1st and 2nd Series	1936
365 Menus, 365 Recettes	365 Menus, 365 Recipes	1938
Réflexes et réflexions devant la nappe	Reactions and Reflections in Front of the Tablecloth	1940
Cuisine et restrictions	Cooking and Rationing	1940
Manger quand-même	Eating Anyway	1941
La goutte au compte-gouttes ou 47 adaptations gastronomiques	Drop by Drop, or 47 Gastronomic Adaptations	1943
Conserves familiales et microbiologie alimentaire	Family Conserves and Food Microbiology	1943
Bien manger pour vivre	Eat Well to Live	1948
Radio cuisine: Conférences gastronomiques diffusées par T.S.F.	Radio Cuisine: Gastronomic Discussions Broadcast by T.S.F.	1949
Le monde à table	The World at the Table	1952
La cuisine polonaise vue des bords de la Seine	Polish Cuisine Seen from the Banks of the Seine	1952
Le carnet d'Anna: histoire naturelle d'Anna	Anna's Notebook: Anna's Natural History	1967

Source: Culinary Biographies.

Some of Pomiane's works were published in translation. The French first edition of Radio-cuisine lists translations of his works published in London (Good Fare, 1932), Berlin (Kochen in Zehn Minuten and Die Fröliche Kunst des Kochens, 1935), Zurich (Kochen im Freien, 1935) Prague (Vesele Umeni Kucharske, 1936) and Warsaw (Nauka Przyrządzania Potraw w Sześciu Lekcjach, 1936). (Note: The German, Czech and Polish titles translate respectively as "Cooking in Ten Minutes", "The Happy Art of Cooking", "Outdoor Cooking", "The Happy Art of Cooking", and "Cooking in Six Lessons".)

Later English translations include Cooking with Pomiane (1962), a compilation of recipes and essays taken from his radio shows. In her foreword, Elizabeth David writes that Pomiane, "like all good teachers, makes light of his learning, and so makes learning easy for his readers. He takes the mystique out of cookery processes and still contrives to leave us with the magic". French Cooking in Ten Minutes, or Adapting to the Rhythm of Modern Life was published in English in 1977. In 1985 his 1929 Cuisine Juive: Ghettos modernes was published in English as The Jews of Poland: Recollections and Recipes. The translator, Josephine Bacon, described it as "...the only memoir of Polish Jewry between the wars written by a non-Jew, the only authentic collection of Polish-Jewish recipes, the only kosher cookbook ever written by a non-Jew".

== Reputation and legacy ==
David titled her biographical sketch of him, "Pomiane, Master of the Unsacrosanct", because he was a continual rebel against culinary orthodoxy and in particular the excess and over-richness of classical haute cuisine. He urged restraint and the greater use of vegetables and less excessive use of meat and fish. He propounded the virtues of simplicity in cooking, writing in the preface to La cuisine en dix minutes:

My book is meant for the student, for the shopgirl, for the clerk, for the artist, for lazy people, poets, men of action, dreamers and scientists, for everyone who only has an hour for lunch or dinner and yet wants half an hour of peace to watch the smoke of a cigarette while they sip a cup of coffee which has not even time to get cold. Modern life spoils so much that is pleasant. Let us see that it does not make us spoil our steak or our omelette. Ten minutes are sufficient – one minute more and all would be lost.

In David's words:

Caring not a jot for convention and the "classic" French menu of his day, Pomiane told his radio listeners and his readers that their meals were over-heavy and illogically composed. He did this not by telling them to count the calories and assess the vitamin content of their food but by pin-pointing the absurdity inherent in the accepted order of all middle-class French meals.

Pomiane's precepts were a strong influence on the generation of French chefs who introduced nouvelle cuisine in the 1960s and 1970s. Other admirers have included the food writer Richard Olney and the chef Raymond Blanc; the latter names Pomaine as his hero – "one of the first people to have queried the establishment, the static traditions and the taboos of French cuisine. He wanted to make cooking accessible, demystify it and especially to associate it with an act of loving and giving".

Pomiane also explained in easily comprehensible terms the science behind culinary techniques. David comments, "In cooking, the possibility of muffing a dish is always with us. Nobody can eliminate that. What de Pomiane did by explaining the cause, was to banish the fear of failure".

In 1995 BBC Television broadcast a six-part series called French Cooking in Ten Minutes, "As much a drama as a cookery series, it dramatises Édouard de Pomiane's 1930s culinary classic, Cooking in Ten Minutes".

== Notes, references and sources ==
=== Sources ===
==== Books ====
- David, Elizabeth (1986) [1984]. An Omelette and a Glass of Wine. London: Penguin. ISBN 978-0-14-046721-5.
- David, Elizabeth (2009) [1962]. "Foreword". Cooking with Pomiane. London: Serif. ISBN 978-1-897959-64-0.
- Pack, M. M. (2006). "Édouard de Pomiane". In Alice Arndt (ed.). Culinary Biographies. Houston: YES Press. ISBN 978-0-97-183221-3.
- Pomiane, Edouard de (1936). Radio Cuisine. Paris: Albin Michel. OCLC 18117548.

==== Journals ====
- Brossollet, Jacqueline (1989). "L'Institut Pasteur vu par un gastronome" (PDF). Histoire des sciences médicales (in French): 45–50.
- J-C. L. (June 1964). "Édouard Pozerski". Annales de l'Institute Pasteur (in French): 813–818.
