= George Dangerfield =

American journalist

George Bubb Dangerfield (28 October 1904 – 27 December 1986) was a British-born American journalist, historian, and the literary editor of Vanity Fair from 1933 to 1935. He is known primarily for his book The Strange Death of Liberal England (1935), a classic account of how the Liberal Party in Great Britain ruined itself in dealing with the House of Lords, women's suffrage, the Irish question, and labour unions, 1906–1914. His book on the United States in the early 19th century, The Era of Good Feelings, won the 1953 Pulitzer Prize for History.

== Biography ==
Dangerfield was born in Newbury, Berkshire, England, and educated at Forest School, Walthamstow (then in Essex). His first memory, he wrote in his thirties, was "of being held up to a window and shown Halley's Comet" in 1910. In 1927 he received his B.A. from Hertford College, Oxford. In 1930 he moved to the United States, married Mary Lou Schott in 1941, and became an American citizen in 1943.

Dangerfield's The Strange Death of Liberal England (1935) is an account of the failure of the Liberals to deal effectively with increasingly vehement demands from Irish Unionists and Irish Nationalists, industrial workers, and suffragettes. It was not given much attention by academic historians when it first appeared, but it has gained admirers because of its lively style and its trenchant analysis. In 1941 Dangerfield published Victoria's Heir: The Education of a Prince, a work on the early life of Edward VII.

After serving with the US Army's 102nd Infantry Division during World War II, Dangerfield returned to the study of history and wrote The Era of Good Feelings (1952), a history of the period between the presidencies of James Madison and Andrew Jackson, from the start of the War of 1812 to the start of Jackson's administration on 4 March 1829. Dangerfield characterises the period as constituting the transition "from the great dictum that central government is best when it governs least to the great dictum that central government must sometimes intervene strongly on behalf of the weak and the oppressed and the exploited." The book won the 1953 Bancroft Prize and the 1953 Pulitzer Prize for History. He followed up his work on this period with The Awakening of American Nationalism: 1815–1828 (1965), an instalment in Harper & Row's series "The New American Nation".

A Guggenheim Fellowship in 1970 remunerated Dangerfield for an extended research stay in Europe. In the UK and in Ireland, he collected material for his last book, The Damnable Question: A Study of Anglo-Irish Relations, which was a finalist for the National Book Critics Circle Award in General Nonfiction in 1976.

== Personal life ==
Dangerfield was the father of two daughters, Mary Jo Lewis and Hilary Fabre, and a son, Anthony. He died of leukaemia in Santa Barbara, California, where he had taught for a few years at the University of California, Santa Barbara.

== Quotations ==
- If the novel can go to history, history can go to the novel, at least to the extent of bringing a creative imagination to bear upon its characters.... History, which reconciles incompatibles, and balances probabilities, by its very nature eventually reaches the reality of fiction. And that is the highest reality of all.
- When codes, when religions, when ideas cease to move forward, it is always in some shining illusion that an alarmed humanity attempts to take refuge.—The Strange Death of Liberal England, 343 (Stanford University Press ed., 1997)

== Bibliography ==
- Bengal Mutiny: The Story of the Sepoy Rebellion (1933)
- The Strange Death of Liberal England (1935) — online
- Victoria's Heir: The Education of a Prince (1941)
- 102d thru Germany: WWII Unit History, 102nd Infantry Division (1945)
- The Era of Good Feelings (1952) — 1953 Pulitzer Prize for History
- Chancellor Robert R. Livingston of New York, 1746–1813 (1960)
- The Awakening of American Nationalism, 1815–1828 (1965)
- The Damnable Question: A History of Anglo-Irish Relations (1976)
