= Robam Appliances =

Chinese manufacturer of kitchen appliances

Hangzhou Robam Appliances Co., Ltd.
- Native name: 杭州老板电器股份有限公司
- Type: Public
- Traded as: SZSE: 002508
- Industry: Appliance manufacturing
- Predecessor: Yuhang County Hongxing Hardware Factory
- Founded: May 28, 1979; 47 years ago in Hangzhou, China
- Founder: Jianhua Ren
- Headquarters: No.592 Linping Avenue, Linping, Hangzhou, Zhejiang, China
- Area served: China
- Key people: Jianhua Ren (chairman); Fujia Ren (vice chairman, general manager)
- Products: Kitchen appliances Small appliances Kitchen hood Oven; Gas stove
- Brands: ROBAM
- Revenue: ▼CN¥10.11 billion (2025)
- Operating income: ▼CN¥1.255 billion (2025)
- Net income: ▼CN¥1.163 billion (2025)
- Total assets: ▲CN¥17.21 billion (2025)
- Owner: Jianhua Ren
- Number of employees: 4,980 (2025)
- Website: www.robamworld.com

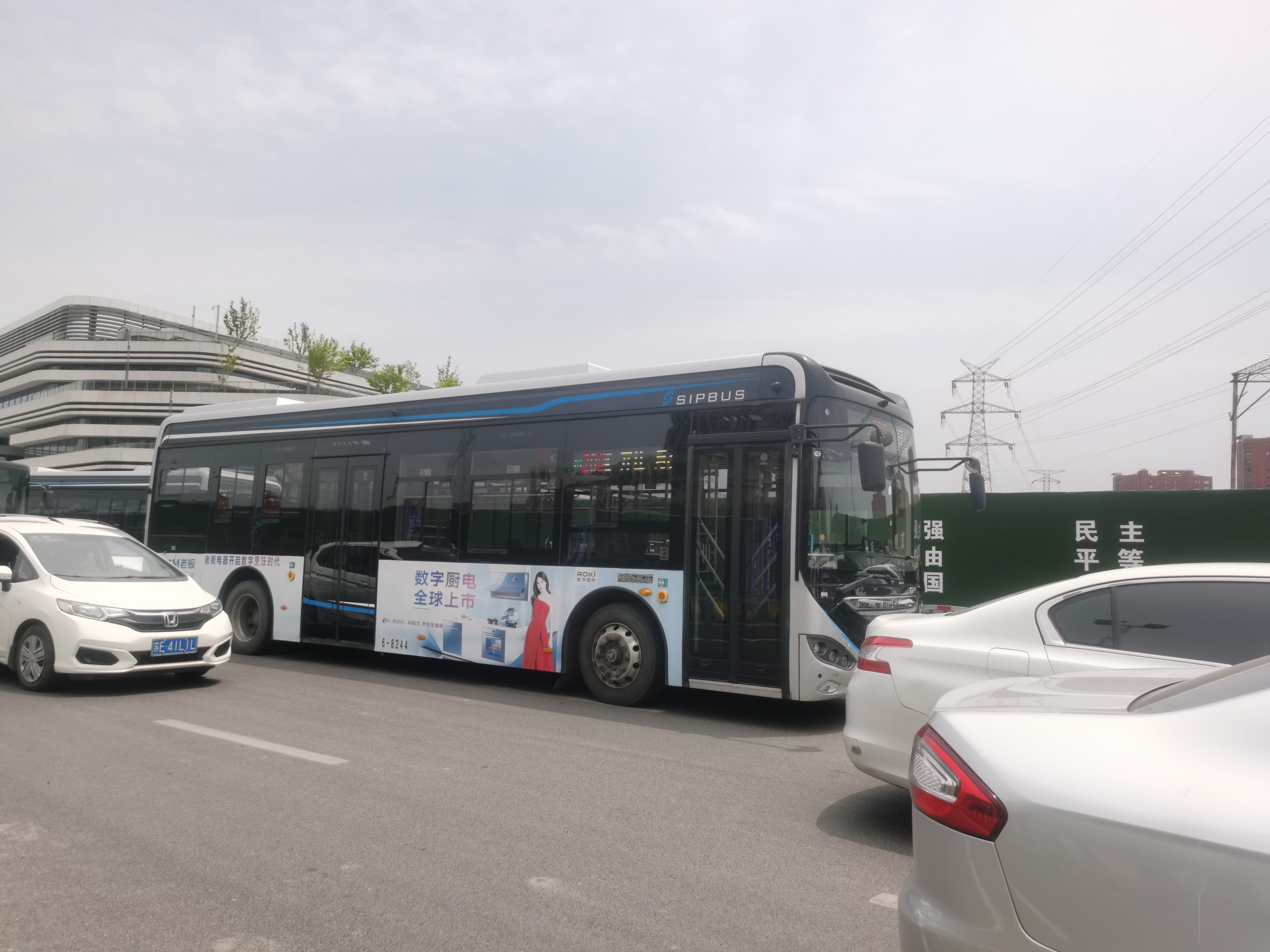
Bus advertisements placed by Robam Appliances on Suzhou public buses

Hangzhou Robam Appliances Co., Ltd., commonly known as Robam Appliances, is a Chinese manufacturer of kitchen appliances headquartered in Hangzhou, Zhejiang.

The company is listed on the Shenzhen Stock Exchange under stock code 002508. Its products include range hoods, gas stoves, dishwashers, combi-steam ovens, water purifiers, gas water heaters, and other kitchen appliances.

the company was among the early Chinese businesses to develop kitchen hood products and later became a Shenzhen-listed appliance manufacturer.

== History ==
In May 1979, Ren Jianhua—then the village head of Luoshiqiao Village in Yuhang County—established a township enterprise named the "Hongxing Hardware Factory".

In 1987, the factory collaborated with the 804 Research Institute of the Ministry of Aerospace Industry to develop China's first range hood.

In 1989, Laoban began advertising on China Central Television (CCTV), becoming the first enterprise in the industry to do so.

In 1995, Ren Jianhua registered the English trademark "ROBAM." He explained that "ROBAM" embodies the aspiration to build a brand that is responsible, progressive, and respected.

In 1998, Robam launched a range hood that required no disassembly or cleaning. Starting in 2000, the company successively introduced products such as gas cooktops, disinfection cabinets, and small kitchen appliances.

In November 2010, Robam Appliances was listed on the Shenzhen Stock Exchange, becoming one of the first kitchen appliance enterprise in mainland China to go public.

Robam also introduced a series of new technologies; for instance, in 2012, it partnered with Wuhan University to incorporate IoT technology into its kitchen appliances.

On December 17, 2013, Robam Appliances announced that Ren Jianhua had resigned as general manager and was succeeded by his son, Ren Fujia.

By 2017, Forbes described Robam as a listed company and a regular entrant on Forbes Asia's Best Under A Billion list. The same profile reported that Ren Fujia, son of founder Ren Jianhua, had taken day-to-day leadership of the company after joining the business in 2006, while Ren Jianhua remained chairman.

For the 2022 Asian Games, Robam Appliances signed an agreement with the Hangzhou Asian Games Organizing Committee to become the exclusive official supplier of home kitchen appliances; the company's full suite of digital kitchen appliances was installed in the Asian Games Village, and a central kitchen exhaust purification system was deployed in the Asian Games dining facilities.

== Business and products ==
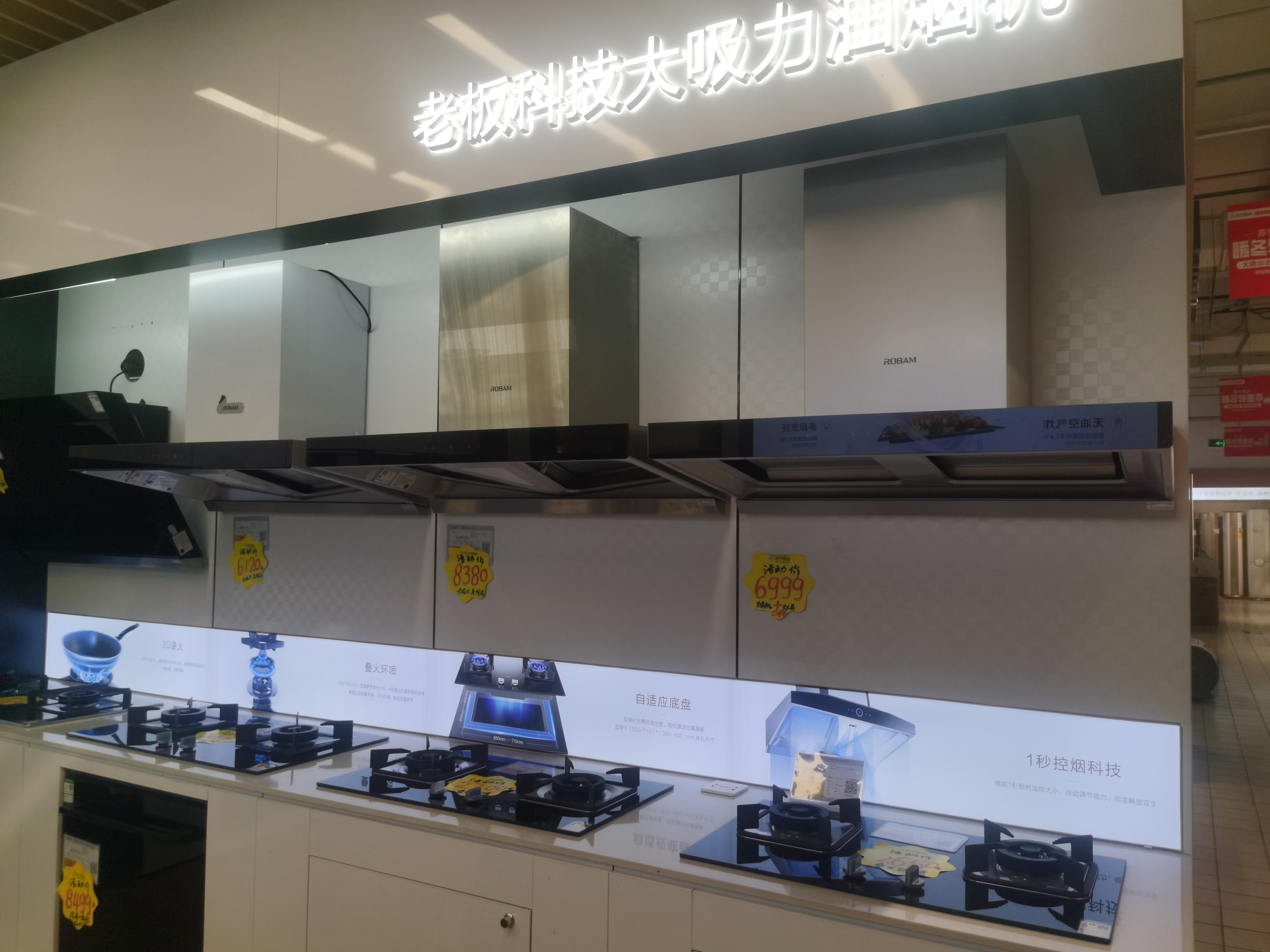
Robam Range Hood and Gas Stove

Robam Appliances' products are primarily categorized into three main groups: range hoods, cooktops, and sterilizers; electric cooking appliances; and kitchen water appliances. Additionally, the portfolio includes integrated appliance products.

- Kitchen Hoods, Gas stoves & Sterilizers
  - Kitchen hoods
  - Gas stoves
  - Sterilization cabinets
- Electric Cooking Appliances
  - Steam-bake combination ovens
  - Steam ovens
  - Ovens
- Water & Kitchen Appliances
  - Dishwashers
  - Tankless water heating
  - Water filter
- Integrated Appliances
  - Integrated cooking centers
  - Integrated stove
  - Integrated range hoods
- Refrigerators

The company's business is concentrated in kitchen and bathroom appliances. In its 2025 annual report, Robam reported operating revenue of approximately US$1.51 billion and net profit attributable to shareholders of approximately US$188 million, converted from the company's reported renminbi figures. Range hoods accounted for about 49.28% of revenue in 2025, while gas stoves accounted for about 24.77%.

Robam has also expanded beyond traditional appliance categories. The China Project reported in 2022 that the company had launched a digital kitchen appliance brand, ROKI, intended to use artificial intelligence in cooking by modelling temperature, humidity, and duration.
