= TurboSwing =

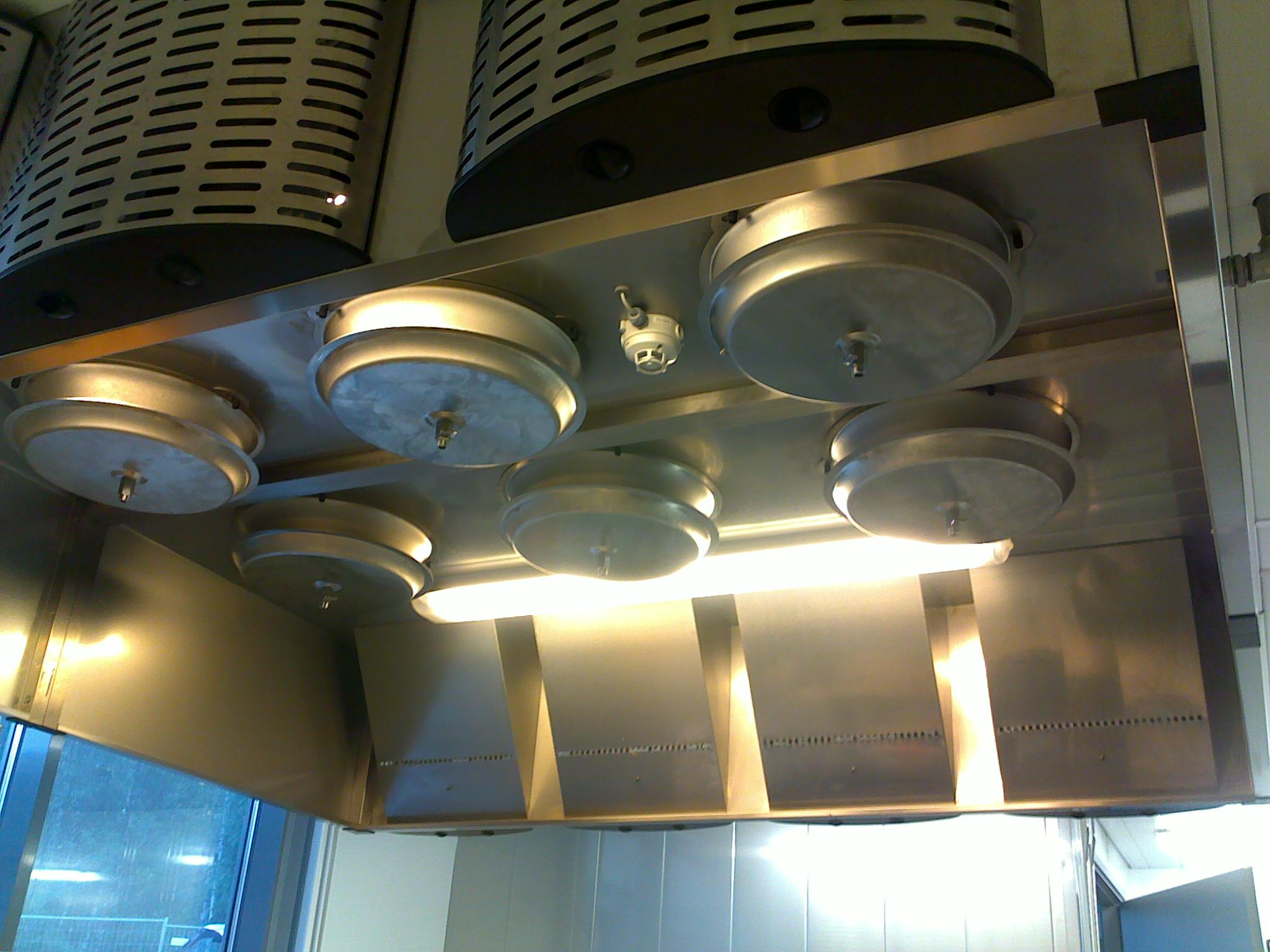
Extractor hood with turboswing filters

Turboswing is a type of grease filter used in kitchen ventilation to remove grease particles from the air. It is typically installed inside the extractor hoods of restaurant kitchens. Its operation is based on a rotating filtering medium.

== How it works ==
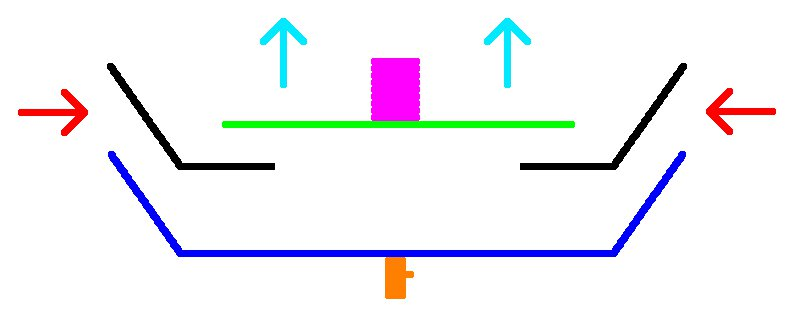
Basic structure of a turboswing filter: Dirty air going into the filter Upper dome Lower dome Rotating perforated separation disk Motor Clean air going into the ventilation ducts Drain valve

The main difference between turboswing and most common filters is that in turboswing filters the filtering medium is not static. There is a perforated disk rotating at high speed. When the grease particles go through the rotating disk they are separated from the air.

After separation, centrifugal force due to the rotating disk throws particles against the inner walls of the filter. Particles then drip down the walls of the chamber onto the lower collection basin, where they stay until they are removed through the tap at the bottom of the filter dome.

== Smaller particles ==
Turboswing filters can remove grease particles starting from 4μm, as opposed to 8μm for common filters. This is because the filtering medium is moving, and this increases the probability of collision between the filter and the particle.

== Varying airflow ==
Turboswing filters can work with varying airflows. The grease extraction level is not affected by the airflow. This means that this kind of filter can be used in restaurants that turn down the air volumes at non-peak times in order to save energy.

The explanation is that if the airflow is lower, the particles go through the rotating disk at a slower speed, therefore increasing, the collision probability. Other filters like cyclonic filters require the airflow to be high on a permanent basis, or else the performance of the filter drops. Therefore, the use of filters like turboswing make it possible to save vast amounts of energy in restaurant kitchen ventilation.

== Heat recovery ==
Turboswing grease filters make it possible to do heat recovery with the air of a kitchen. Unlike common filters, turboswing filters extract the small particles responsible for making the heat exchanger dirty.

Heat recovery makes it possible to save energy in the ventilation of a building. In particular, kitchen air is hotter than the air in most other rooms, and therefore a large amount of energy can potentially be saved. However, when it comes to the ventilation of a kitchen, if the correct kind of filter is not used, heat recovery can be very difficult or even impossible, because of the presence of grease particles in the air. Grease particles accumulate at the heat exchanger, rendering it useless very quickly.

In order to have heat recovery in a kitchen, the air must be completely clear of grease, in other words, both large and small grease particles must be removed from the air. Static filters cannot adequately deal with small particles, therefore making it impossible to recover heat. Turboswing filters exhibit high performance in dealing with small particles, and this is why they enable heat recovery to be done with kitchen air.
