= Kitchen ventilation =

Treatment of air from kitchens

Kitchen ventilation is the branch of ventilation specialising in the treatment of air from kitchens. It addresses the problems of grease, smoke and odours not found in most other ventilation systems.

Restaurant kitchens often use large extractor hoods

Kitchen ventilation equipment includes an extractor hood or canopy, and a filtering system. The system's fan may be located in the kitchen or in its ducts.

== Benefits of kitchen ventilation ==
It has been found that cooking is a major source of indoor air pollutants, including particulate matter, cooking oil fumes, and pollutants contributing volatile organic compounds (VOCs) in the atmosphere. The release of cooking particles could be dependent on a few factors including, but not limited to, the cooking temperature, fuels, and methods, regional cooking styles, and edible oil use.

Cooking emissions can pose as potentially harmful health effects, with the severity increasing as cooking particulates decrease in size and concentrations increase. Health effects related to cooking particulate matter and cooking oil fumes include lung cancer, respiratory diseases, cardiac effects, renal effects, and dermal effects. Kitchen ventilation methods and systems can be utilized to decrease the airborne pollutants associated with cooking by increasing air exchange.

== Kitchen ventilation best practices ==
When cooking in residential kitchens, there are multiple kitchen ventilation best practices to consider. If there is ventilation equipment that leads outside, cooking on the back stovetop burners with the range hood on helps to capture more cooking emissions. After cooking commences, leave the range hood running for 10-20 minutes. It is also important to keep the cooking area and ventilation systems clean. If there is no ventilation equipment that leads outside, naturally ventilate the room by opening windows and doors. It is important that it is safe to naturally ventilate room and the weather and outdoor air quality is suitable to do so. Non-ozone producing air cleaners can be utilized to filter the air while cooking if sized properly for the effected space.

== Characteristics of successful kitchen ventilation systems ==
An adequate kitchen ventilation system should aim to withdraw cooking fumes as close to the source as possible. The kitchen ventilation system should exchange hot air from the kitchen for cool, clean air in order to maintain a comfortable environment, but without hindering combustion of appliances that use fire nor risking carbon monoxide accumulation. The air flow should not cause discomfort because the kitchen staff may experience heat stress and lethargy if proper ventilation is not maintained, creating potentially unsafe working conditions. The ventilation system should not disturb the kitchen in terms of volume and vibration. Finally, the kitchen ventilation should be easy to clean because unclean or blocked ventilation systems can increase the fire risk and decrease system efficiency.

== Kitchen ventilation design ==
The design of an effective kitchen ventilation system is determined by:

- The kitchen's workload
- The amount, type and power of cooking equipment
- The kitchen's layout and shape
- The number of kitchen staff
- The need for easy cleaning and maintenance
- Energy efficiency

Hot air from cooking is usually vented externally through a chimney system. When this is not possible, recirculating cooker hoods are used that clean the air and direct it back into the kitchen.

== Grease filters ==
The most common types of grease filters used in professional kitchens are:

- Water-based
- Cyclonic
- Ultraviolet (UV)
- TurboSwing

== See also ==
- Indoor air quality
