= Cooktop =

Device that applies heat to the base of cookware

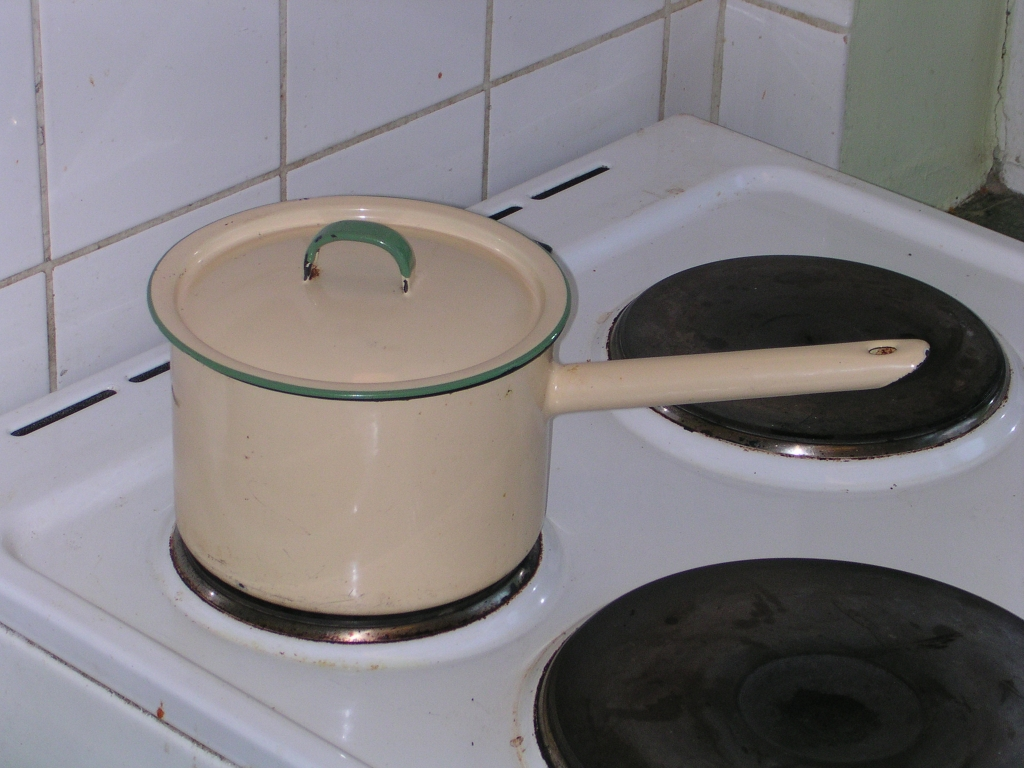
An electric plate cooktop

A cooktop (American and Canadian English), hob (British English), or stovetop (general) is a device commonly used for cooking that is typically found in kitchens and used to apply heat to the base of pans or pots. Cooktops are often found integrated with an oven into a kitchen stove but may also be standalone devices. Cooktops are most often powered by gas or electricity, although oil or other fuels are sometimes used.

A cooktop may also be called a stove or range, though in more formal usage these refer collectively to the stovetop and the furnace or appliance beneath.

== Gas ==
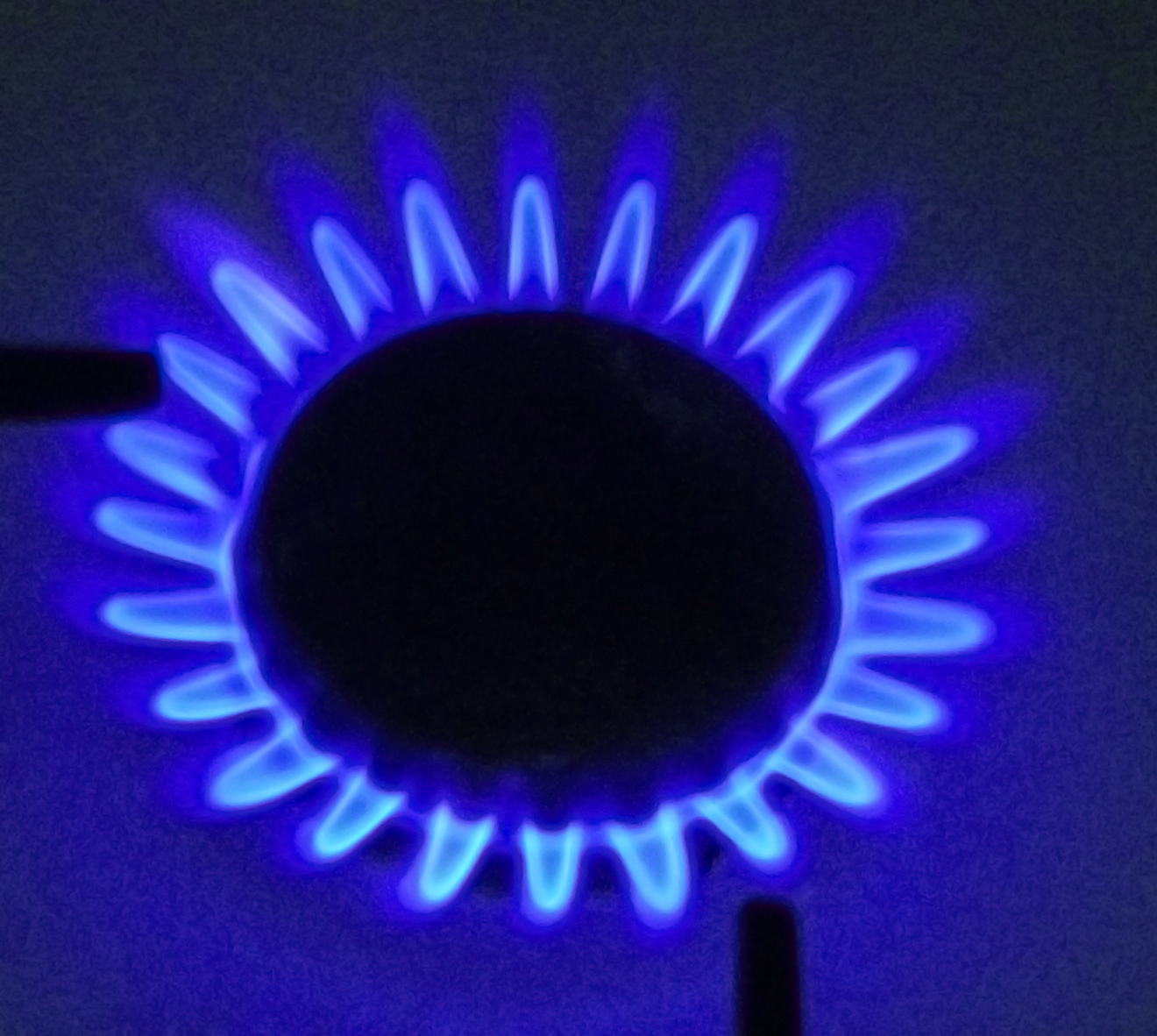
Gas cooktop flame

Gas cooktops consist of one or more gas burners with arrangements to control the rate of flow. They often have integral lighters or (in older models) pilot lights, and may have safety interlocks designed to reduce the risk of hazardous gas leaks.

Gas cooking has been associated with negative health effects, such as reduced pulmonary function and a higher rate of respiratory symptoms in children.

== Electric ==
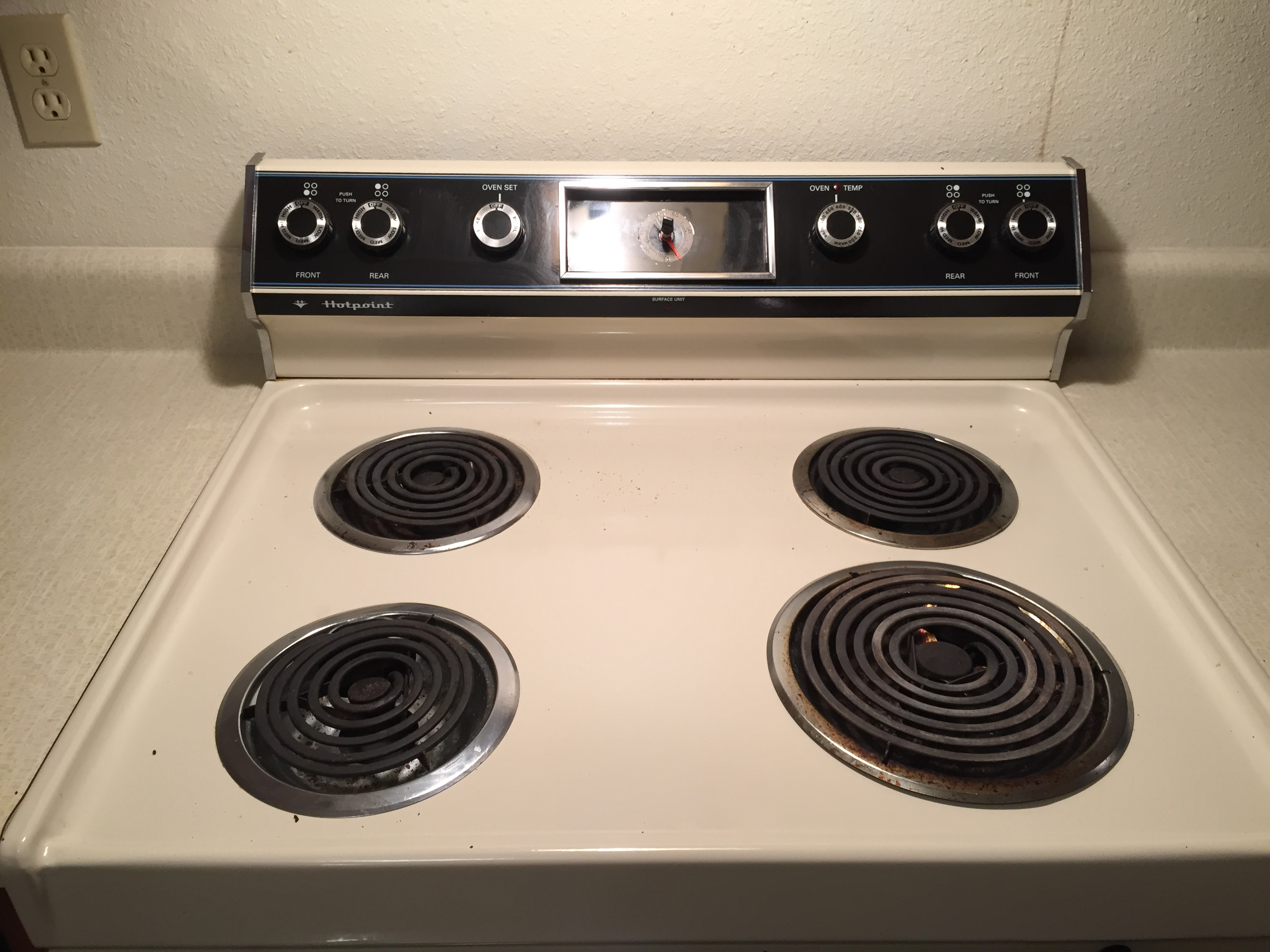
A coil-top electric range

=== Coil ===
An electric coil cooktop uses electric elements that directly heat pots placed on them. They are inexpensive to buy and maintain, but are considered more difficult to clean than smooth-top or plate models.

=== Plate ===
An electric plate cooktop is similar to a coil cooktop but uses plate-like base supports as opposed to coil supports.

=== Ceramic radiation heating ===
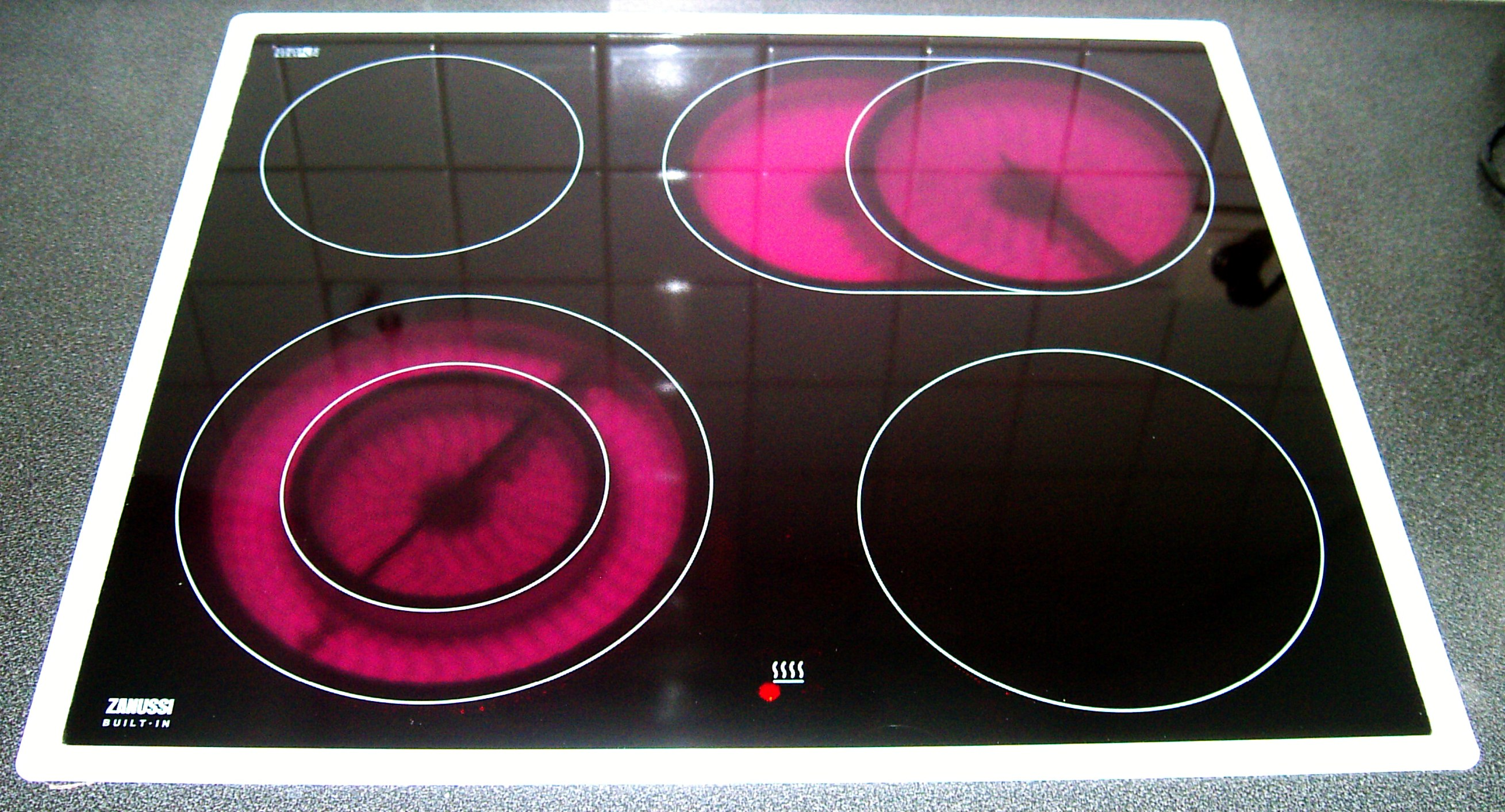
A ceramic hob with two dual-zone radiant heaters

A ceramic radiation heating cooktop or radiant cooktop has a surface made of low-expansion thermal glass-ceramic that is transparent to infrared. This surface houses radiant or halogen heaters below it. These heaters primarily radiate heat as infrared light, hence the term radiant. Radiant heaters are made of resistive nichrome wire atop a silica microporus ceramic insulating base whereas halogen cooktops use halogen lamps on top of a reflector. The advantage of this arrangement is that the heat can be quickly controlled. These cooktops are often simply called ceramic cooktop or ceramic-glass cooktop, because they were the first type of cooktop to use glass-ceramic—however, other types of cooktops also use glass-ceramic surfaces, notably induction cooktops.

=== Induction ===
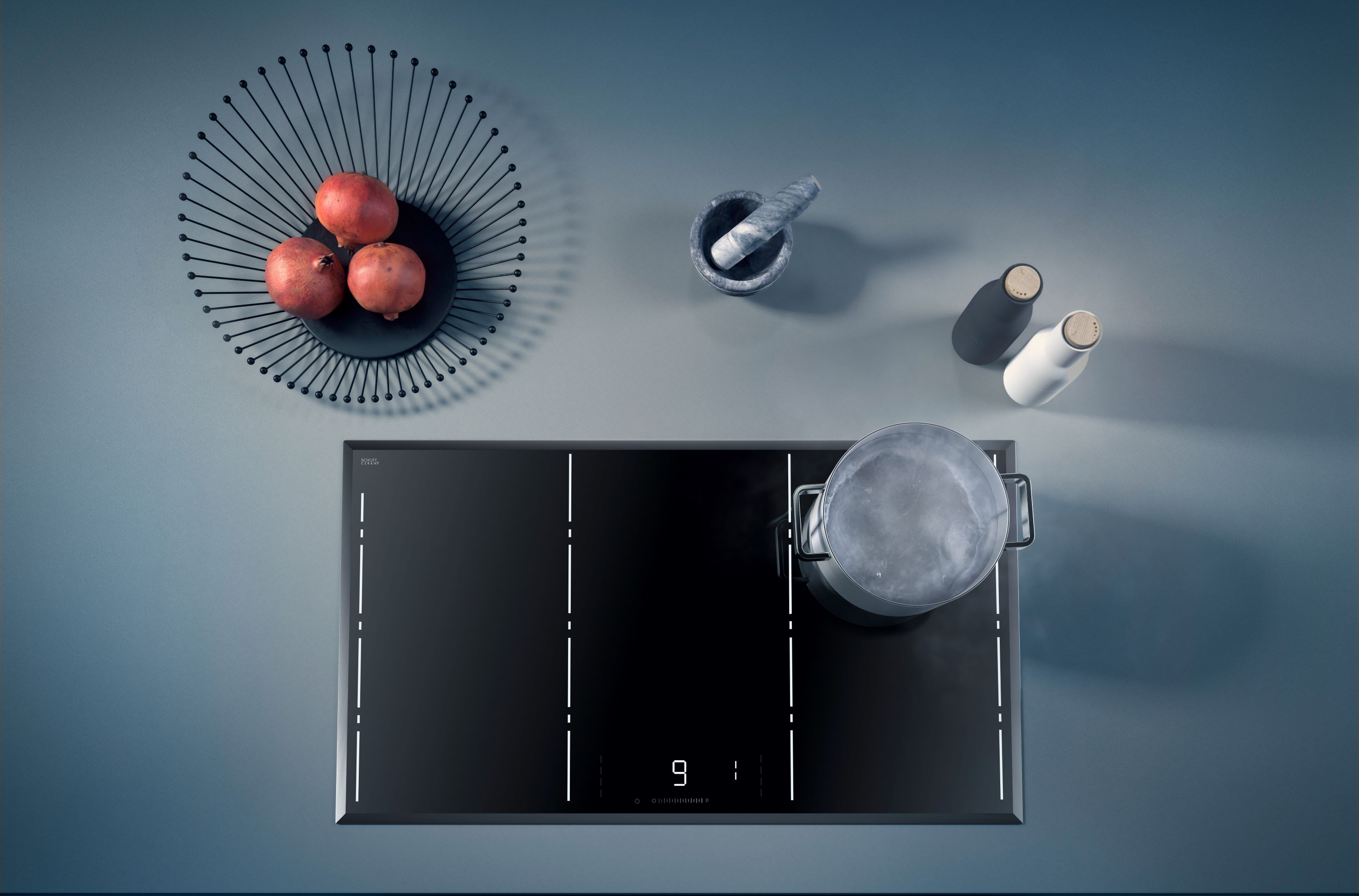
Top view of a Ceran induction cooktop

An induction cooktop involves the electrical heating of a cooking vessel by magnetic induction instead of by radiation or thermal conduction from an electrical heating element or from a flame. Because inductive heating directly heats the vessel, very rapid increases in temperature can be achieved and changes in heat settings are fast, similar to gas.

In an induction cooktop ("induction hob" or "induction stove"), a coil of copper wire is placed under the cooking pot, and an alternating electric current is passed through it. The resulting oscillating magnetic field induces a magnetic flux that repeatedly magnetises the pot, treating it like the lossy magnetic core of a transformer. This produces large eddy currents in the pot, which, because of the resistance of the pot, heat it.

For nearly all models of induction cooktops, a cooking vessel must be made of, or contain, a ferromagnetic metal such as cast iron or some stainless steels. However, copper, glass, non-magnetic stainless steels, and aluminum vessels can be used if placed on a ferromagnetic disk that functions as a conventional hotplate.

Induction cooking is quite efficient, which means it puts less waste heat into the kitchen, can be quickly turned off, and has safety advantages compared to gas stoves. Cooktops are also usually easy to clean, because the cooktop itself does not get very hot.

If the induction coil is of lesser diameter than the cooking pot, and the pot has low thermal conductivity, use of high power can potentially warp the pot due to non-uniform heating. 6" coils are common in low-end portable units, which is smaller than most pots and pans.

=== Electric plasma ===
Electric plasma arc cooktops are designed to be similar to gas stoves, but without using liquid or gaseous fuel. Whereas a gas stove creates a plasma as a gas flame, electric plasma cooktops convert mains electricity into high-voltage electricity using a high-voltage power supply at high frequency beyond the audible frequency range for humans to eliminate electric arc noise and stabilize the arc, and then pass it between two electrodes via dielectric breakdown through air, creating a visible electric arc, which is plasma, up to a few centimeters in length, depending on the design of the electrodes. The electrodes and electric arc are exposed to air, similarly to a gas flame in a gas burner.

The electrodes are arranged in pairs and several pairs make up a burner. The electrodes can also be fed by air to lengthen the plasma and improve its similarity to a gas flame. The high temperature of the plasma is then used to heat cookware and can also ignite flammable materials, similarly to a gas flame and thus these cooktops are also known as electric flame cooktops, and can be used with cookware that is not made of metal and thus incompatible with induction cooktops. The cooktop imitates the cooking characteristics of a gas cooktop without fossil fuels or gas lines.

These cooktops are different from those with "virtual flames" which are LED lights placed around an induction cooktop and do not generate heat themselves, since the heat is generated using induction.

== Ventilation and exhaust ==
Cooktops often have a kitchen hood installed overhead to expel or filter smoke, fumes and undesirable odors that result from cooking. However, when installation of an updraft ventilation system is undesirable or impossible (for example in an open kitchen design), a cooktop with an integrated downdraft ventilation system can be used instead. Such systems draw cooking fumes downwards rather than upwards, eliminating the need of an overhead installation. They are, however, less effective than overhead systems, and may not be able to extract fumes emanating from taller pots.

== Placement ==
=== Installed ===
Cooktops are virtually ubiquitous in kitchens. They may be built into a stove along with an oven. Alternatively, cooktops are often installed independently in work surfaces.

=== Hot plate ===
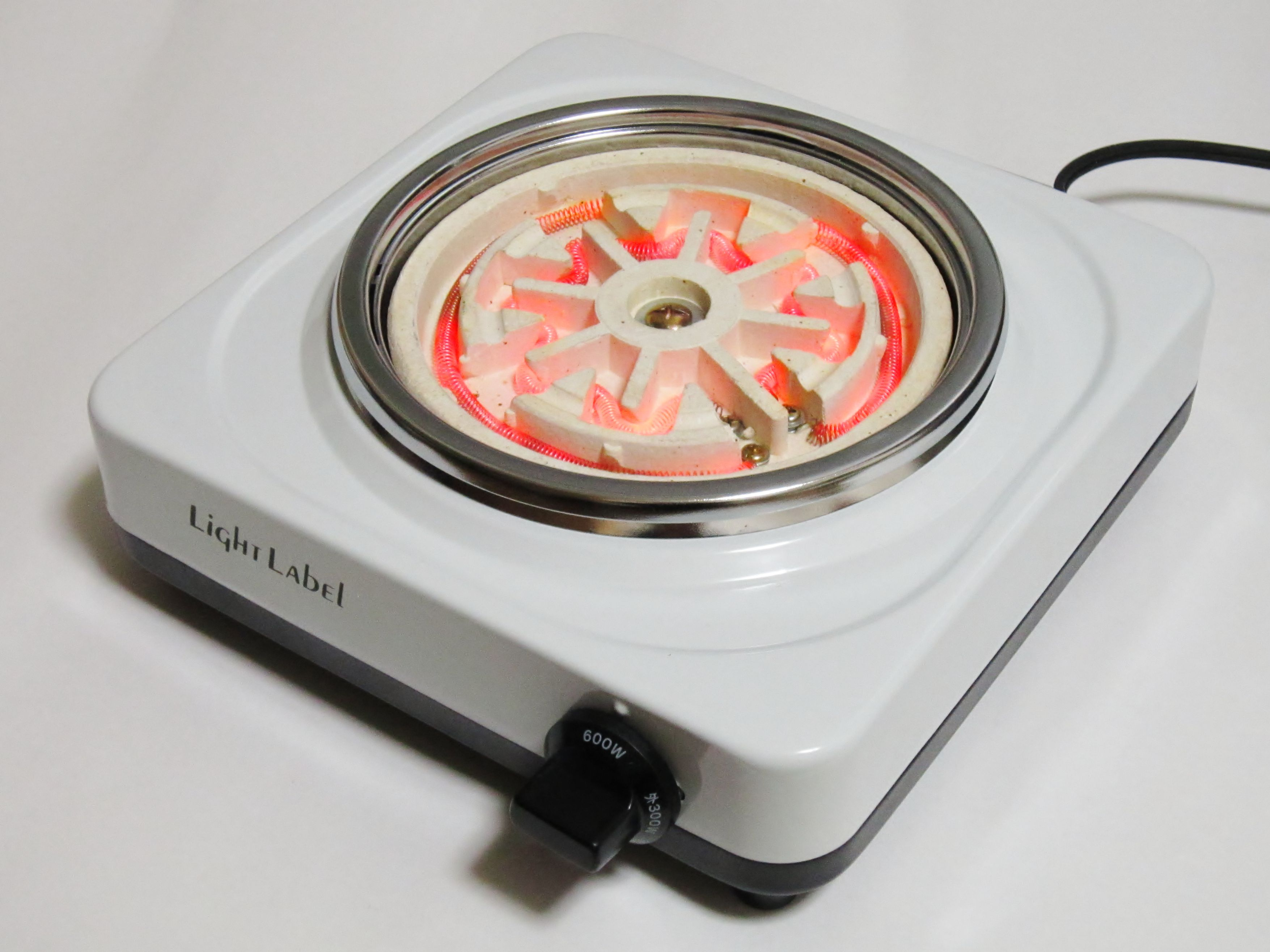
An electric tabletop burner

A hot plate or hotplate is a portable self-contained tabletop small appliance cooktop with one, two or more electric heating elements, or gas burners. A hot plate can be used as a standalone appliance, but is often used as a substitute for one of the burners from an oven range or a kitchen stove.

Hot plates are often used for food preparation, generally in locations where a full kitchen stove would not be convenient or practical. A hot plate can have a flat or round surface. Hot plates can be used for traveling or in areas without electricity.
