= Gas burner =

Device used to make fire from combusting fuel and oxidizer gases

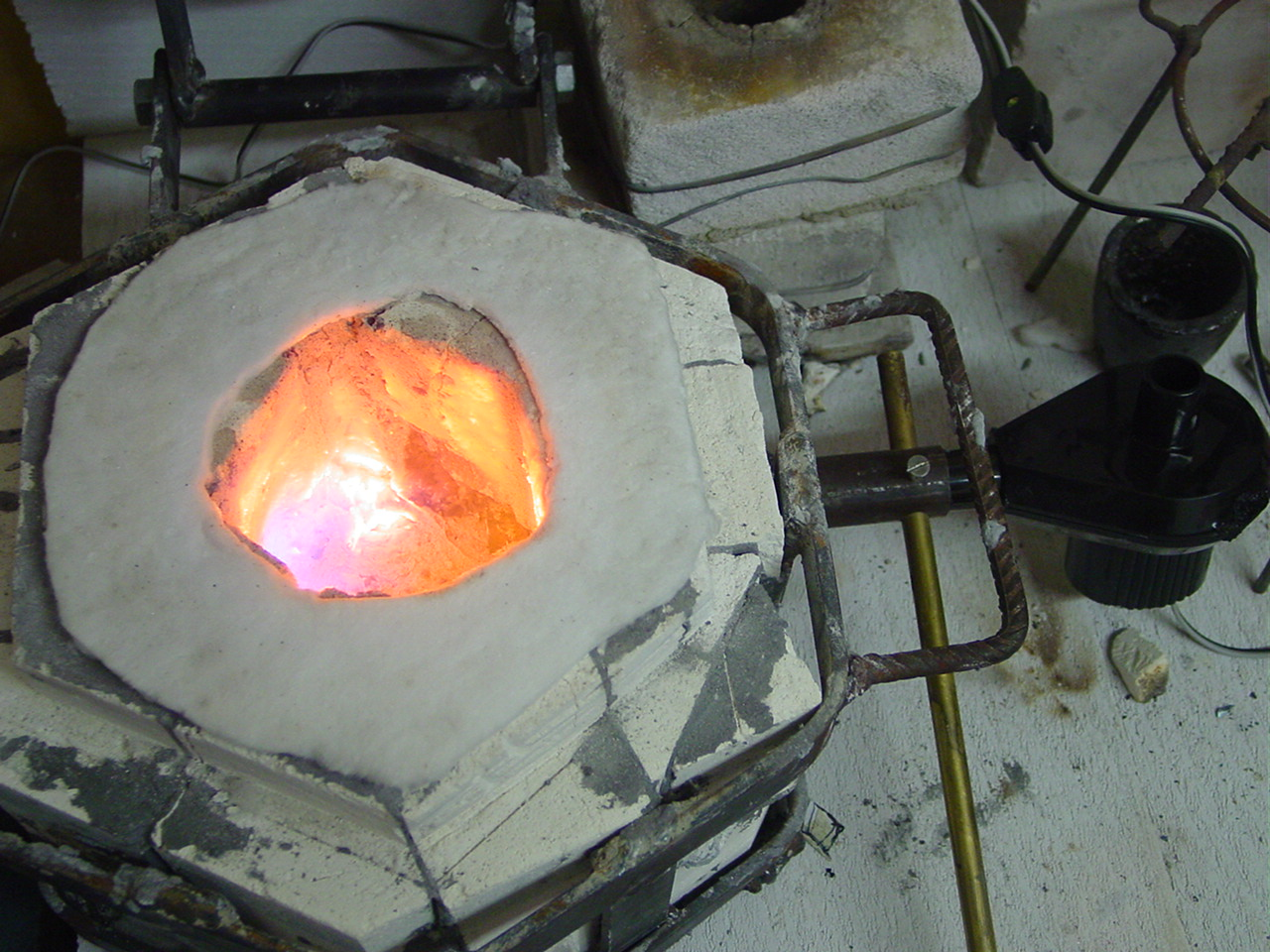
Propane burner used with forced air into a metal melting furnace.

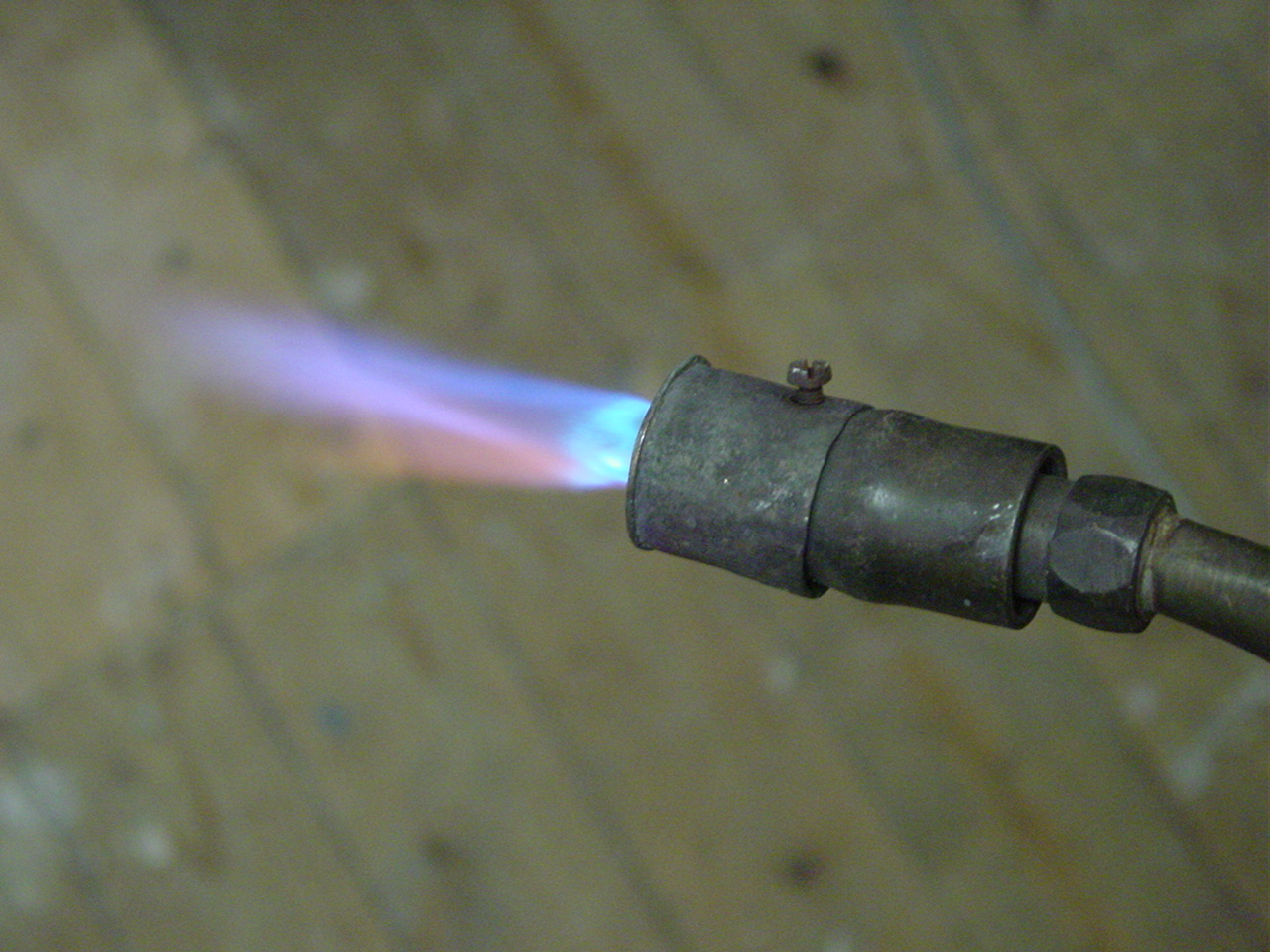
Propane burner with a Bunsen flame

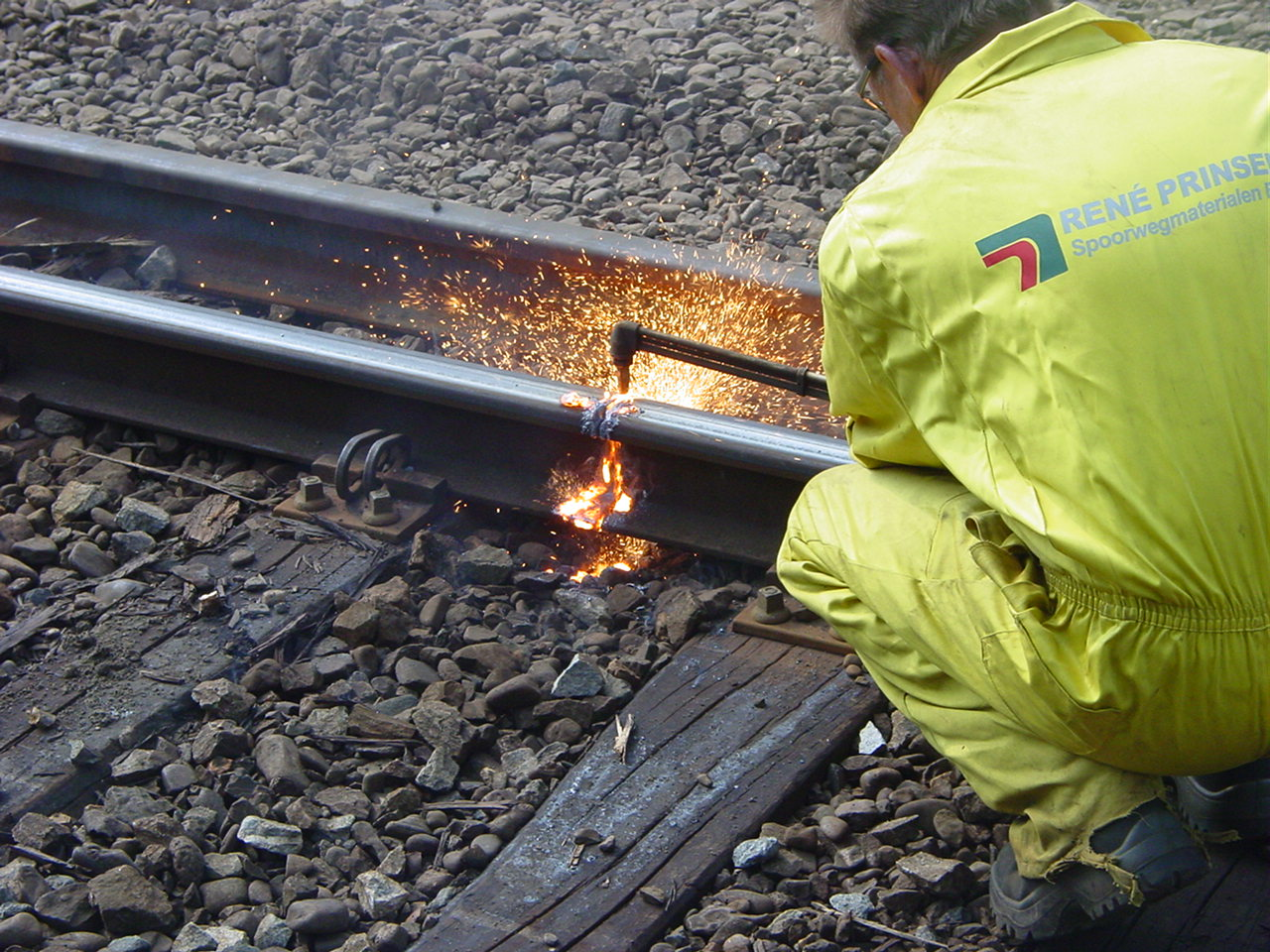
Oxy-Acetylene for cutting through steel rails

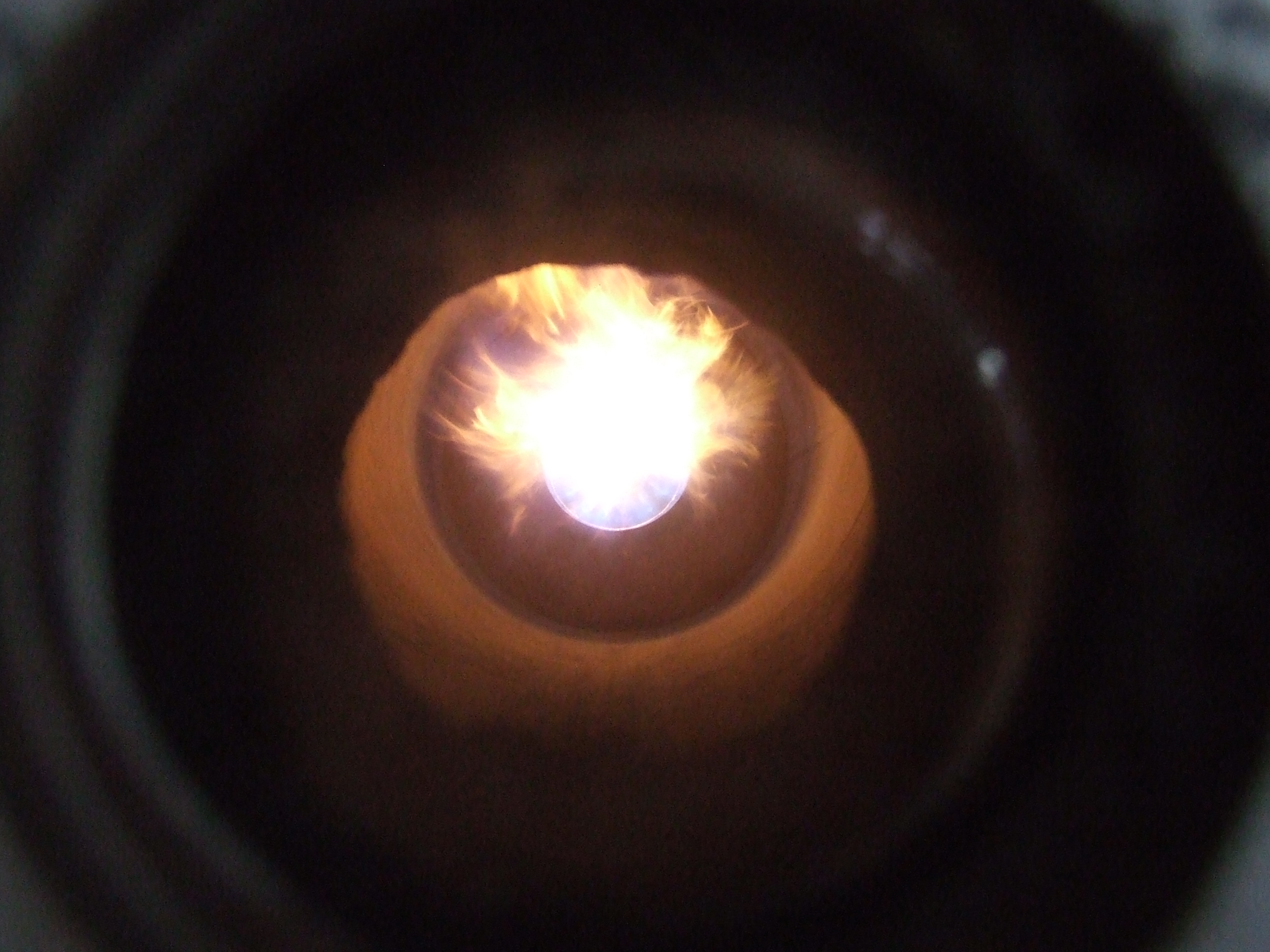
Flame of a gas and oil, in a dual burner

A gas burner is a device that produces a non-controlled flame by mixing a fuel gas such as acetylene, natural gas, or propane with an oxidizer such as the ambient air or supplied oxygen, and allowing for ignition and combustion.

The flame is generally used for the heat, infrared radiation, or visible light it produces. Some burners, such as gas flares, dispose of unwanted or uncontainable flammable gases. Some burners are operated to produce carbon black.

The gas burner has many applications such as soldering, brazing, and welding, the latter using oxygen instead of air for producing a hotter flame, which is required for melting steel. Chemistry laboratories use natural-gas fueled Bunsen burners. In domestic and commercial settings gas burners are commonly used in gas stoves and cooktops. For melting metals with melting points of up to 1100 °C (such as copper, silver, and gold), a propane burner with a natural drag of air can be used. For higher temperatures, acetylene is commonly used in combination with oxygen.

== Flame temperatures of common gases and fuels ==
Gas / Fuels	Flame temperature
Propane in air	1980 °C 3596 °F
Butane in air	1970 °C 3578 °F
Wood in air (normally not reached in a wood stove)	1980 °C 3596 °F
Acetylene in air	2550 °C 4622 °F
Methane (natural gas) in air	1950 °C 3542 °F
Hydrogen in air	2111 °C 3831 °F
Propane with oxygen	2800 °C 5072 °F
Acetylene in oxygen	3100 °C 5612 °F
Propane-butane mix with air	1970 °C 3578 °F
Coal in air (blast furnace)	1900 °C 3452 °F
Cyanogen (C_{2}N_{2}) in oxygen	4525 °C 8177 °F
Dicyanoacetylene (C_{4}N_{2}) in oxygen (highest flame temperature)	4982 °C 9000 °F

The above data is given with the following assumptions:

- The flame is adiabatic
- The surrounding air is at 20 °C, 1 bar (atm)
- Complete combustion (no soot, and more blue-like flame is the key) (Stoichiometric)
- Peak Temperature These notes are not assumptions, and need more clarification:
- Speed of Combustion (has no effect on temperature, but more energy released per second (as adiabatic) compared to normal flame)
- Spectral bands also affect colour of flame, as of what part and elements of combustion
- Blackbody radiation (colour appearance only because of heat)
- Atmosphere - affects temperature of flame and colour due to the atmospheric colour effect

== Flammability limits and ignition temperatures of common gases ==
	Flammability limit lower, in %	Flammability limit upper, in %	Ignition temperatures
Natural gas	4.7	15	482-632 °C
Propane	2.15	9.6	493-604 °C
Butane	1.9	8.5	482-538 °C
Acetylene	2.5	81	305 °C
Hydrogen	4	75	500 °C
Ammonia	16	25	651 °C
Carbon monoxide	12.5	74	609 °C
Ethylene	3.4	10.8	490 °C

(Atmosphere is air at 20 degrees Celsius.)

== Combustion values of common gases ==
Gas	Combustion value	
Gas	(Btu/ft³)	(MJ/m³)
Natural gas (methane)	950 to 1,150	35 to 43
Propane	2,572	95.8
Propane-butane mix	2,500 to 3,200	90 to 120
Butane	3,225	120.1
