= Smoke canopy =

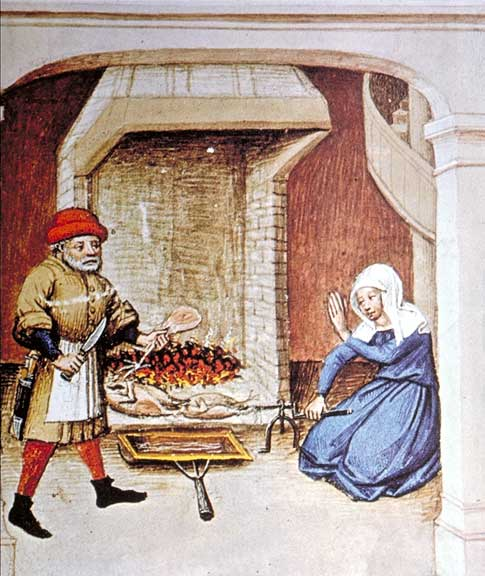
Fowl roasting on a spit. Smoke from the fire rises to the smoke canopy, and is vented through the wall or ceiling; The Decameron, Flanders, 1432.

A smoke canopy is a device hung over a fire to gather the smoke and vent it through a wall or roof.

Fireplaces were not used during much of the Middle Ages, because there were no chimneys, which were not invented and popularized until the 12th century. Most fires for heating were placed on hearths in the middles of rooms, and the smoke was allowed to rise to vents in the roof or high in walls. Smoke canopies provided an alternative, gathering the smoke above a fire and venting, usually through a wall clearing the living area from harmful chemicals.

Most pictures of medieval smoke canopies show them being used in kitchens. They usually appeared over hearths that were placed against stone walls. Some were over freestanding hearths, but this required special venting of the smoke.

Fire canopies are used to this day, especially in summer houses and mountain lodges as an alternative to expensive fireplaces.

== See also ==
- See Exhaust hood for modern stove hoods
