= Kitchen hood =

Type of home appliance that clears smoke from a stove

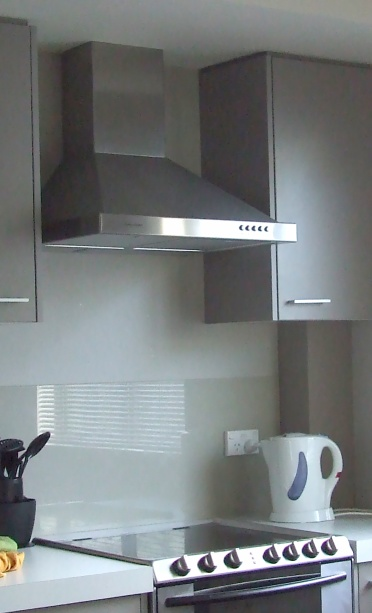
A kitchen hood in a small apartment

A kitchen hood, exhaust hood, hood fan, extractor hood, or range hood is a device containing a mechanical fan that hangs above the stove or cooktop in the kitchen. It removes airborne grease, combustion products, fumes, smoke, heat, and steam from the air by evacuation of the air and filtration.

In commercial kitchens exhaust hoods are often used in combination with fire suppression devices so that fumes from a grease fire are properly vented and the fire is put out quickly. Commercial vent hoods may also be combined with a fresh air fan that draws in exterior air, circulating it with the cooking fumes, which is then drawn out by the hood. In most exhaust hoods, a filtration system removes grease (the grease trap) and other particles. Although many vent hoods exhaust air to the outside, some recirculate the air to the kitchen. In a recirculating system, filters may be used to remove odors in addition to the grease.

== Names ==
The device is known as an extractor hood in the United Kingdom, as a range hood in the United States, and as a rangehood in Australia. It is also called a stove hood, hood fan, cooker hood, vent hood, or ventilation hood. Other names include cooking canopy, extractor fan, fume extractor, and electric chimney.

== Description ==
An extractor hood consists of three main components: a skirt or capture panel to contain the rising gases (also known as the "effluent plume"), a grease filter, and a fan for ventilation. Extractor hoods may be ducted (or vented) or ductless (or recirculating). Ducted hoods blow the gases to the outdoors; ductless hoods filter the air, often using activated charcoal, to remove odor and smoke particles from the air and then release the cleaned air back into the kitchen. Larger hood overhangs are recommended to help contain cooking fires within the area protected by the fire suppression system.

Exhaust hoods almost always include built-in lighting to illuminate the cooking surface. Extractor hood controls are typically electronic, though some low-end models use electromechanical controls. Extractor hoods with electronic controls can offer remote control, motorized height adjustment, thermal sensor, overheat protection, boost mode, delayed shut-off, filter cleaning reminder, active noise cancellation, temperature display, user presets (memory), and so on. Extractor hoods may be made from a variety of materials, including stainless steel, copper, bronze, nickel silver, zinc, tempered glass, wood, aluminum, brass, heat-resistant plastics, and more. NFPA 96 Standard for Ventilation Control and Fire Protection of Commercial Cooking says that mesh filters shall not be used. It requires that "Listed" grease filters shall be tested in accordance with UL 1046, Standard for Grease Filters for Exhaust Ducts.

Hood air flow is measured in liters per second (L/s), cubic meters per second (m^{3}/s), or cubic feet per minute (cfm). Energy efficiency is evaluated based on the power consumption relative to airflow output, encouraging the use of energy-efficient DC (direct current) motors and electronically commutated motors (ECMs) in modern range hoods.

== Types ==
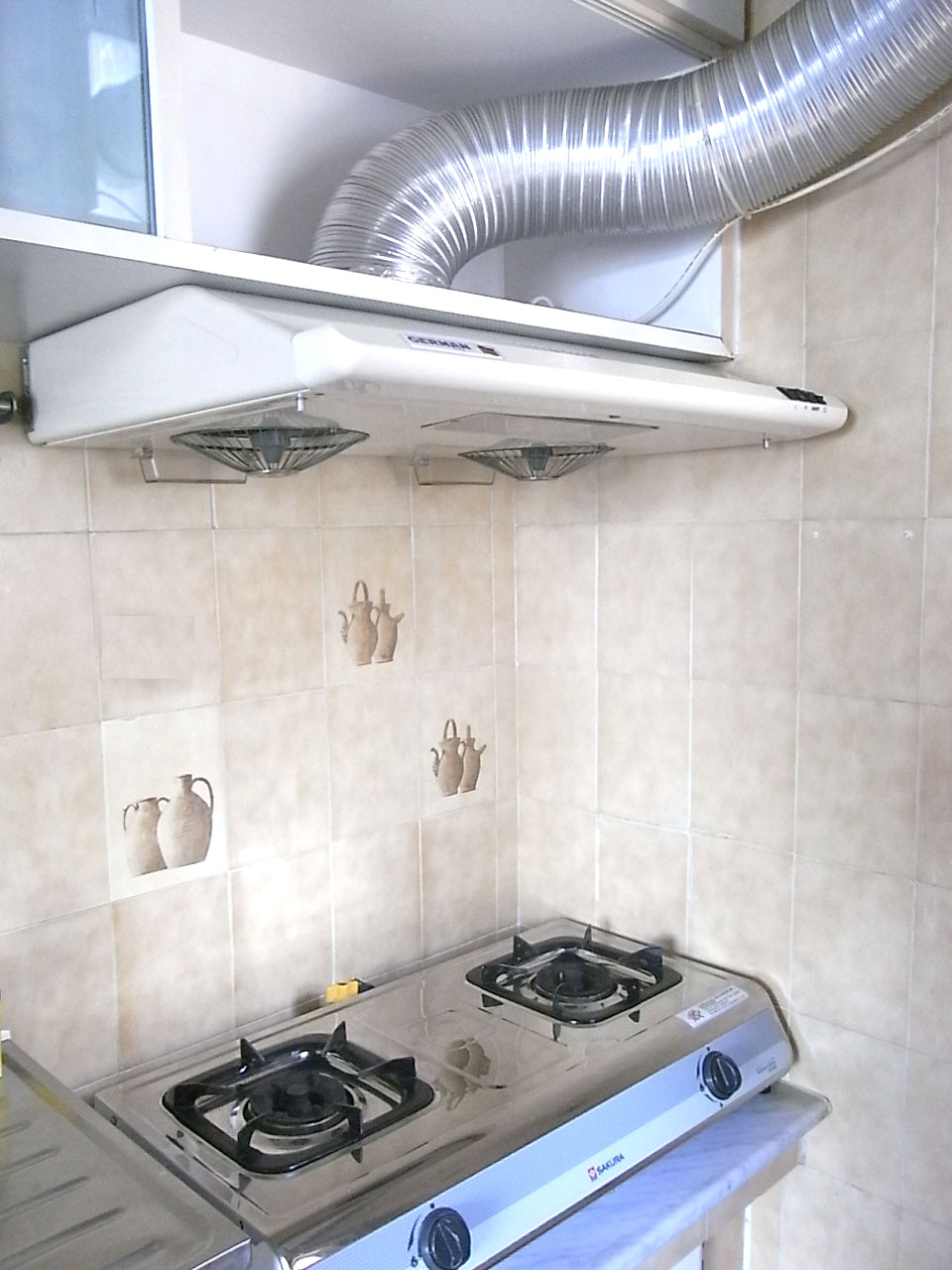
A kitchen hood with a duct

Kitchen hoods are broadly classified into ducted hoods and ductless hoods. This classification of kitchen hoods is based purely on how the hoods process the incoming air. Range hoods are kitchen ventilation systems designed to remove smoke, steam, heat, grease, and cooking fumes through ducted or recirculating exhaust systems. Common types include wall-mounted, ceiling-mounted, roof-mounted, and downdraft range hoods, each differing in installation method, ventilation design, and suitability for particular kitchen layouts.

A ducted system removes all forms of airborne contamination, whereas a ductless one recirculates heat and moisture. In addition, a ducted application eliminates the need for regular replacement of the filters and avoids the airflow restriction (and the resultant loss of power) caused by them. However, the ducted application can be impractical, due to lack of space or ability to install a duct system, make-up air requirements, or the additional cost of heating or cooling the make-up air.

=== Ducted kitchen hoods ===
Ducted kitchen hoods are the most common and a primary type of kitchen hood. As the name suggests, a ducted kitchen hood has a duct that is used to process and expel any smoke that is generated on top of the kitchen hob. Large sized duct hoods are widely used not just in homes but also in commercial restaurants and communal kitchens too. Wall-mounted systems are among the most common and affordable options and are typically suited to kitchens where the cooktop is positioned against a wall, while ceiling-mounted and roof-mounted systems are more commonly associated with modern or high-end kitchen designs. Downdraft systems vent air downward from the cooktop area rather than upward. Factors influencing suitability include ventilation access, kitchen structure, cost, and cooking requirements.

Although range hoods may vent through an external wall, roof venting is generally considered more effective, particularly in modern homes. Roof venting typically allows for shorter and straighter ducting, improving airflow efficiency, reducing operating noise and grease buildup, and providing improved performance for high-powered range hoods. It also avoids visible exterior wall vents and allows hot, moisture-laden air to rise and exit more efficiently from the building.

=== Ductless kitchen hoods ===
Ductless kitchen hoods do not have a duct that is used to process the air. Instead, it makes use of strong air filtration and then pumps out the air back into the room. These types of range hoods are usually used in houses. Many homes use recirculating range hoods, which filter air and return it to the kitchen rather than venting it outside. While effective at reducing some odours and airborne particles, they do not fully remove steam, moisture, grease, smoke, or lingering cooking odours, which over time may contribute to mould growth and damage to paint, cabinetry, and ceilings.

== Filters ==
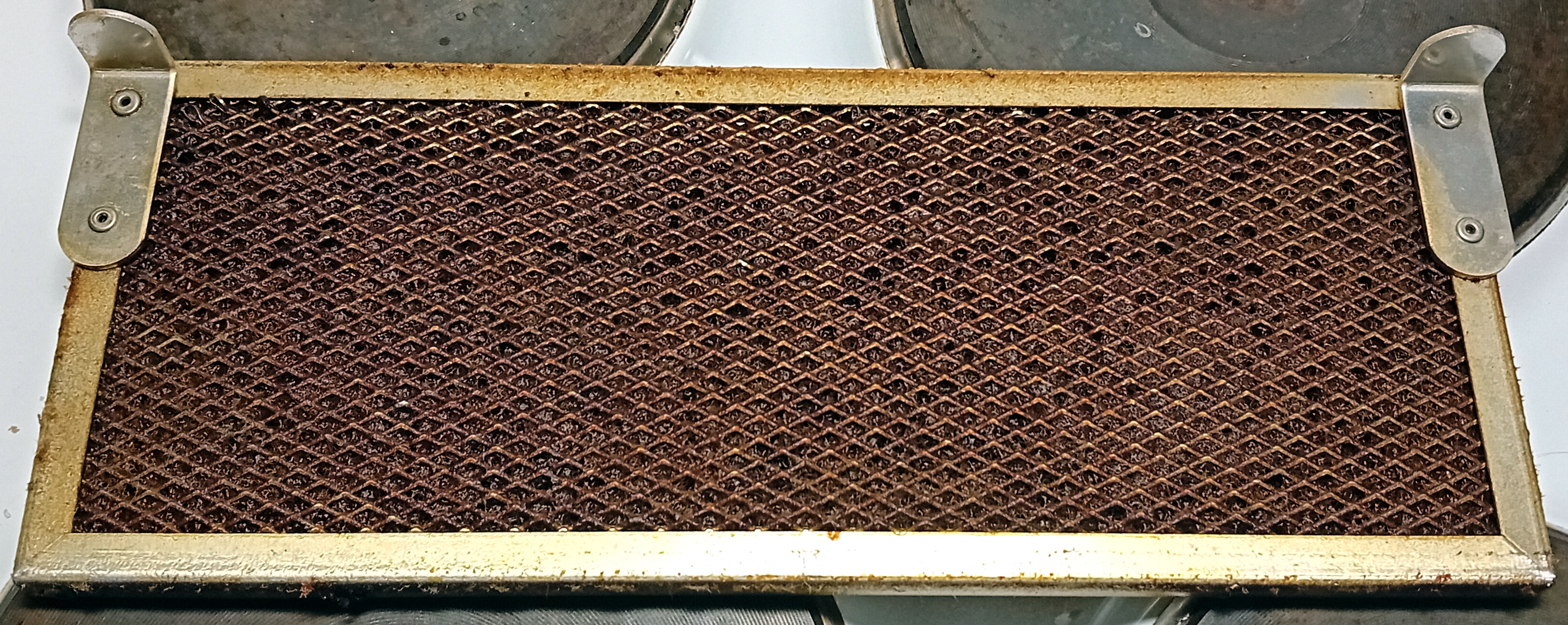
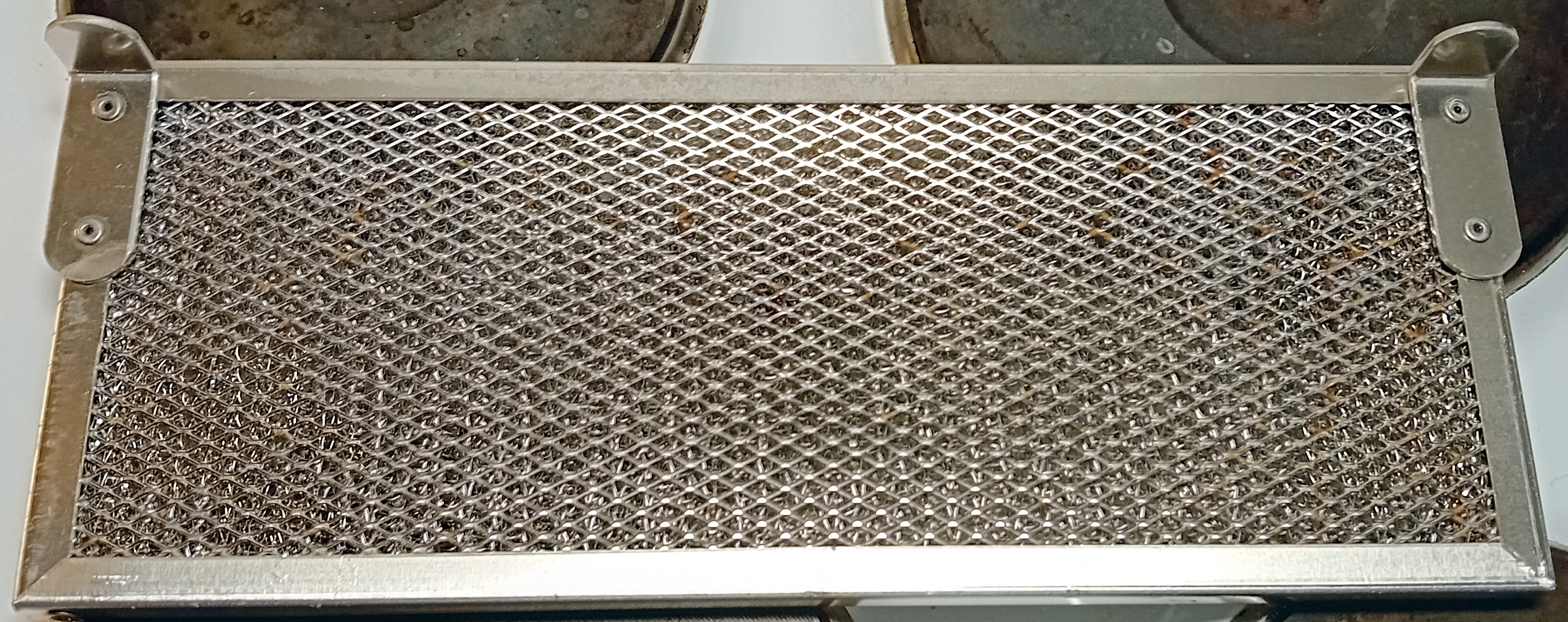
A very dirty mesh filter (top) and the same filter after being cleaned in a dishwasher

Filters remove most odors and particulates, including grease, from the vented air. There are three main types of filter:

- Mesh or cassette filters are made from aluminium mesh strips placed one over the other. They are highly effective at capturing and removing oil and grease from the smoke in both ducted and ductless chimneys. They must be cleaned regularly.
- Baffle filters are made of steel/aluminium frames with curved panels. The curves catch on grease, oil and other particulates. They are durable and easy to clean and are used in both ducted and ductless chimneys. They must be cleaned regularly.
- Charcoal filters are made of fine powdered activated charcoal. They are primarily used for ductless applications. They cannot be cleaned, but need to be replaced regularly.

== Noise levels ==
Loud kitchen hoods can affect well-being, and may even contribute to hearing loss. Variable speed fans are generally noisier at higher speeds and different models may have different noise levels. Vented hoods are generally noisier but more effective than recirculating hoods.

Noise levels are measured on dB(A) scale or in sones (in the U.S.). Most kitchen hoods produce 60-70 dB(A), while "quiet" models can go as low as 40 dB(A).

Noise levels are generally given for the maximum speed, so it may be useful to compare noise levels at specific flow rates.

The European Union standardizes the measurement of hood noise.

== See also ==
- Fume hood
- Kitchen ventilation
- Smoke canopy
