= List of diplomatic missions of the United Kingdom =

Diplomatic missions of the United Kingdom

This is a list of diplomatic missions of the United Kingdom of Great Britain and Northern Ireland, excluding honorary consulates. The UK has one of the largest global networks of diplomatic missions. UK diplomatic missions to capitals of other Commonwealth of Nations member countries are known as High Commissions (headed by 'High Commissioners'). For three Commonwealth countries (namely India, Nigeria, and Pakistan), the Foreign, Commonwealth and Development Office (FCDO) still uses the term "Deputy High Commission" for Consulates-General (headed by Deputy High Commissioners), although this terminology is being phased out. British citizens may get help from the embassy of any other Commonwealth country present, when in a country where there is no British embassy, including New Zealand and Australia, to help British nationals in some countries.

The Foreign, Commonwealth and Development Office employs approximately 13,200 staff in the UK and in more than 260 Posts overseas. Approximately one-third of these employees are UK-based civil servants (including members of HM Diplomatic Service) and two-thirds are employed locally by Posts overseas.

== Contemporary history ==
In 2004, the FCDO carried out a review of the deployment of its diplomatic missions, and subsequently over a two-year period closed its missions in Nassau (in the Bahamas), Asunción (Paraguay), Dili (East Timor), Maseru (Lesotho), Mbabane (Swaziland), Antananarivo (Madagascar), Nuku'alofa (Tonga), Tarawa (Kiribati), and Port Vila (Vanuatu). Additionally several consulates and trade offices were also closed, including those in Fukuoka (Japan), Vientiane (Laos), Douala (Cameroon), Porto (Portugal), along with Frankfurt, Leipzig, and Stuttgart in Germany, and Phoenix, San Juan, and Dallas in the United States. Other consulates in Australia, Germany, France, Spain, New Zealand, and the US were downgraded and staffed by local personnel only. In 2012, Foreign Secretary William Hague announced the opening of embassies in Liberia and Haiti, the re-opening of embassies in Laos, El Salvador, and Paraguay, and the opening of a Consulate-General in Recife (Brazil). He also said that by 2015, the UK would have opened up to eleven new embassies and eight new Consulates or Trade Offices. In 2013, a UK government office was established in Seattle. In 2014, all services at the former UK Consulate in Orlando were transferred to the nearby UK Consulate-General in Miami. In 2015, the UK Consulate-General in Denver was reclassified as a UK Government Office. In 2018 the Foreign, Commonwealth and Development Office has announced that new High Commissions will open in Antigua and Barbuda, Bahamas, Grenada, Lesotho, Saint Vincent and the Grenadines, Samoa, Swaziland, Tonga and Vanuatu and a British office in Somaliland like the one in Taipei, Taiwan

== Current Missions ==
=== Africa ===
| Host country | Host city | Mission | Concurrent accreditation | Ref. |
|---|---|---|---|---|
| Algeria | Algiers | Embassy | | |
| Angola | Luanda | Embassy | Country: São Tomé and Príncipe | |
| Botswana | Gaborone | High Commission | | |
| Burundi | Bujumbura | Embassy office | | |
| Cameroon | Yaoundé | High Commission | Countries: Equatorial Guinea; Gabon | |
| Chad | N'Djamena | Embassy | | |
| Congo-Kinshasa | Kinshasa | Embassy | Countries: Central African Republic; Congo-Brazzaville | |
| Djibouti | Djibouti City | Embassy | | |
| Egypt | Cairo | Embassy | | |
| Egypt | Alexandria | Consulate-General | | |
| Eritrea | Asmara | Embassy | | |
| Eswatini | Mbabane | High Commission | | |
| Ethiopia | Addis Ababa | Embassy | International Organization: African Union | |
| Gambia | Banjul | High Commission | | |
| Ghana | Accra | High Commission | Countries: Burkina Faso; Togo | |
| Guinea | Conakry | Embassy | | |
| Ivory Coast | Abidjan | Embassy | | |
| Kenya | Nairobi | High Commission | International Organizations: United Nations; United Nations Environment Programme; United Nations Human Settlements Programme | |
| Lesotho | Maseru | High Commission | | |
| Liberia | Monrovia | Embassy | | |
| Libya | Tripoli | Embassy | | |
| Madagascar | Antananarivo | Embassy | Country: Comoros | |
| Malawi | Lilongwe | High Commission | | |
| Mali | Bamako | Embassy | | |
| Mauritania | Nouakchott | Embassy | | |
| Mauritius | Port Louis | High Commission | | |
| Morocco | Rabat | Embassy | | |
| Morocco | Casablanca | Consulate-General | | |
| Mozambique | Maputo | High Commission | | |
| Namibia | Windhoek | High Commission | | |
| Niger | Niamey | Embassy | | |
| Nigeria | Abuja | High Commission | | |
| Nigeria | Lagos | Deputy High Commission | | |
| Nigeria | Port Harcourt | Liaison office | | |
| Rwanda | Kigali | High Commission | | |
| Senegal | Dakar | Embassy | Country: Guinea-Bissau | |
| Seychelles | Victoria | High Commission | | |
| Sierra Leone | Freetown | High Commission | | |
| Somalia | Mogadishu | Embassy | | |
| Somalia | Hargeisa | British office | | |
| South Africa | Pretoria | High Commission | | |
| South Africa | Cape Town | Consulate-General | | |
| South Sudan | Juba | Embassy | | |
| Tanzania | Dar es Salaam | High Commission | | |
| Tanzania | Dodoma | High Commission Office | | |
| Tunisia | Tunis | Embassy | | |
| Uganda | Kampala | High Commission | | |
| Zambia | Lusaka | High Commission | | |
| Zimbabwe | Harare | Embassy | | |

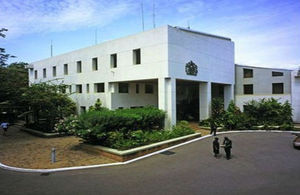
High Commission in Accra

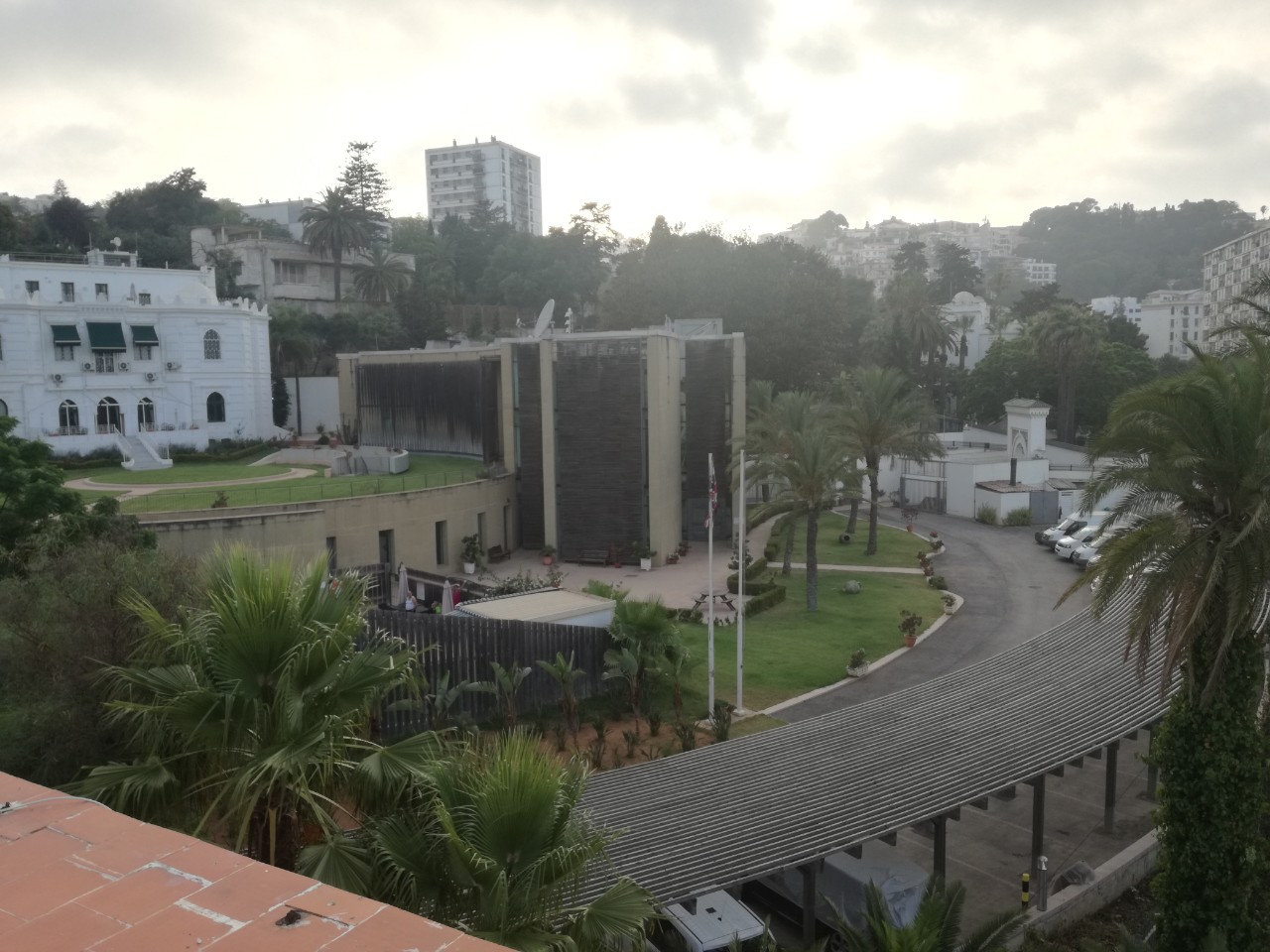
Embassy in Algiers

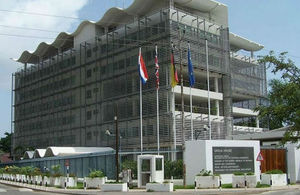
High Commission in Dar es Salaam

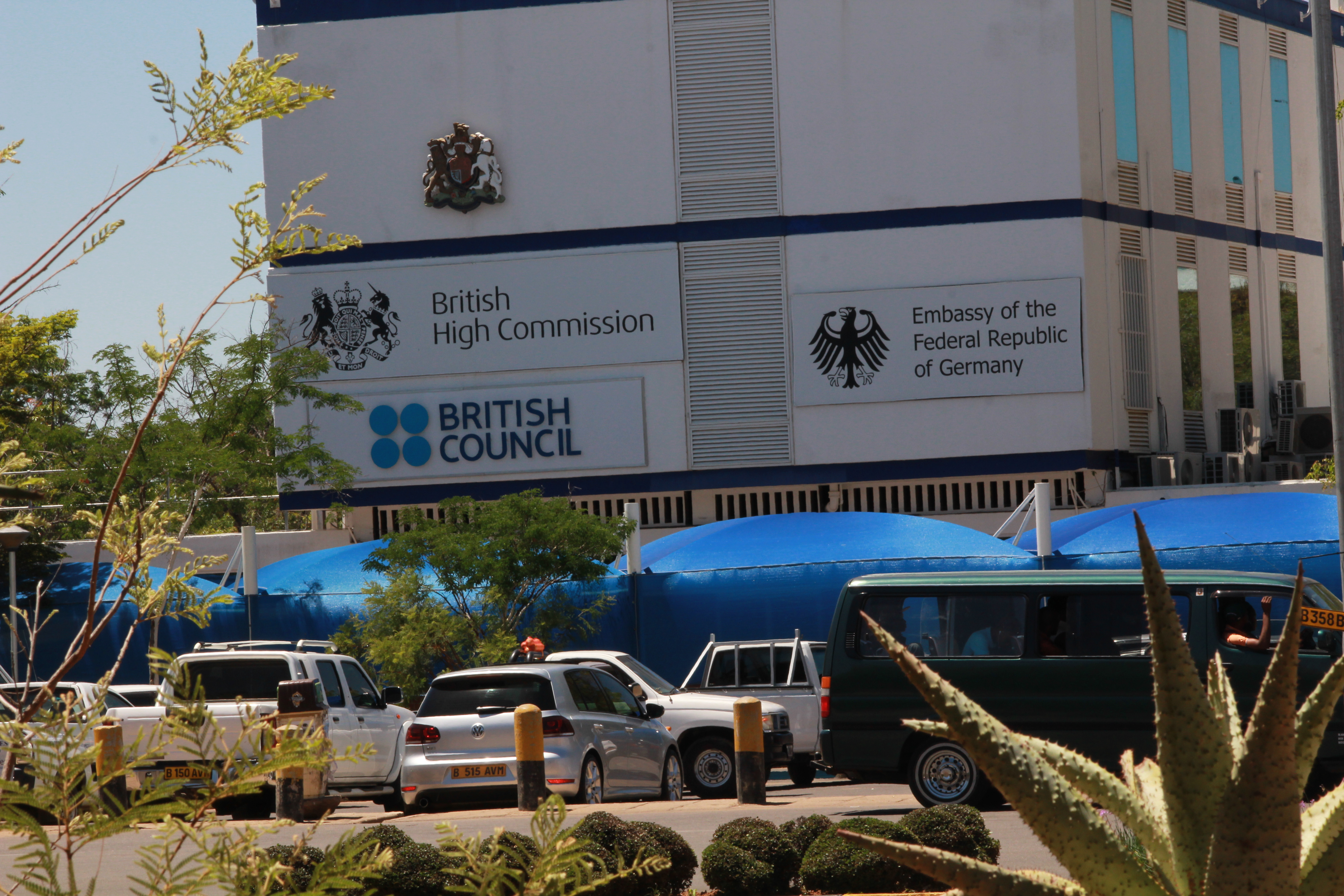
High Commission in Gaborone

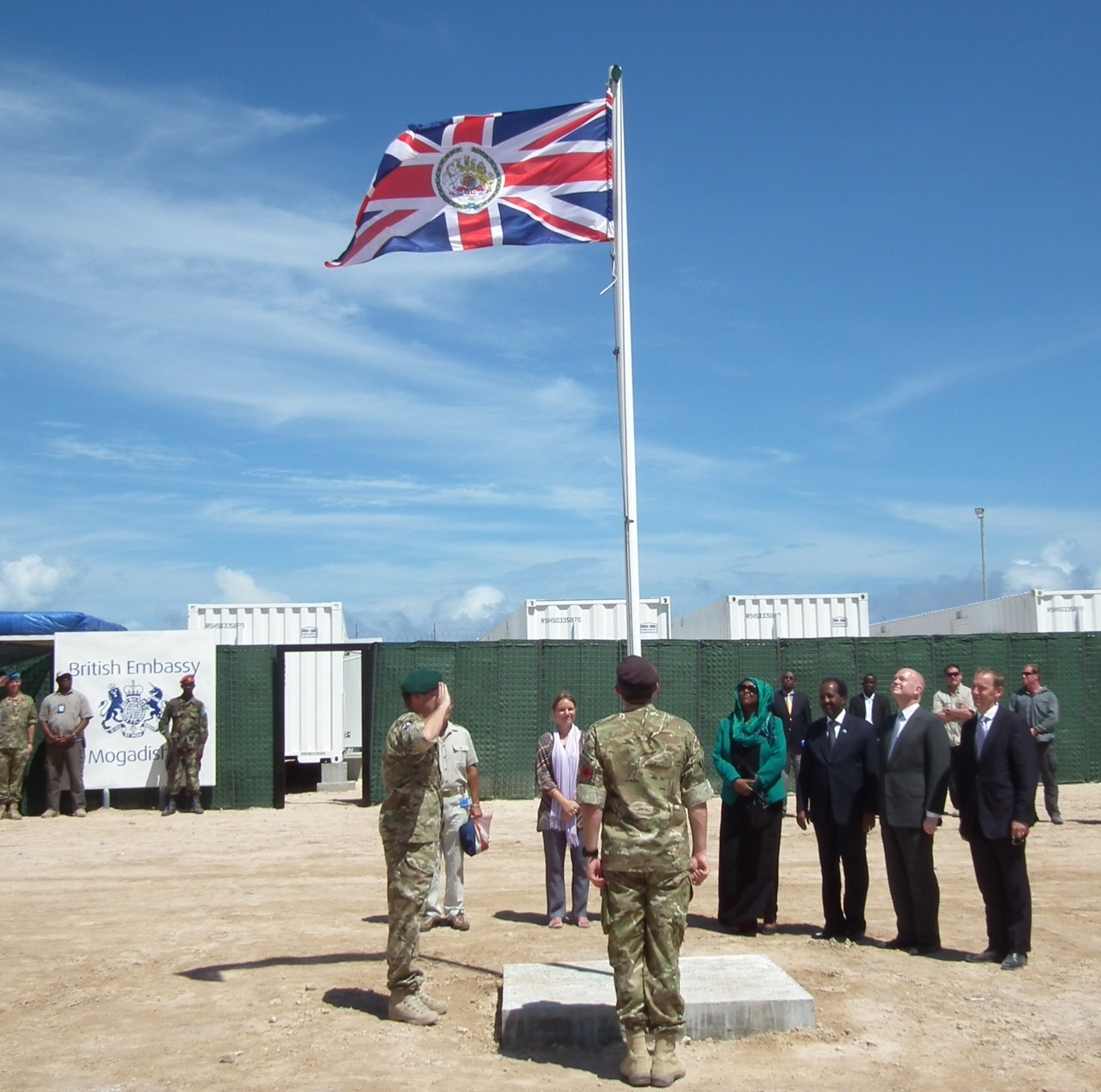
Embassy in Mogadishu

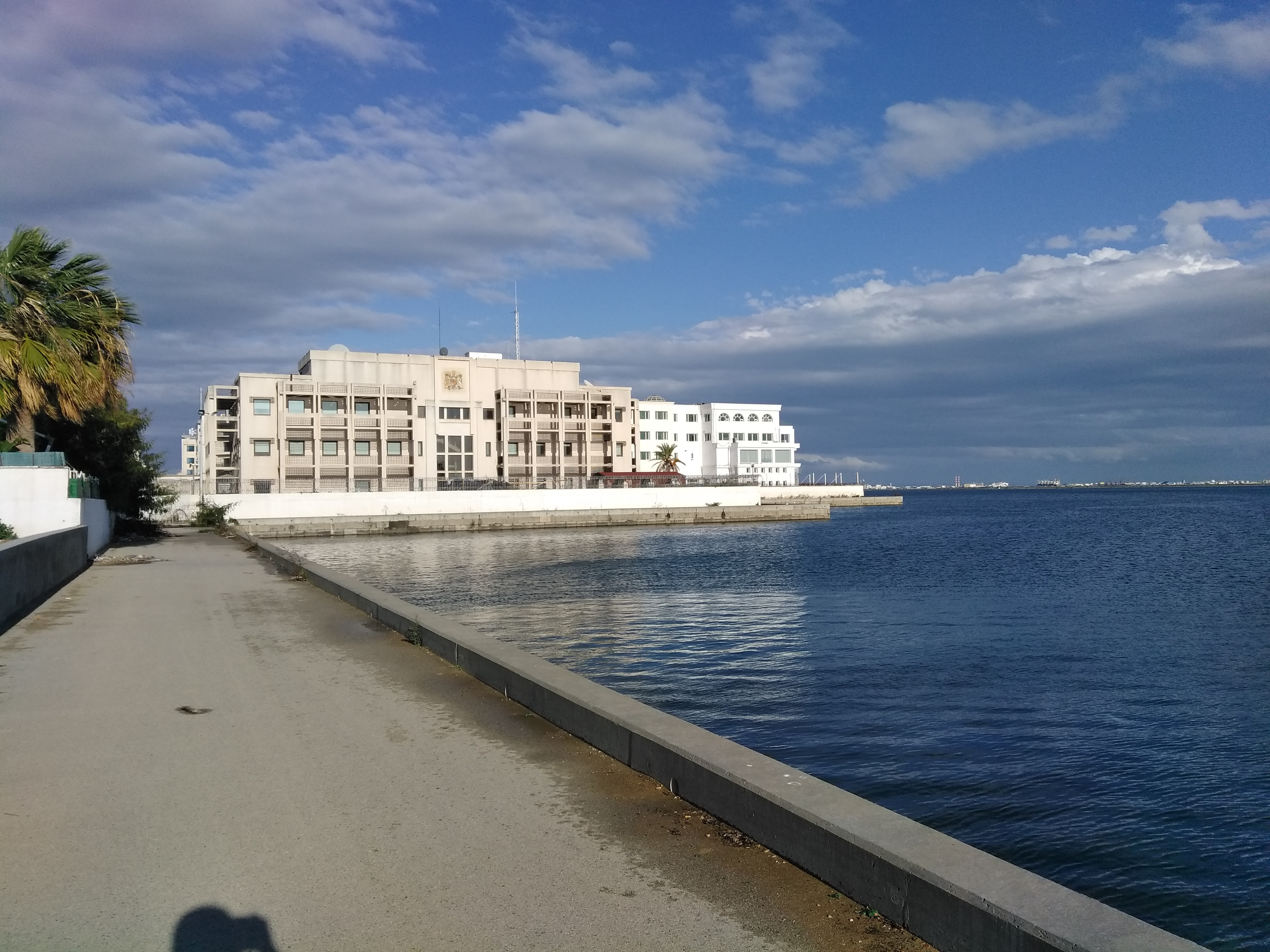
Embassy in Tunis

=== Americas ===
| Host country | Host city | Mission | Concurrent accreditation | Ref. |
|---|---|---|---|---|
| Antigua and Barbuda | St. John's | High Commission | | |
| Argentina | Buenos Aires | Embassy | | |
| Bahamas | Nassau | High Commission | | |
| Barbados | Bridgetown | High Commission | Countries: Dominica; Saint Kitts and Nevis | |
| Belize | Belmopan | High Commission | | |
| Bolivia | La Paz | Embassy | | |
| Brazil | Brasília | Embassy | | |
| Brazil | Belo Horizonte | Consulate-General | | |
| Brazil | Recife | Consulate-General | | |
| Brazil | Rio de Janeiro | Consulate-General | | |
| Brazil | São Paulo | Consulate-General | | |
| Canada | Ottawa | High Commission | | |
| Canada | Calgary | Consulate-General | | |
| Canada | Montreal | Consulate-General | | |
| Canada | Toronto | Consulate-General | | |
| Canada | Vancouver | Consulate-General | | |
| Chile | Santiago de Chile | Embassy | | |
| Colombia | Bogotá | Embassy | | |
| Costa Rica | San José | Embassy | Country: Nicaragua | |
| Cuba | Havana | Embassy | | |
| Dominican Republic | Santo Domingo | Embassy | | |
| Ecuador | Quito | Embassy | | |
| El Salvador | San Salvador | Embassy | | |
| Guatemala | Guatemala City | Embassy | Country: Honduras | |
| Grenada | St. George's | High Commission | | |
| Guyana | Georgetown | High Commission | Country: Suriname | |
| Haiti | Port-au-Prince | Embassy | | |
| Jamaica | Kingston | High Commission | | |
| Mexico | Mexico City | Embassy | | |
| Mexico | Cancún | Consulate-General | | |
| Panama | Panama City | Embassy | | |
| Paraguay | Asunción | Embassy | | |
| Peru | Lima | Embassy | | |
| Saint Lucia | Castries | High Commission | | |
| Saint Vincent and the Grenadines | Kingstown | High Commission | | |
| Trinidad and Tobago | Port of Spain | High Commission | | |
| United States | Washington, D.C. | Embassy | International Organization: IMF; World Bank | |
| United States | Atlanta | Consulate-General | International Organization: IMF; World Bank | |
| United States | Boston | Consulate-General | International Organization: IMF; World Bank | |
| United States | Chicago | Consulate-General | International Organization: IMF; World Bank | |
| United States | Houston | Consulate-General | International Organization: IMF; World Bank | |
| United States | Los Angeles | Consulate General | International Organization: IMF; World Bank | |
| United States | Miami | Consulate-General | International Organization: IMF; World Bank | |
| United States | New York City | Consulate-General | International Organization: IMF; World Bank | |
| United States | San Francisco | Consulate-General | International Organization: IMF; World Bank | |
| Uruguay | Montevideo | Embassy | | |
| Venezuela | Caracas | Embassy | | |

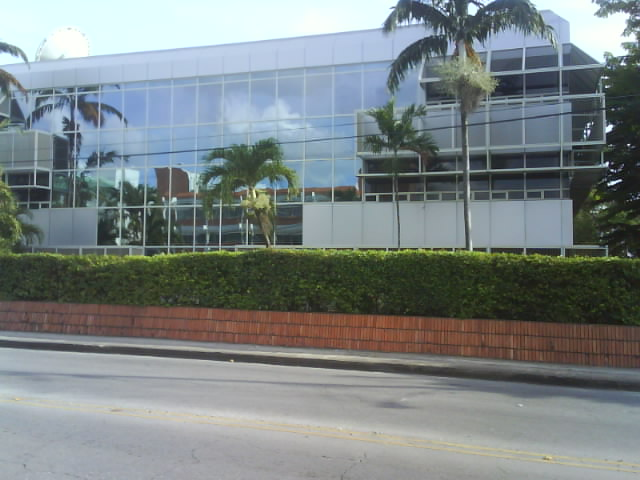
High Commission in Bridgetown

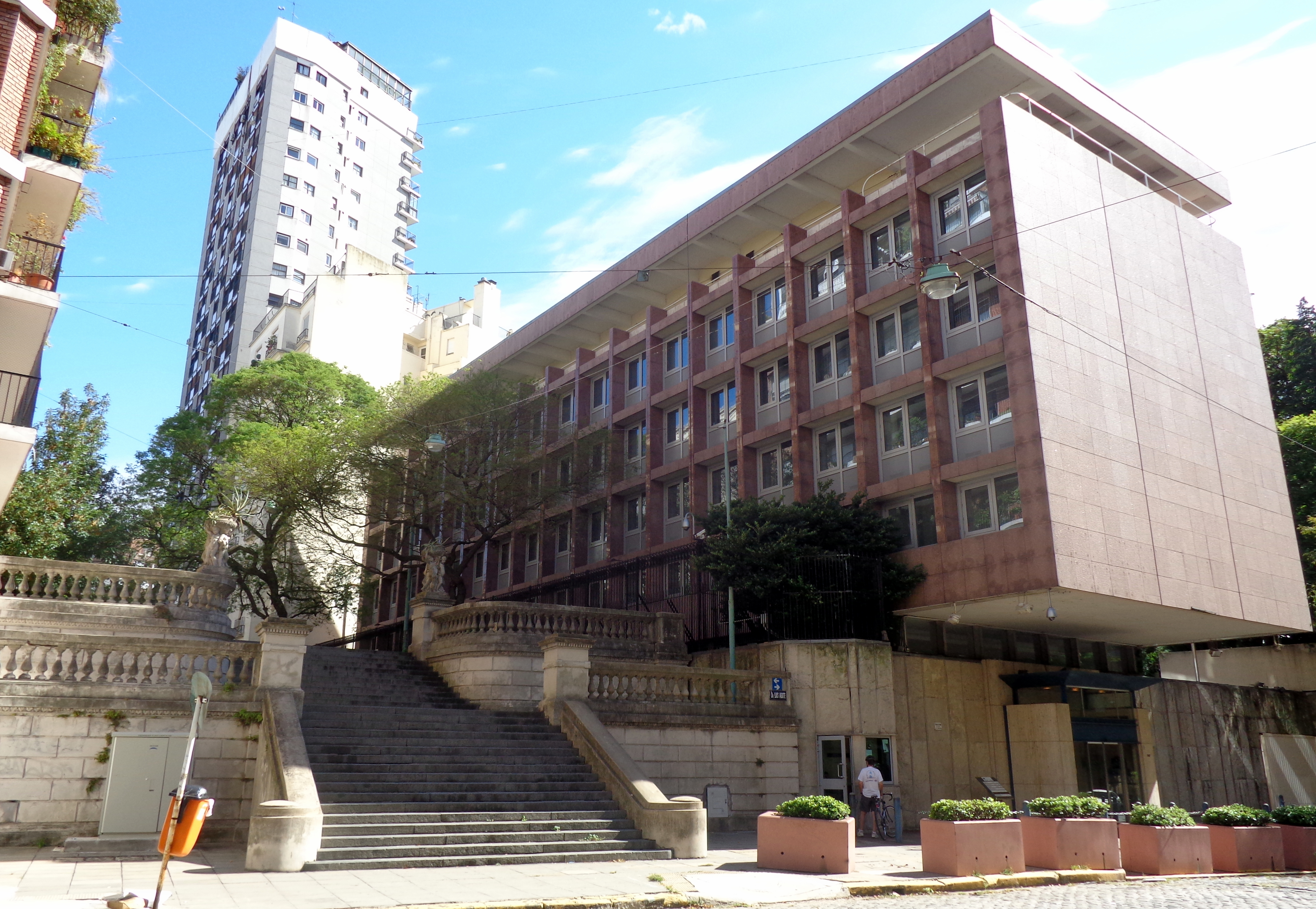
Embassy in Buenos Aires

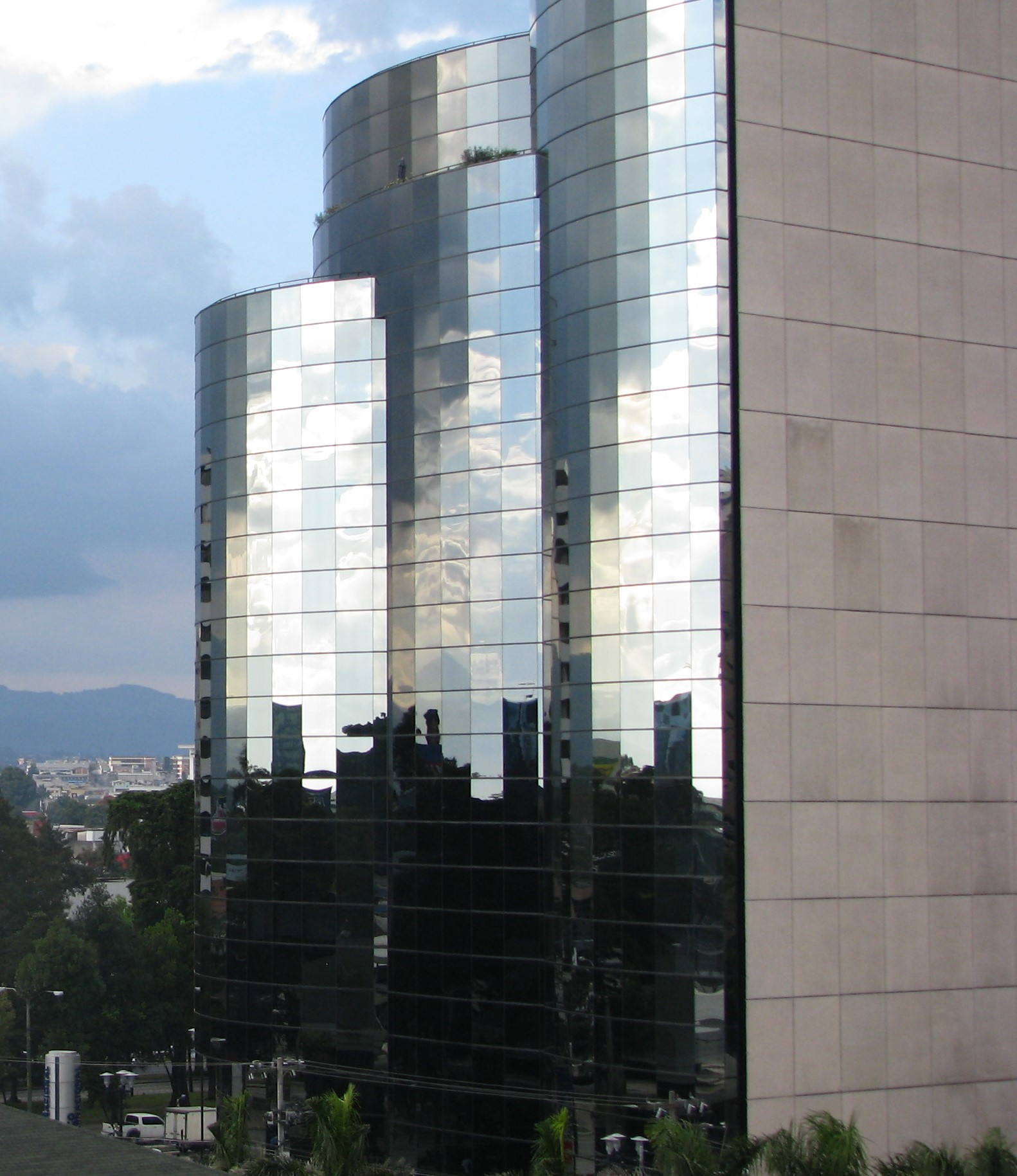
Building hosting the Embassy in Guatemala City

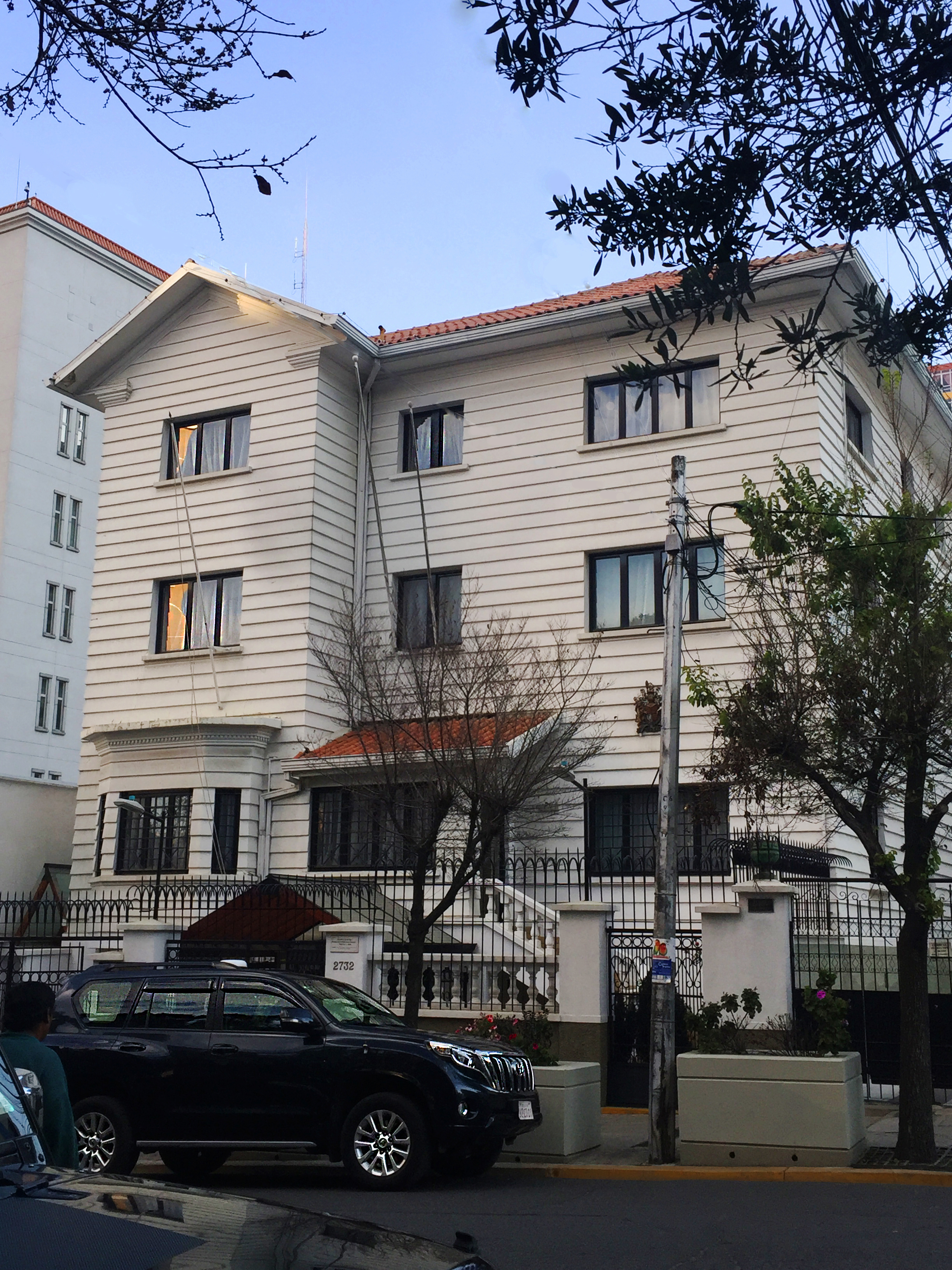
Embassy in La Paz

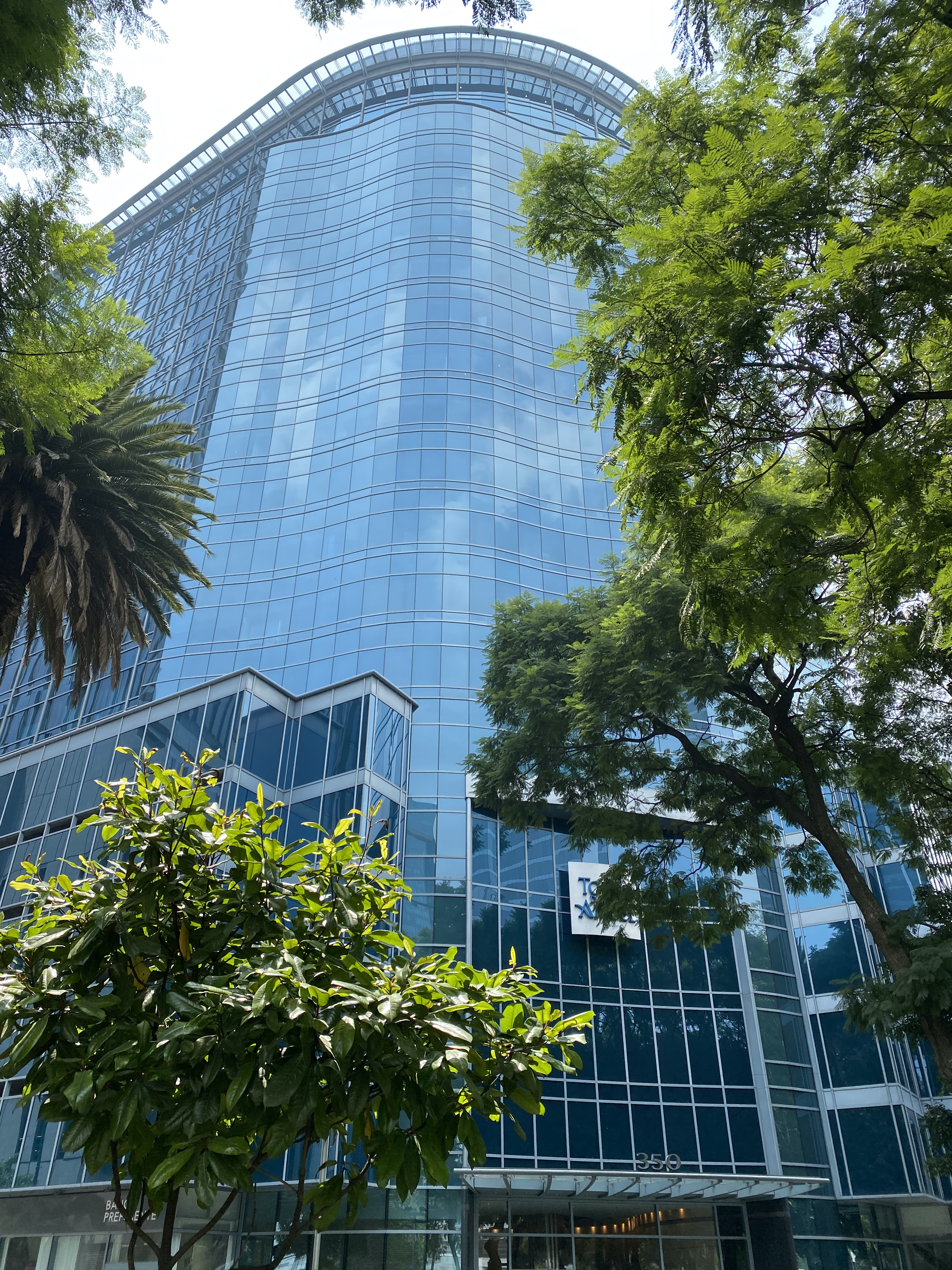
Building hosting the Embassy in Mexico City

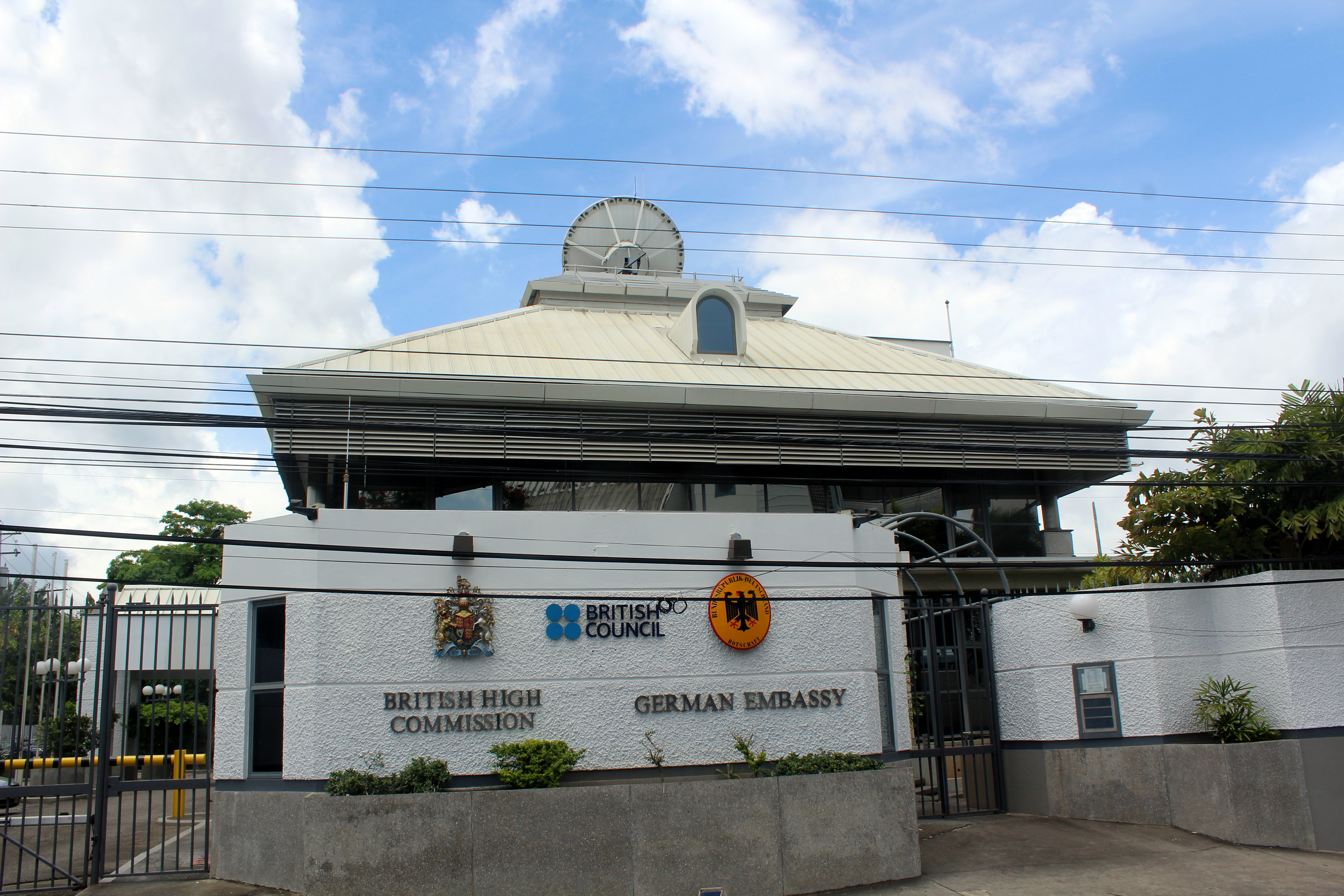
High Commission in Port of Spain

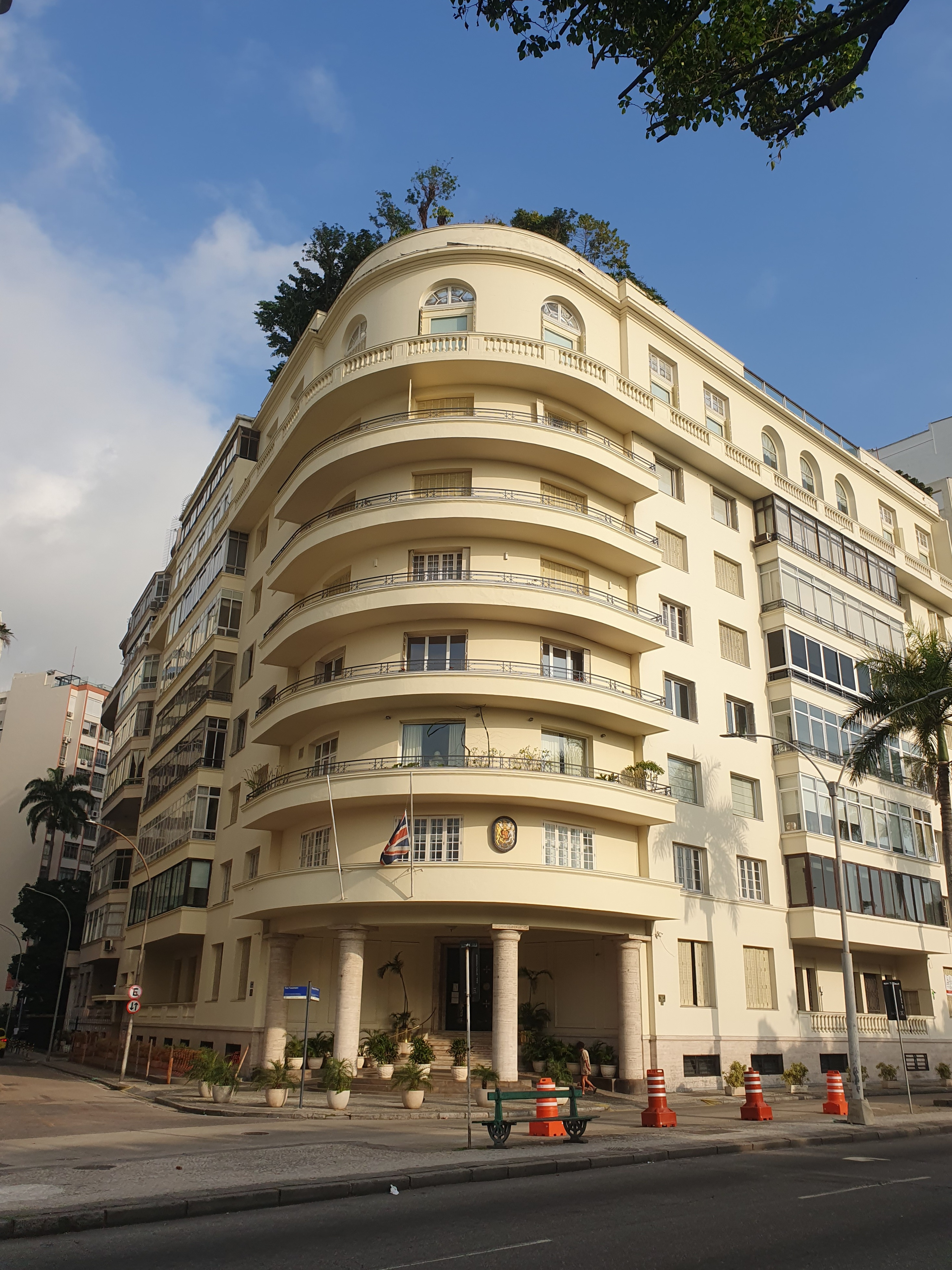
Building hosting the Consulate-General in Rio de Janeiro

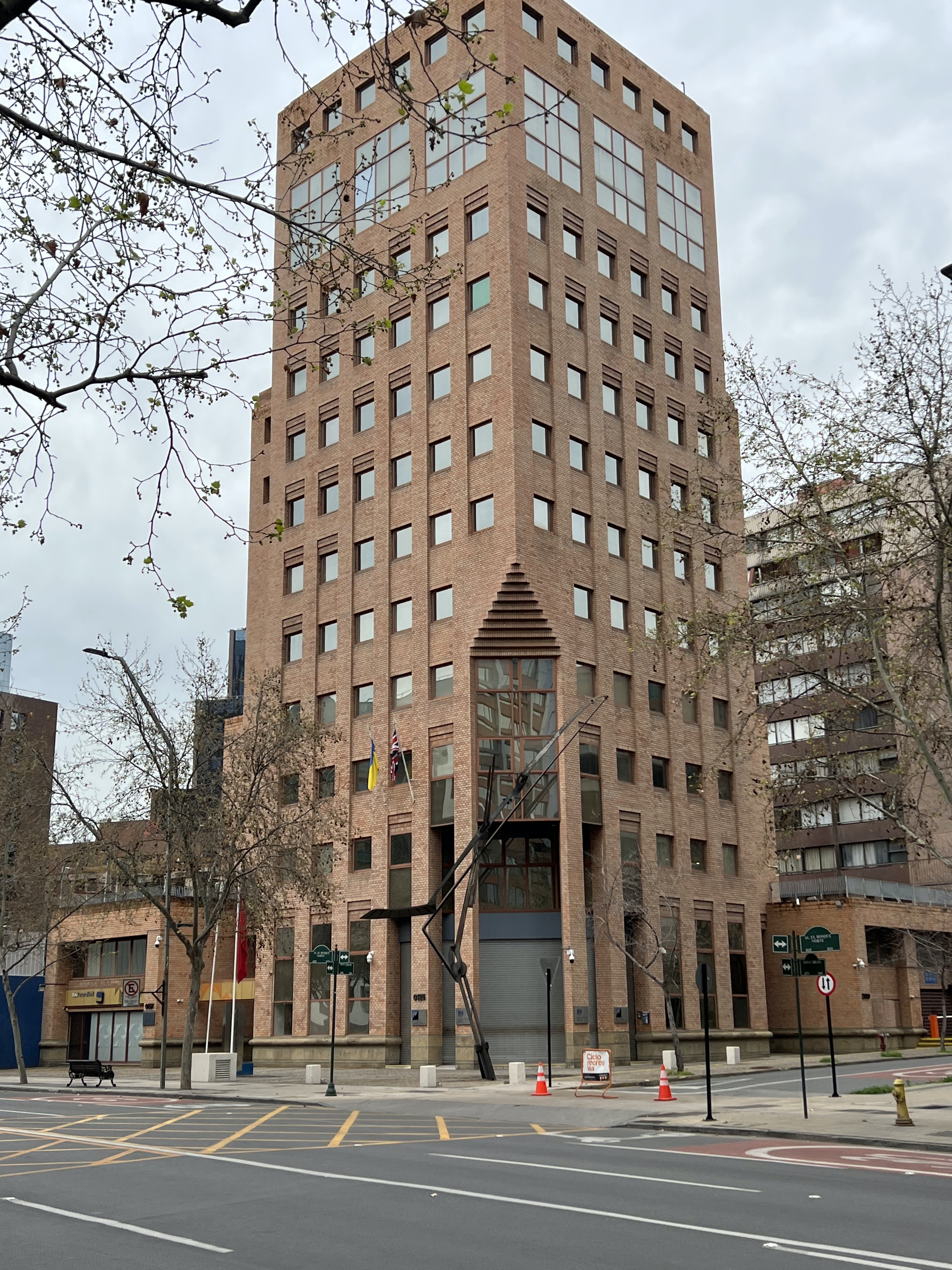
Embassy in Santiago de Chile

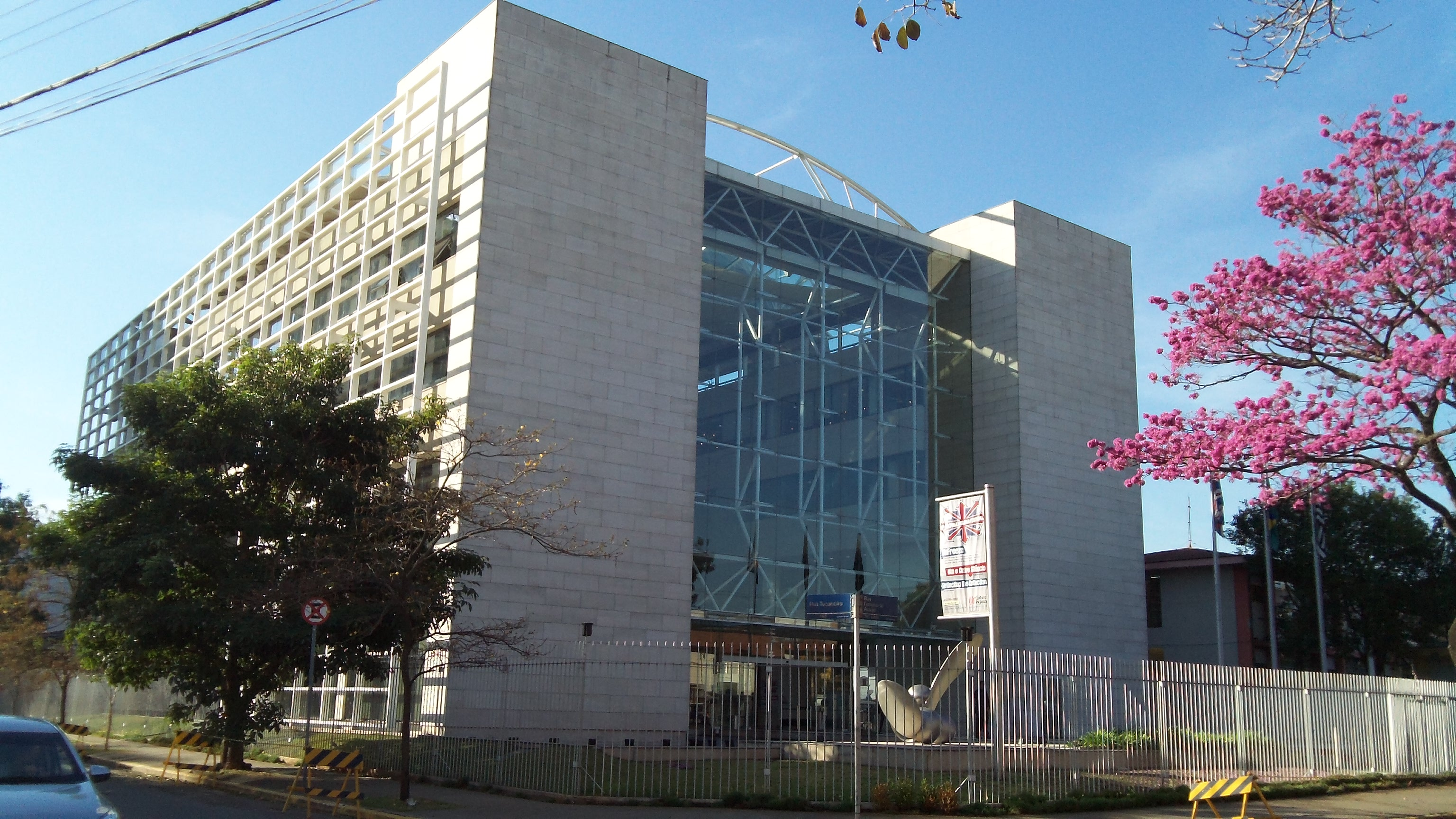
Consulate-General in São Paulo

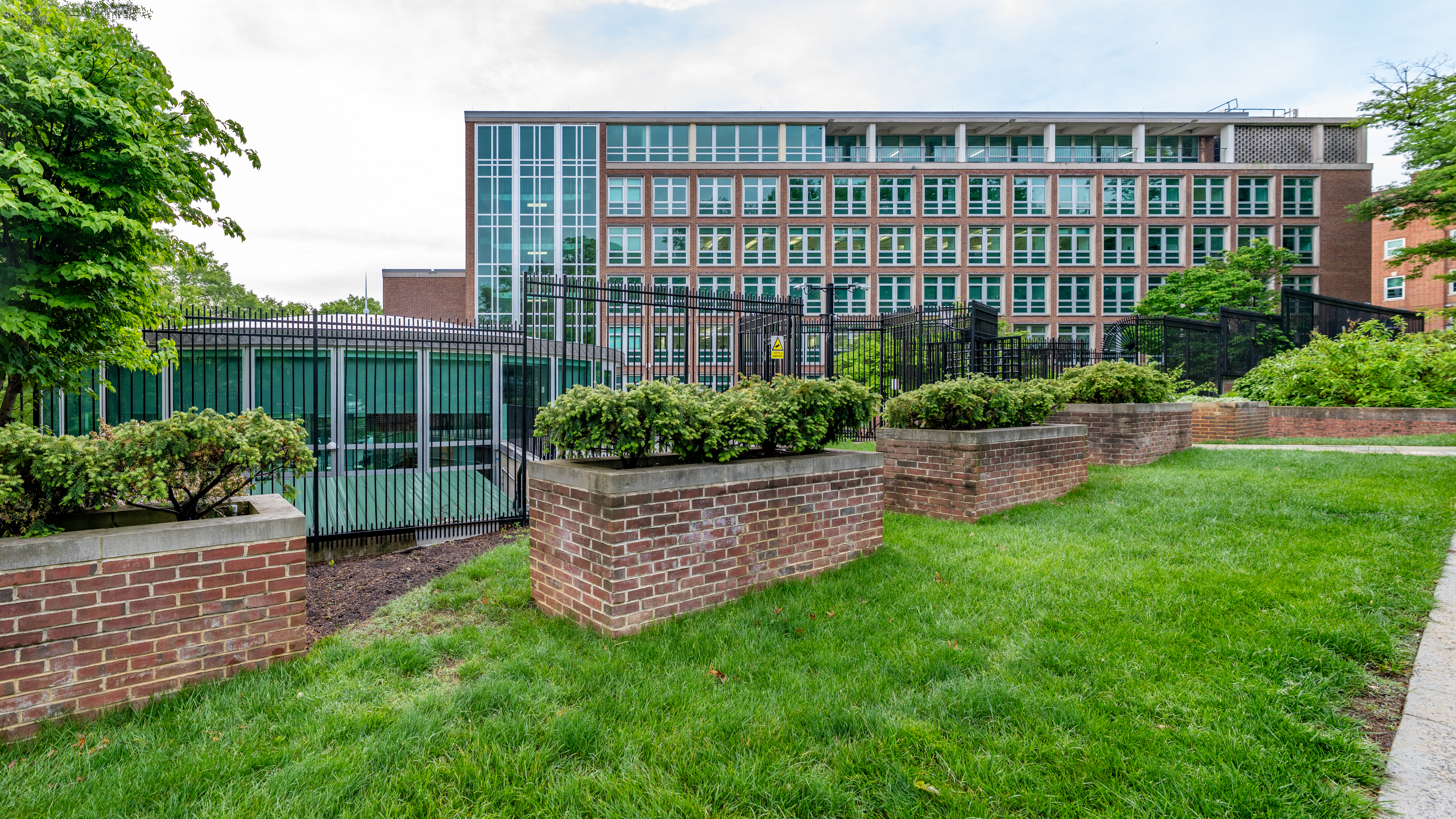
Embassy in Washington, D.C.

=== Asia ===
| Host country | Host city | Mission | Concurrent accreditation | Ref. |
|---|---|---|---|---|
| Armenia | Yerevan | Embassy | | |
| Azerbaijan | Baku | Embassy | | |
| Bahrain | Manama | Embassy | | |
| Bangladesh | Dhaka | High Commission | | |
| Brunei | Bandar Seri Begawan | High Commission | | |
| Cambodia | Phnom Penh | Embassy | | |
| China | Beijing | Embassy | | |
| China | Chongqing | Consulate-General | | |
| China | Guangzhou | Consulate-General | | |
| China | Hong Kong | Consulate-General (Note: The British Consulate-General, Hong Kong reports directly to the FCDO, instead of the British embassy in Beijing) | | |
| China | Shanghai | Consulate-General | | |
| China | Wuhan | Consulate-General | | |
| Georgia | Tbilisi | Embassy | | |
| India | New Delhi | High Commission | Country: Bhutan | |
| India | Ahmedabad | Deputy High Commission | Country: Bhutan | |
| India | Bengaluru | Deputy High Commission | Country: Bhutan | |
| India | Chandigarh | Deputy High Commission | Country: Bhutan | |
| India | Chennai | Deputy High Commission | Country: Bhutan | |
| India | Hyderabad | Deputy High Commission | Country: Bhutan | |
| India | Kolkata | Deputy High Commission | Country: Bhutan | |
| India | Mumbai | Deputy High Commission | Country: Bhutan | |
| India | Panaji | British Nationals Assistance Office | Country: Bhutan | |
| Indonesia | Jakarta | Embassy | Country: Timor-Leste | |
| Iran | Tehran | Embassy | | |
| Iraq | Baghdad | Embassy | | |
| Iraq | Erbil | Consulate-General | | |
| Israel | Tel Aviv | Embassy | | |
| Japan | Tokyo | Embassy | | |
| Japan | Osaka | Consulate-General | | |
| Jordan | Amman | Embassy | | |
| Kazakhstan | Astana | Embassy | | |
| Kuwait | Kuwait City | Embassy | | |
| Kyrgyzstan | Bishkek | Embassy | | |
| Laos | Vientiane | Embassy | | |
| Lebanon | Beirut | Embassy | | |
| Maldives | Malé | High Commission | | |
| Malaysia | Kuala Lumpur | High Commission | | |
| Mongolia | Ulaanbaatar | Embassy | | |
| Myanmar | Yangon | Embassy | | |
| Nepal | Kathmandu | Embassy | | |
| Oman | Muscat | Embassy | | |
| Pakistan | Islamabad | High Commission | | |
| Pakistan | Karachi | Deputy High Commission | | |
| Pakistan | Lahore | High Commission Office | | |
| Philippines | Manila | Embassy | Country: Palau | |
| Qatar | Doha | Embassy | | |
| Saudi Arabia | Riyadh | Embassy | | |
| Saudi Arabia | Jeddah | Consulate-General | | |
| Singapore | Singapore | High Commission | | |
| South Korea | Seoul | Embassy | | |
| Sri Lanka | Colombo | High Commission | | |
| Republic of China (Taiwan) | Taipei | Office | | |
| Tajikistan | Dushanbe | Embassy | | |
| Thailand | Bangkok | Embassy | | |
| Turkey | Ankara | Embassy | | |
| Turkey | Istanbul | Consulate-General | | |
| Turkey | İzmir | Consulate | | |
| Turkey | Antalya | Vice Consulate | | |
| Turkmenistan | Ashgabat | Embassy | | |
| United Arab Emirates | Abu Dhabi | Embassy | | |
| United Arab Emirates | Dubai | Embassy/Consulate-General | | |
| Uzbekistan | Tashkent | Embassy | | |
| Vietnam | Hanoi | Embassy | | |
| Vietnam | Ho Chi Minh City | Consulate-General | | |

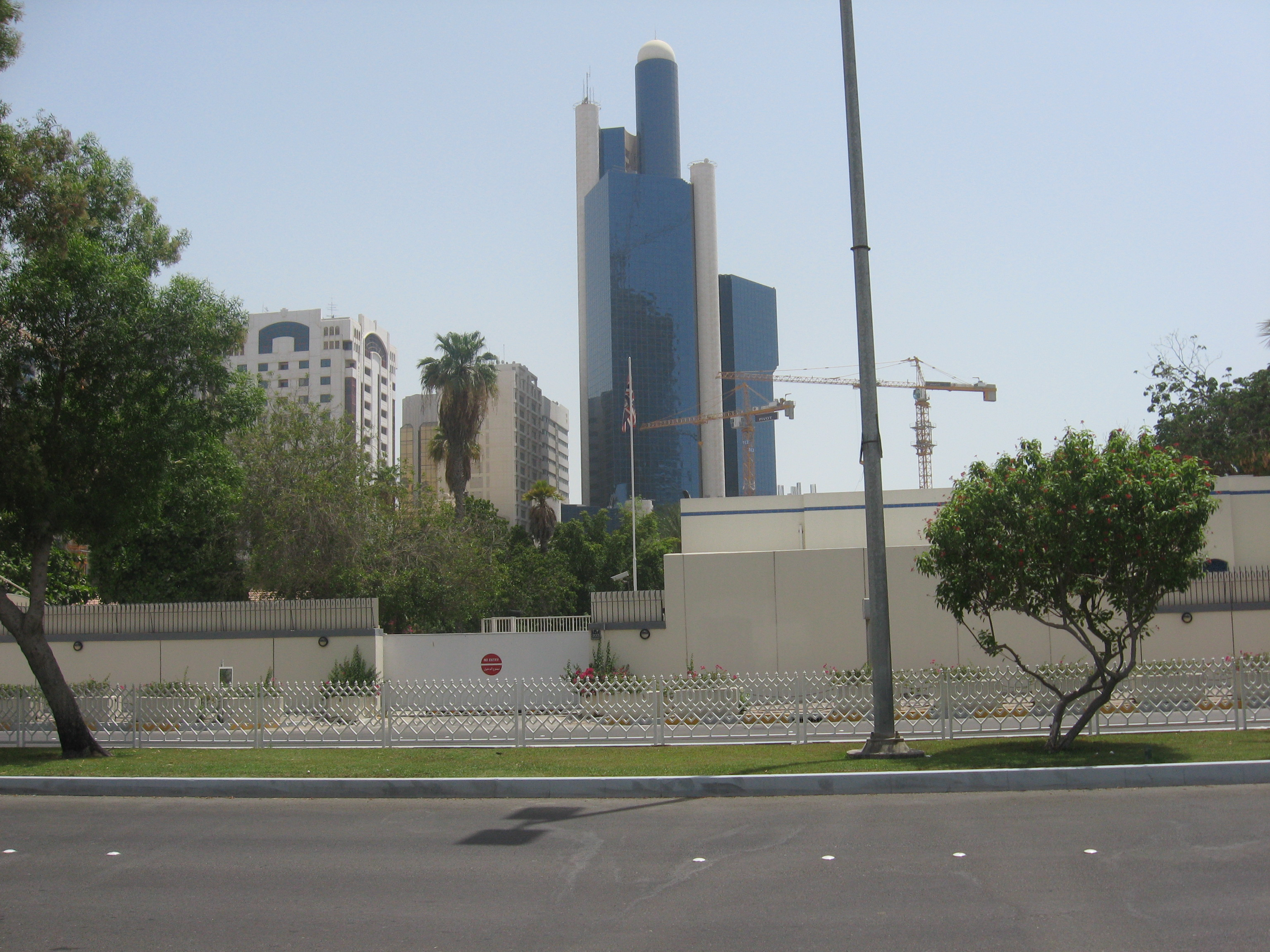
Embassy in Abu Dhabi

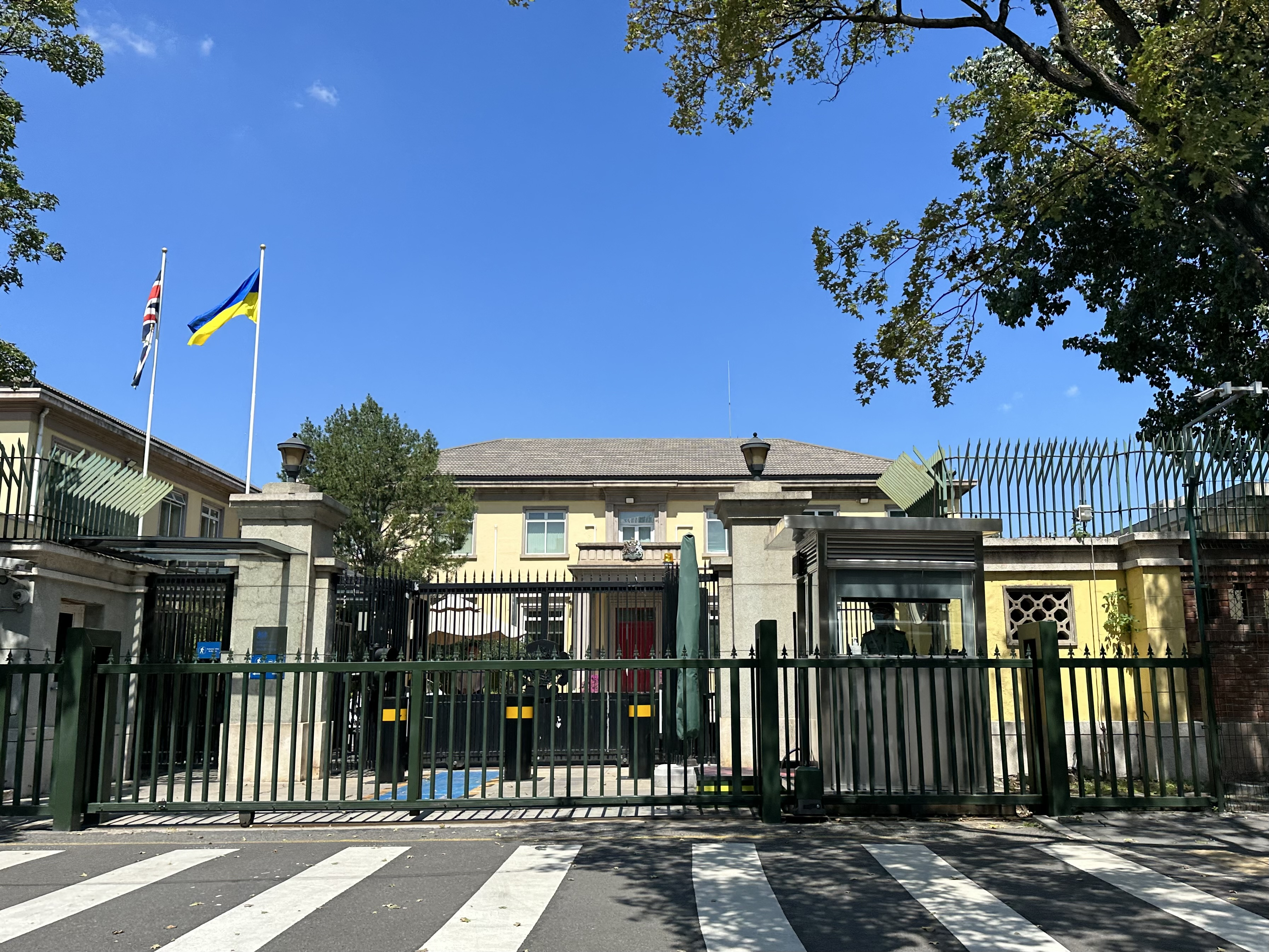
Embassy in Beijing

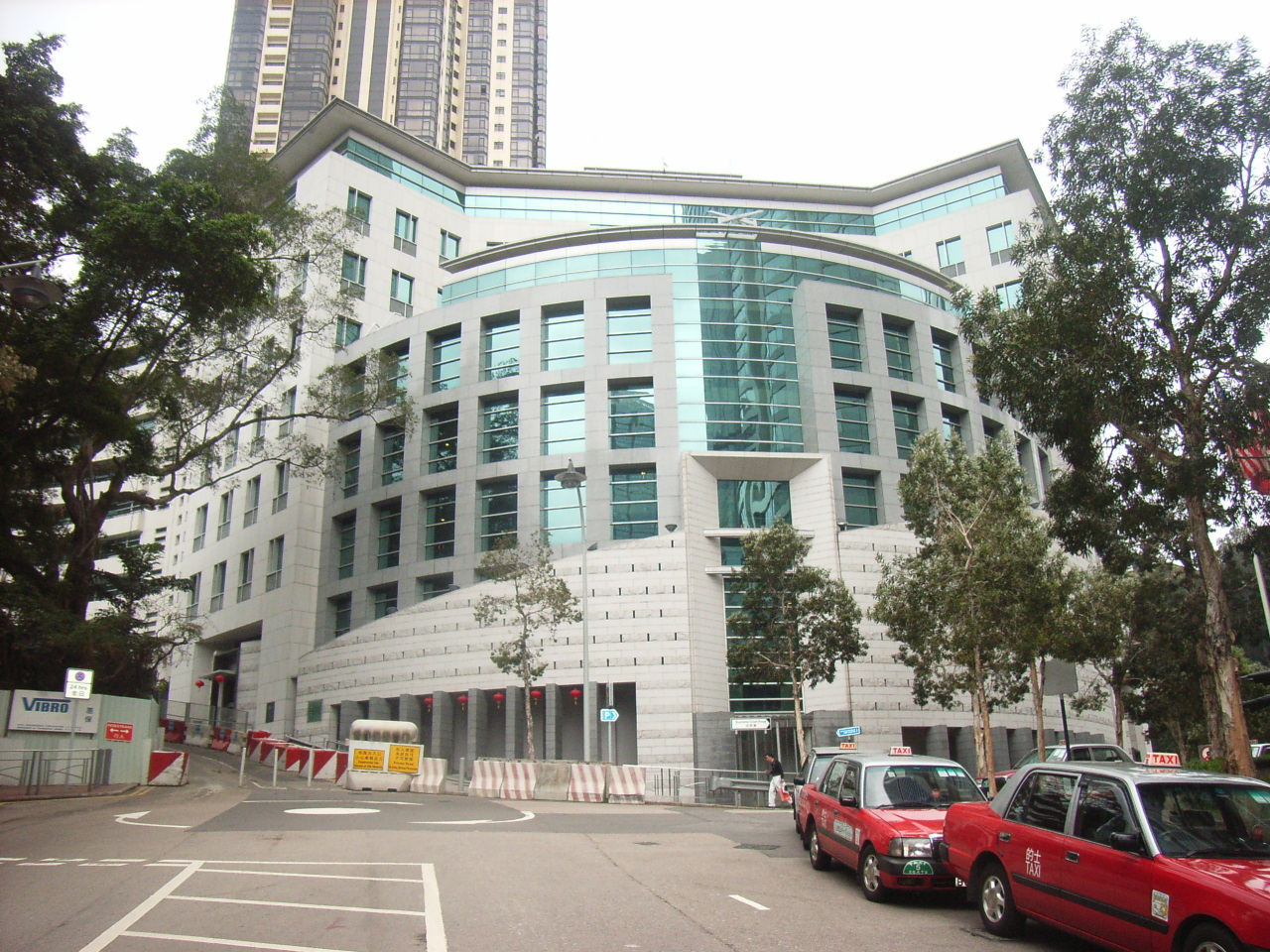
Consulate-General in Hong Kong

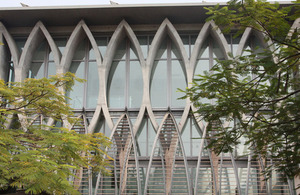
High Commission in Dhaka

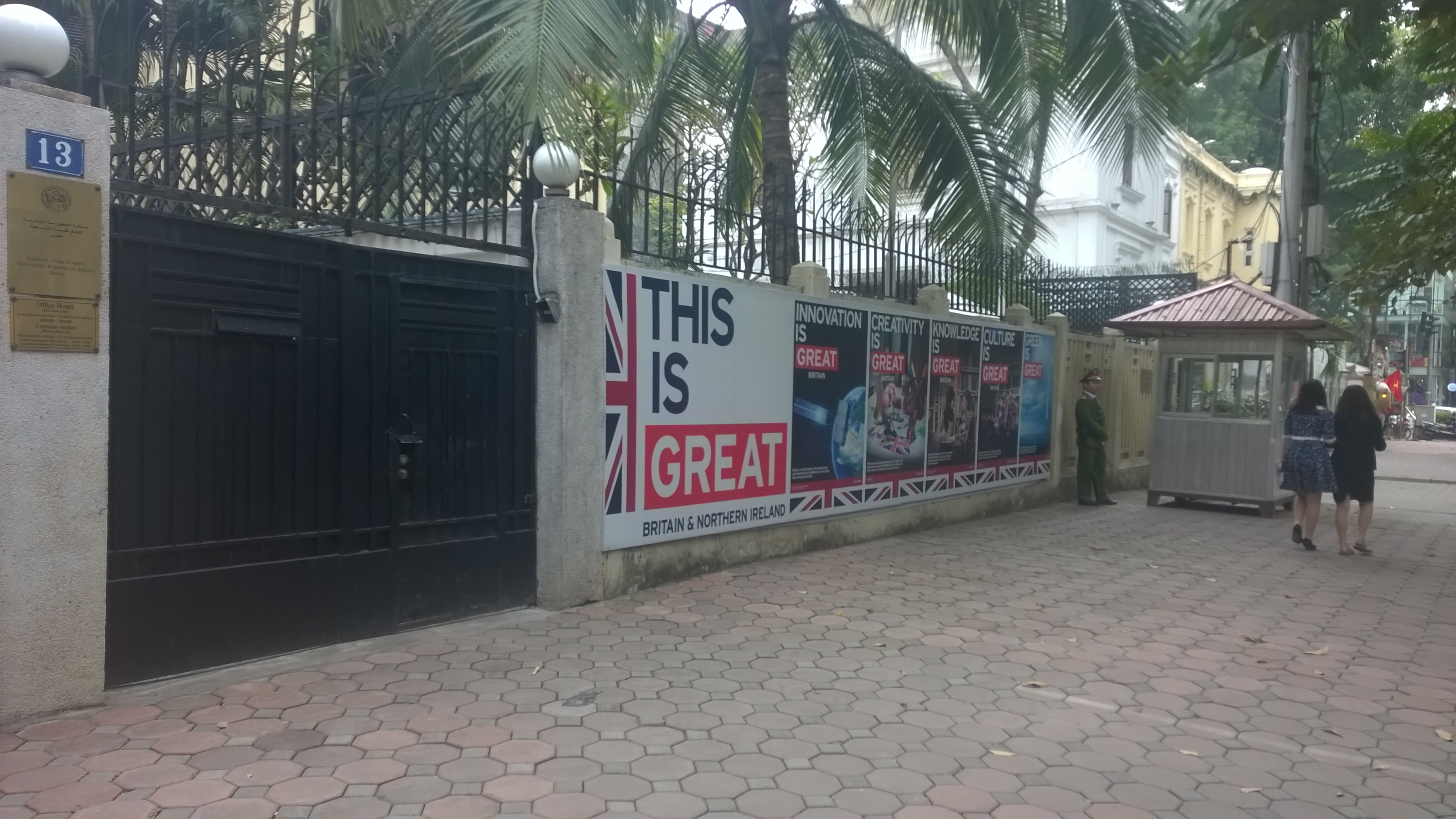
Embassy in Hanoi

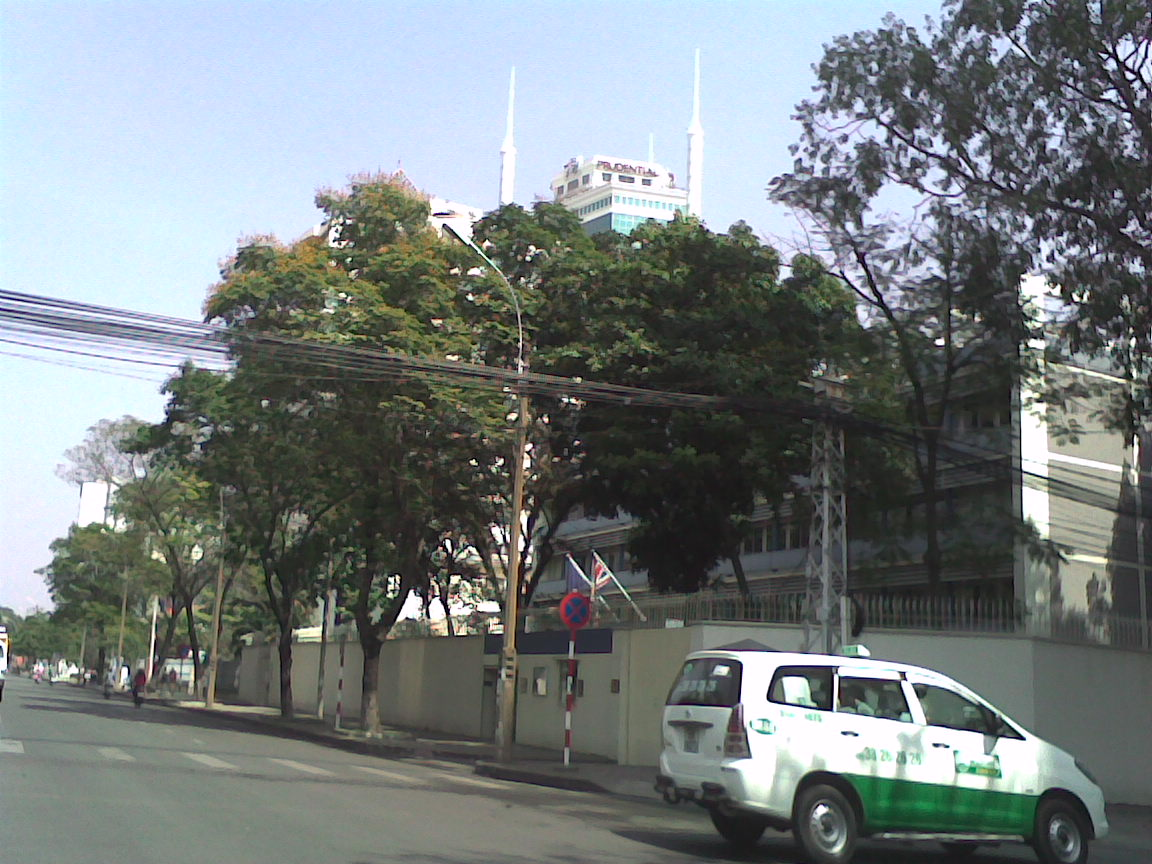
Consulate-General in Ho Chi Minh City

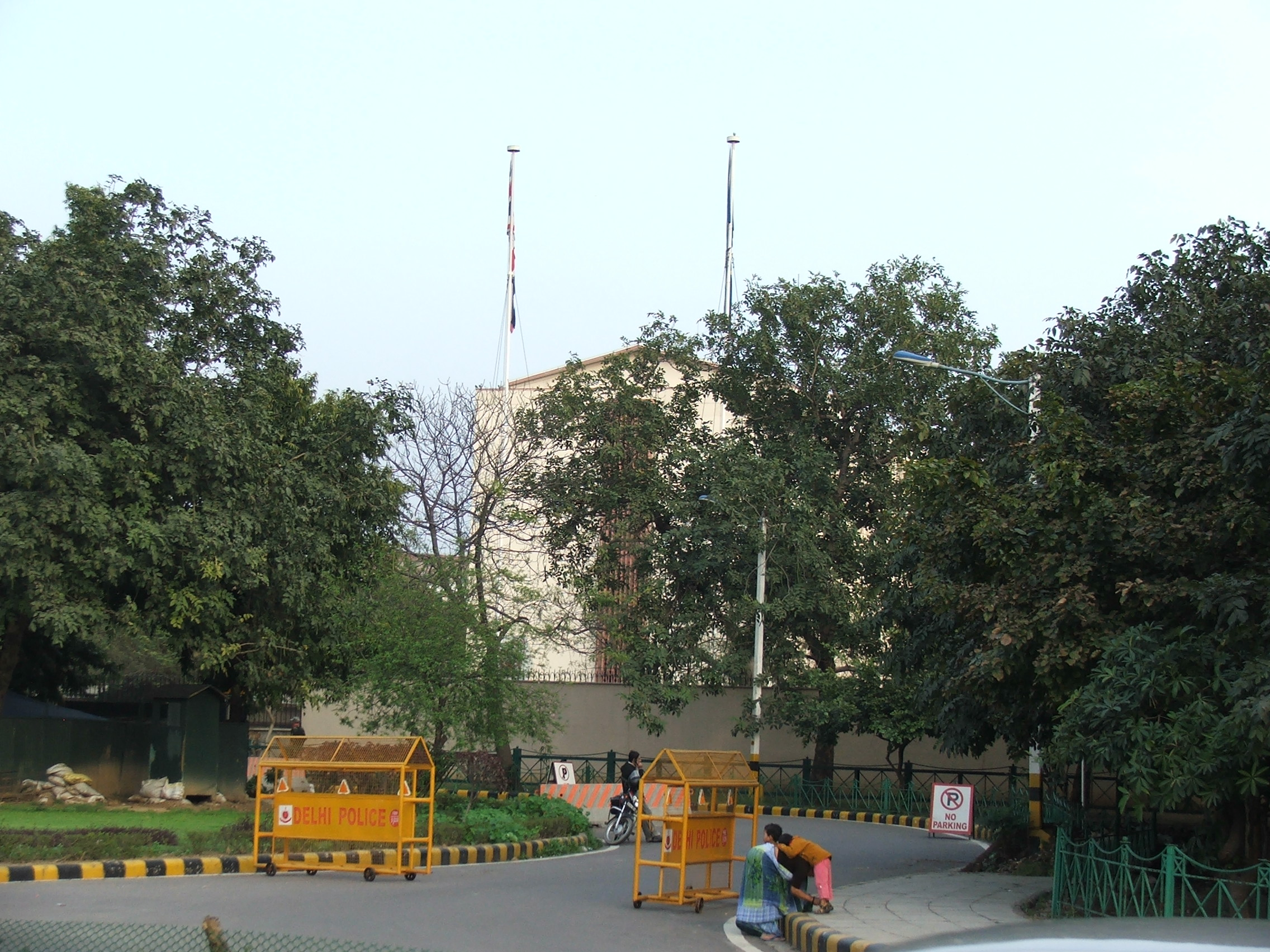
High Commission in New Delhi

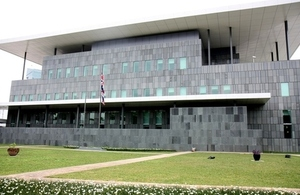
Embassy in Jakarta

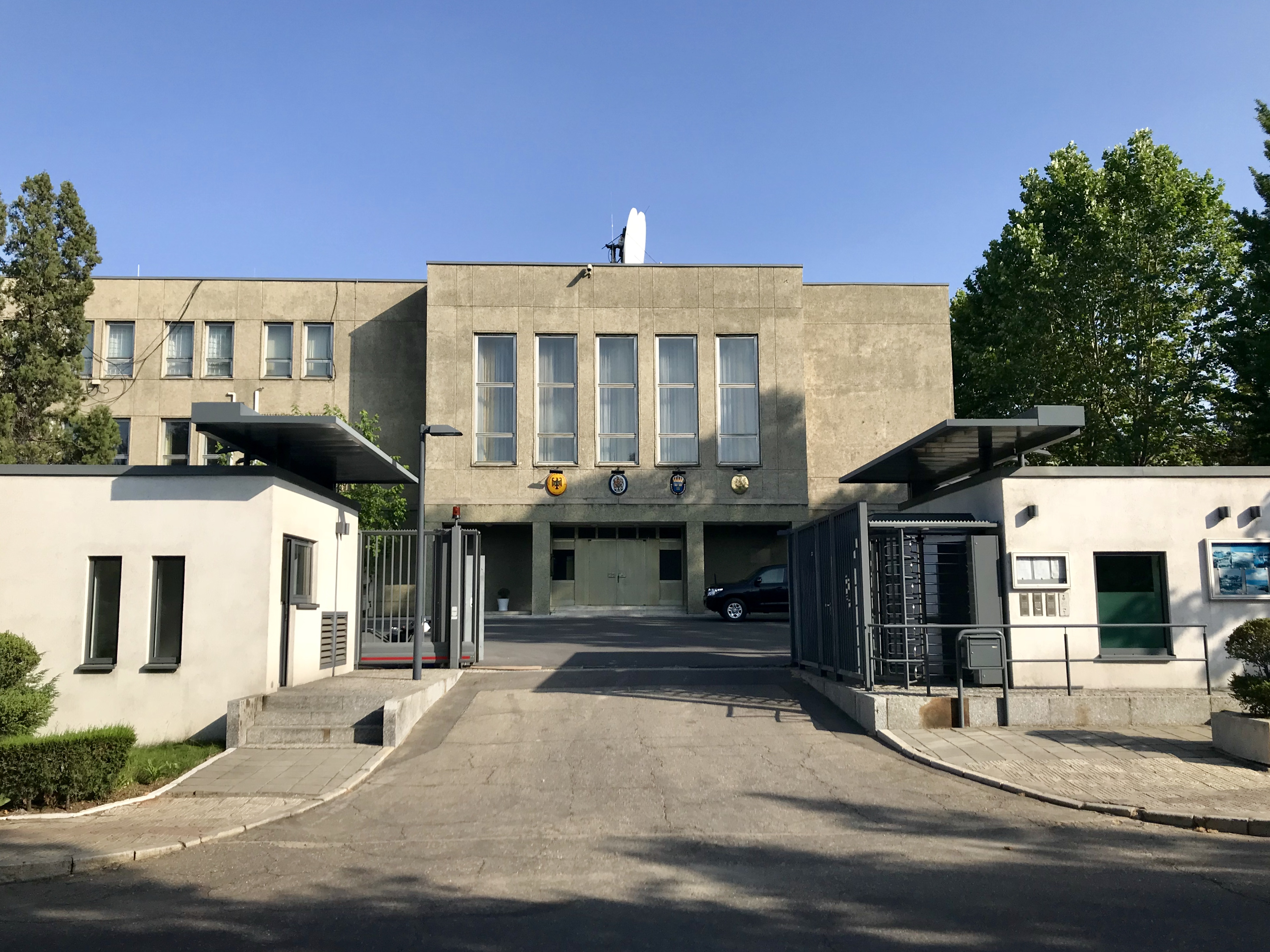
Embassy in Pyongyang

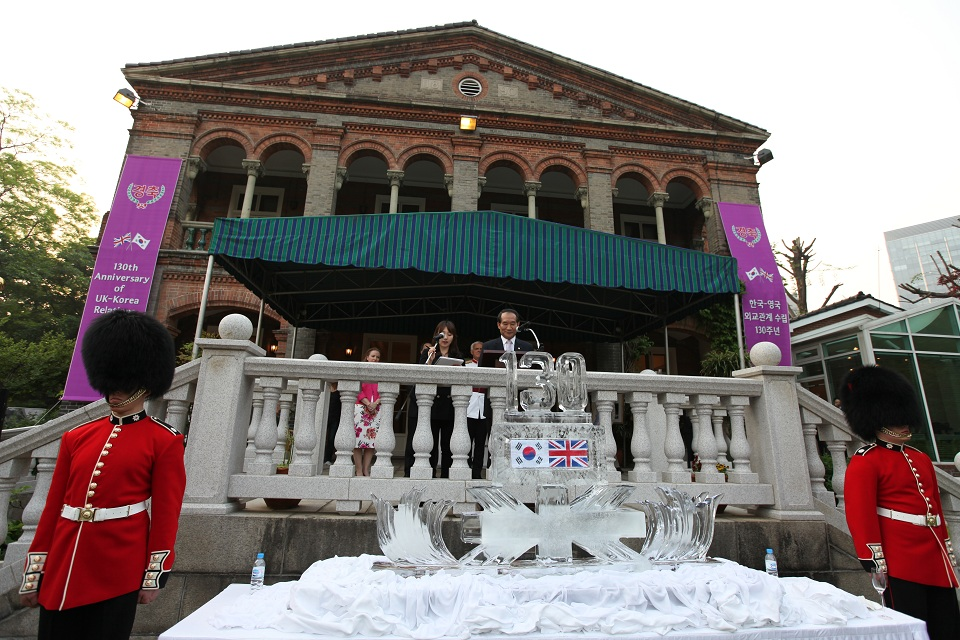
Embassy in Seoul

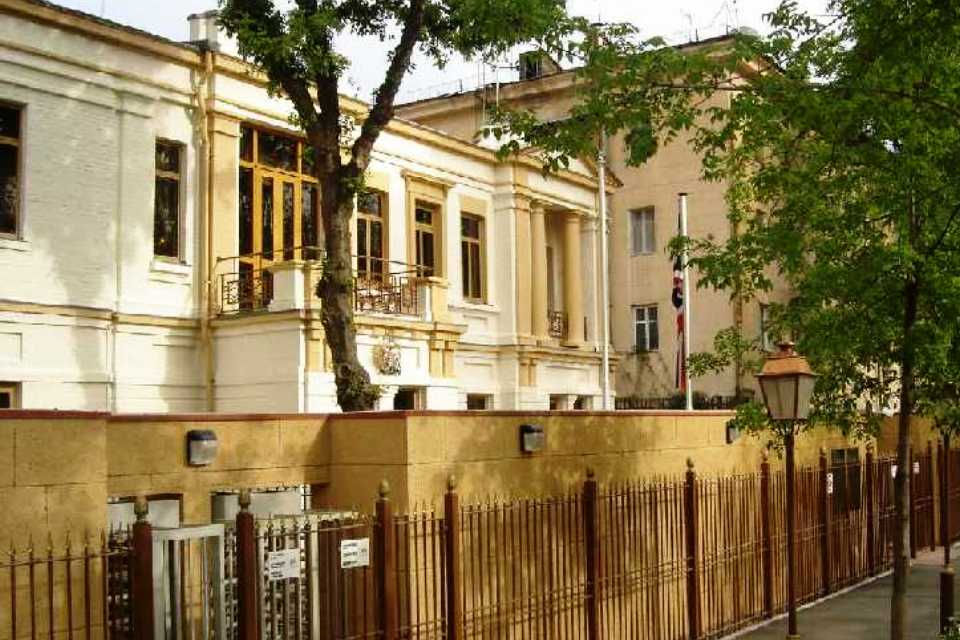
Embassy in Tashkent

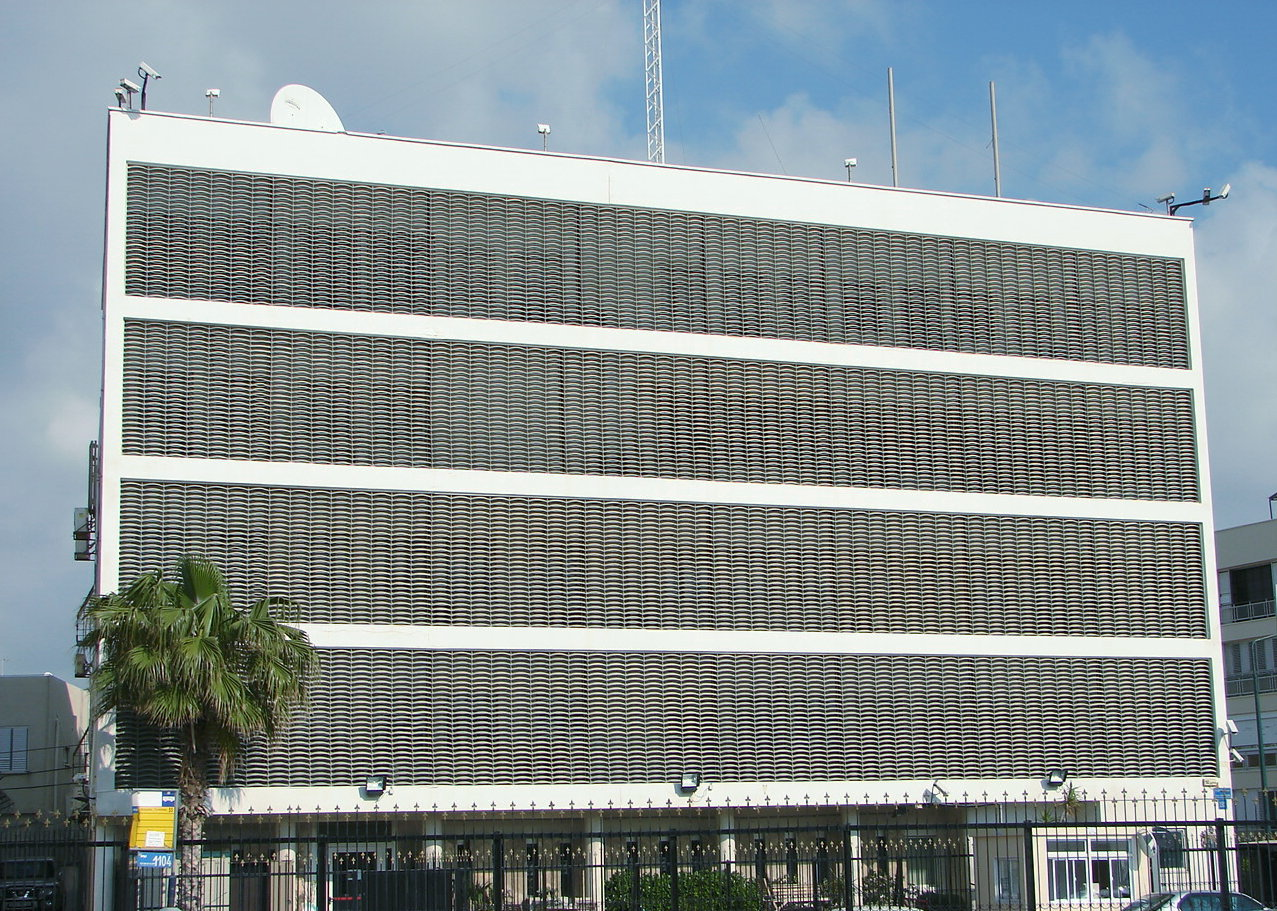
Embassy in Tel Aviv

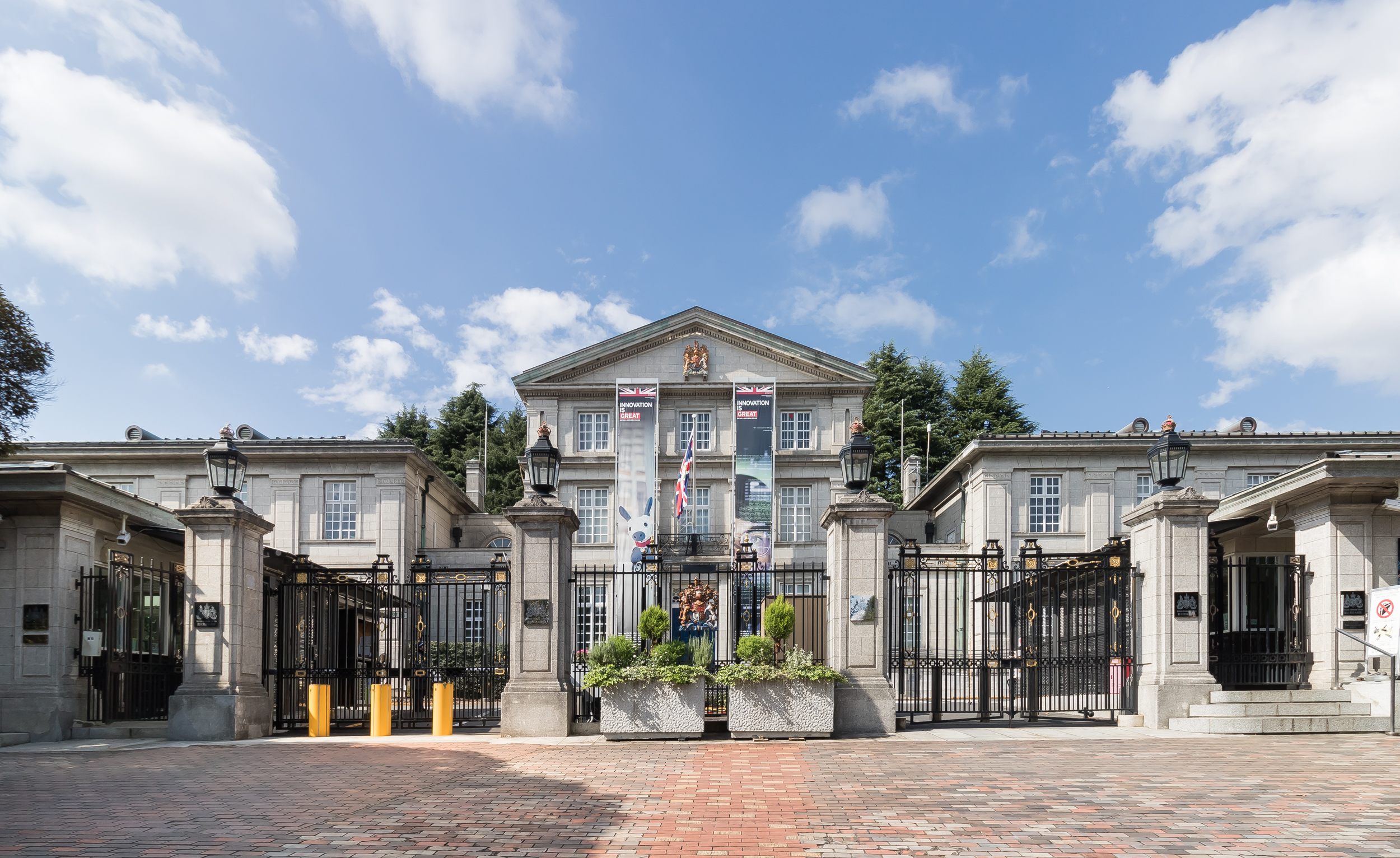
Embassy in Tokyo

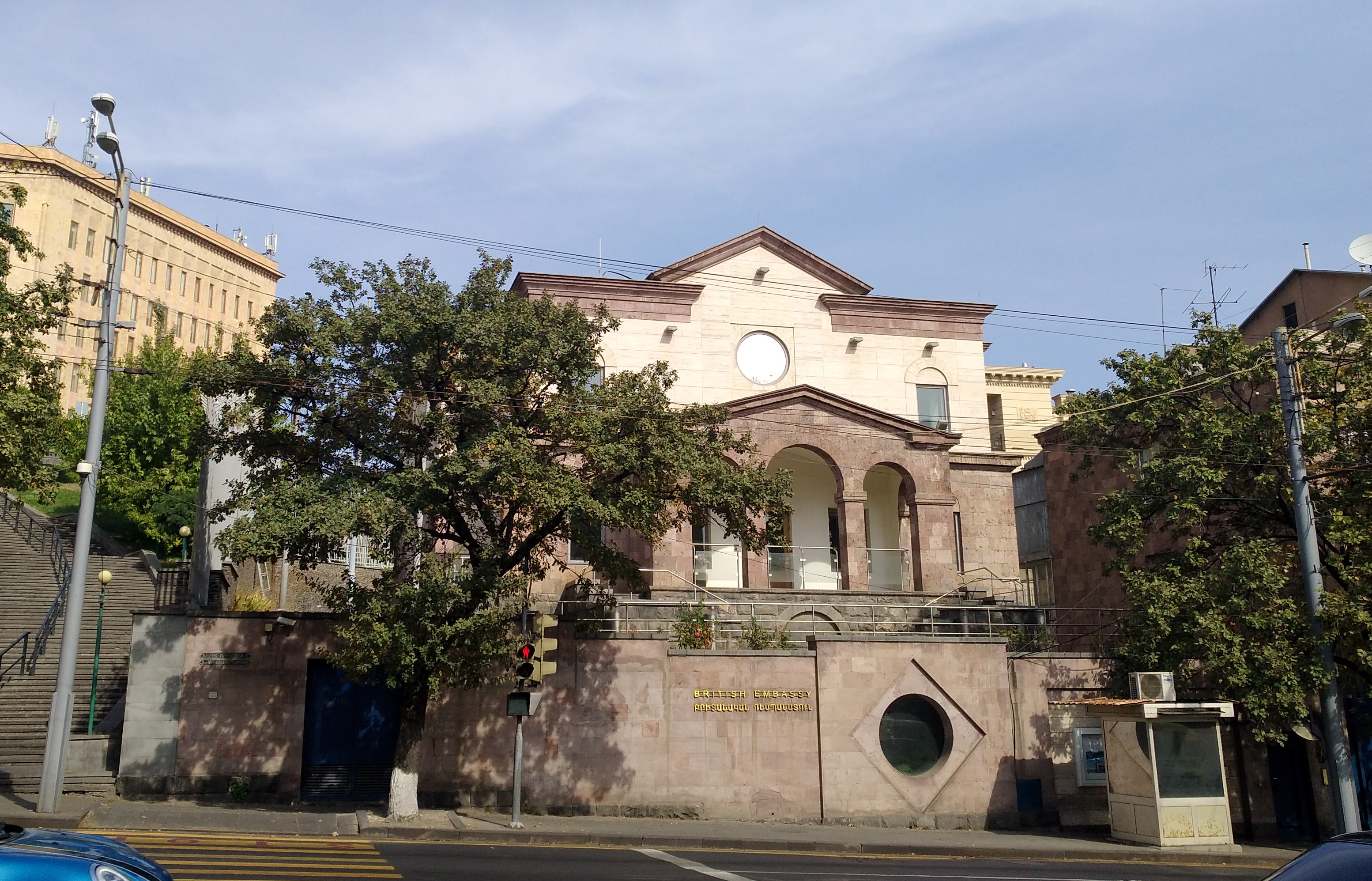
Embassy in Yerevan

=== Europe ===
| Host country | Host city | Mission | Concurrent accreditation | Ref. |
|---|---|---|---|---|
| Albania | Tirana | Embassy | | |
| Austria | Vienna | Embassy | | |
| Belarus | Minsk | Embassy | | |
| Belgium | Brussels | Embassy | | |
| Bosnia and Herzegovina | Sarajevo | Embassy | | |
| Bosnia and Herzegovina | Banja Luka | Embassy office | | |
| Bulgaria | Sofia | Embassy | | |
| Croatia | Zagreb | Embassy | | |
| Croatia | Split | Consulate | | |
| Cyprus | Nicosia | High Commission | | |
| Czech Republic | Prague | Embassy | | |
| Denmark | Copenhagen | Embassy | | |
| Estonia | Tallinn | Embassy | | |
| Finland | Helsinki | Embassy | | |
| France | Paris | Embassy | Country: Monaco; International Organizations: UNESCO | |
| France | Bordeaux | Consulate | Country: Monaco; International Organizations: UNESCO | |
| France | Marseille | Consulate | Country: Monaco; International Organizations: UNESCO | |
| Georgia | Tbilisi | Embassy | | |
| Germany | Berlin | Embassy | | |
| Germany | Düsseldorf | Consulate-General | | |
| Germany | Munich | Consulate-General | | |
| Greece | Athens | Embassy | | |
| Greece | Corfu | Vice-Consulate | | |
| Greece | Heraklion | Vice-Consulate | | |
| Greece | Rhodes | Vice-Consulate | | |
| Greece | Zakynthos | Vice-Consulate | | |
| Holy See (Note: The British Embassy to the Holy See is located outside Vatican territory in Rome.) | Rome | Embassy | | |
| Hungary | Budapest | Embassy | | |
| Iceland | Reykjavík | Embassy | | |
| Ireland | Dublin | Embassy | | |
| Italy | Rome | Embassy | Country: San Marino; International Organizations: Food and Agriculture Organization; International Fund for Agricultural Development; World Food Programme | |
| Italy | Milan | Consulate-General | Country: San Marino; International Organizations: Food and Agriculture Organization; International Fund for Agricultural Development; World Food Programme | |
| Kosovo | Pristina | Embassy | | |
| Latvia | Riga | Embassy | | |
| Lithuania | Vilnius | Embassy | | |
| Luxembourg | Luxembourg City | Embassy | | |
| Malta | Valletta | High Commission | | |
| Moldova | Chișinău | Embassy | | |
| Montenegro | Podgorica | Embassy | | |
| Netherlands | The Hague | Embassy | International Organization: Organisation for the Prohibition of Chemical Weapons | |
| North Macedonia | Skopje | Embassy | | |
| Norway | Oslo | Embassy | | |
| Poland | Warsaw | Embassy | | |
| Portugal | Lisbon | Embassy | Country: Cape Verde | |
| Portugal | Portimão | Vice-consulate | Country: Cape Verde | |
| Romania | Bucharest | Embassy | | |
| Russia | Moscow | Embassy | | |
| Russia | Yekaterinburg | Consulate-General | | |
| Serbia | Belgrade | Embassy | | |
| Slovakia | Bratislava | Embassy | | |
| Slovenia | Ljubljana | Embassy | | |
| Spain | Madrid | Embassy | Country: Andorra | |
| Spain | Barcelona | Consulate-General | Country: Andorra | |
| Spain | Alicante | Consulate | Country: Andorra | |
| Spain | Ibiza | Consulate | Country: Andorra | |
| Spain | Las Palmas de Gran Canaria | Consulate | Country: Andorra | |
| Spain | Málaga | Consulate | Country: Andorra | |
| Spain | Palma de Mallorca | Consulate | Country: Andorra | |
| Spain | Santa Cruz de Tenerife | Consulate | Country: Andorra | |
| Sweden | Stockholm | Embassy | | |
| Switzerland | Bern | Embassy | Country: Liechtenstein | |
| Ukraine | Kyiv | Embassy | | |

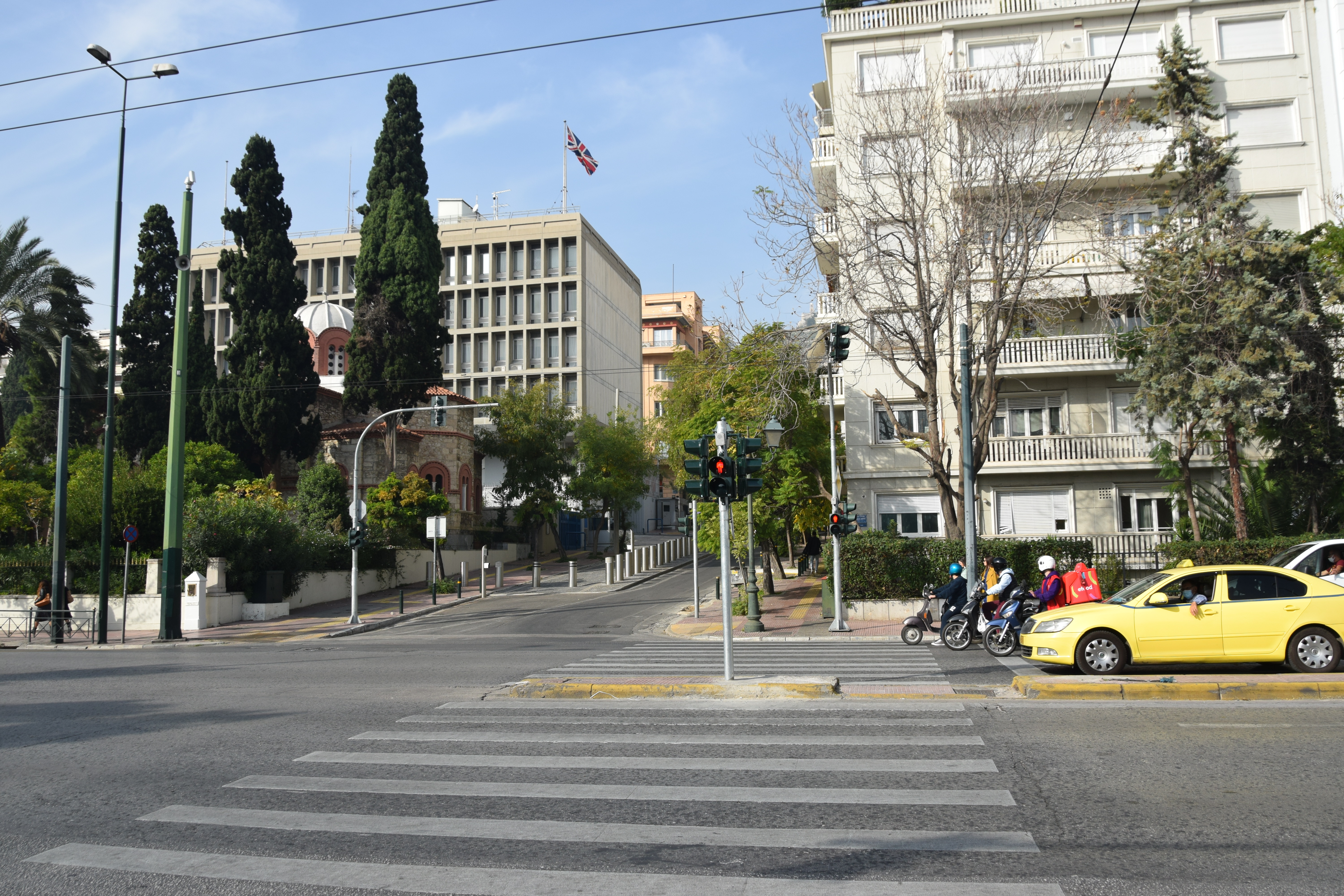
Embassy in Athens

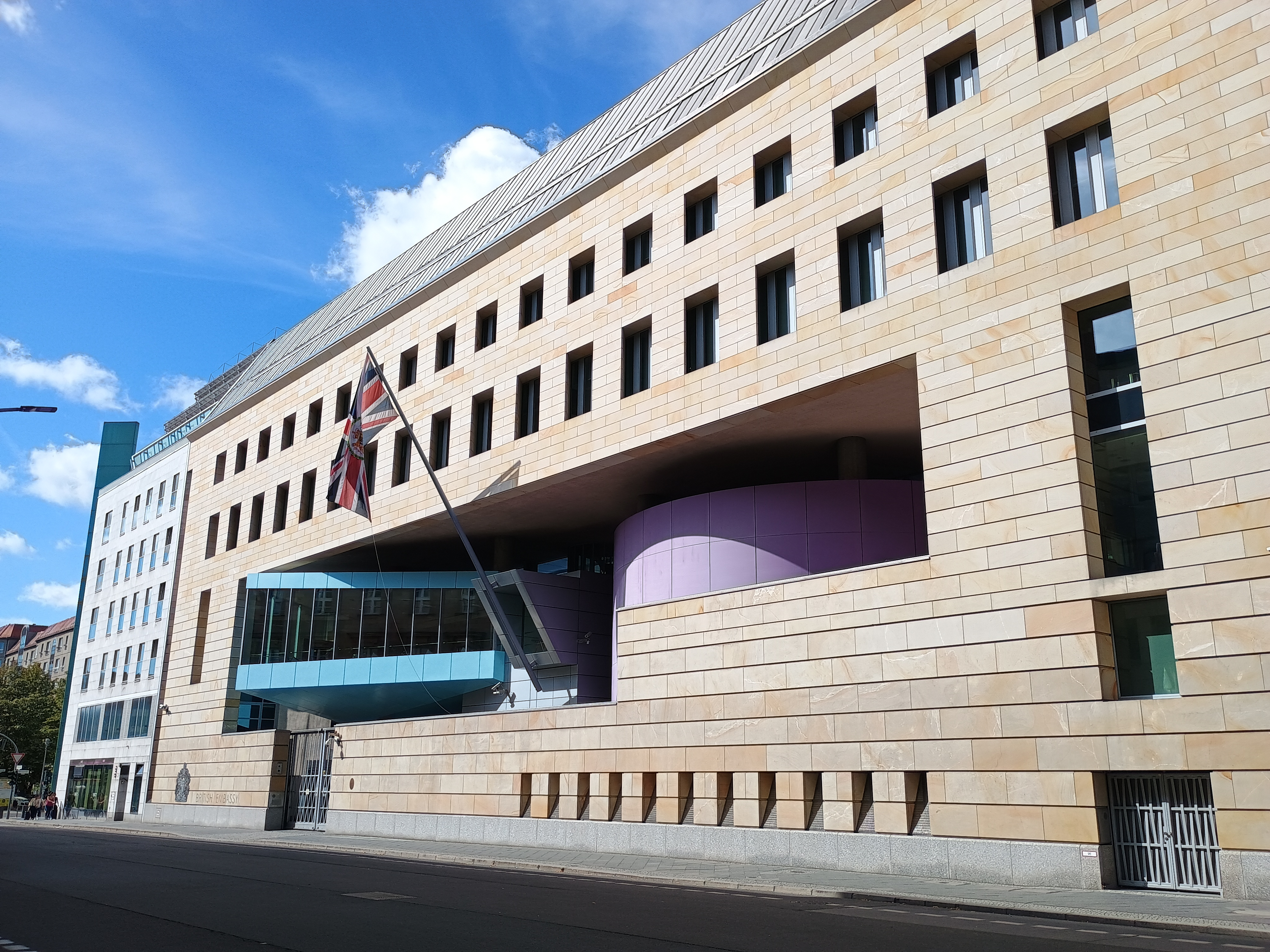
Embassy in Berlin

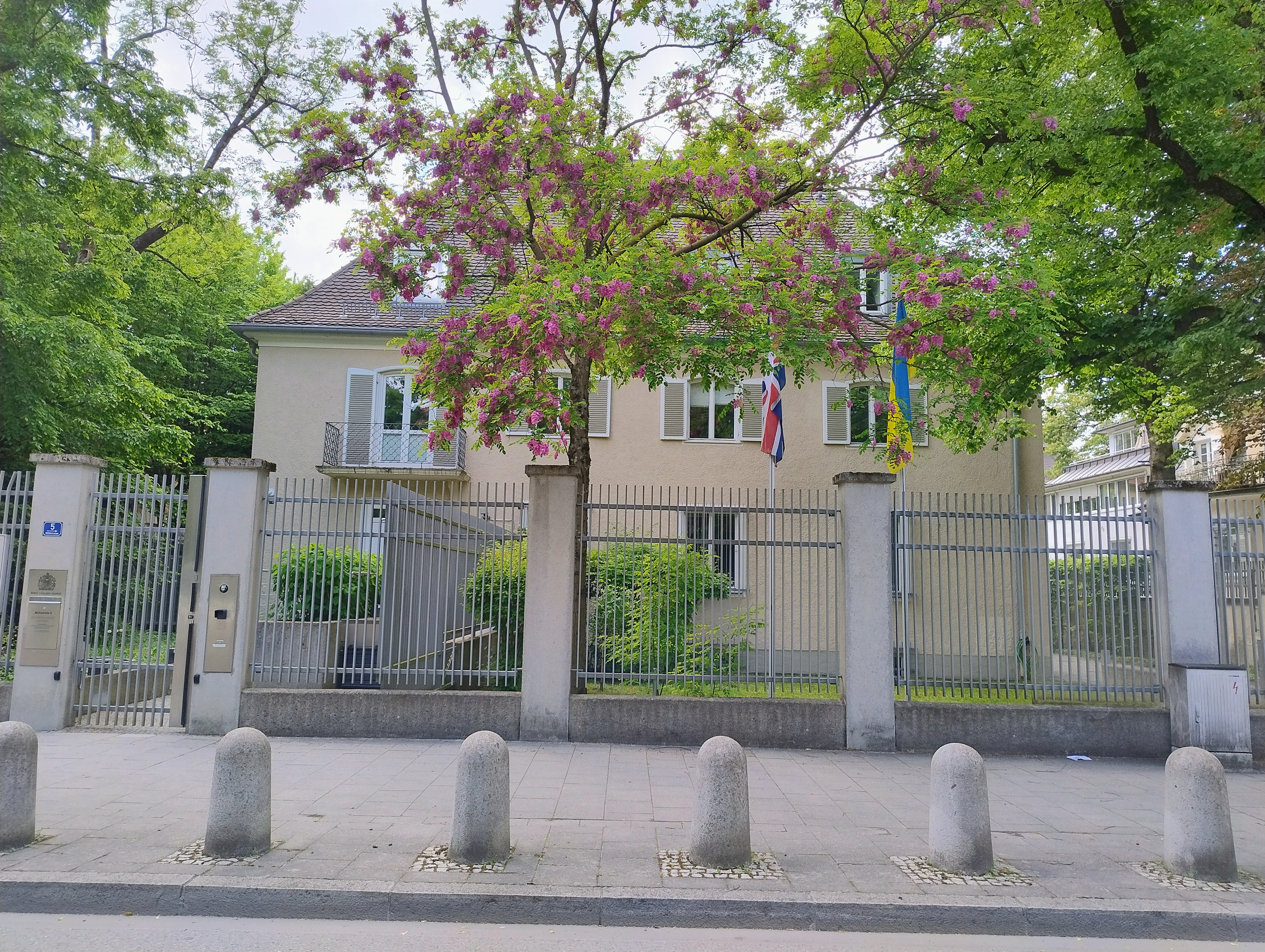
Consulate-General in Munich

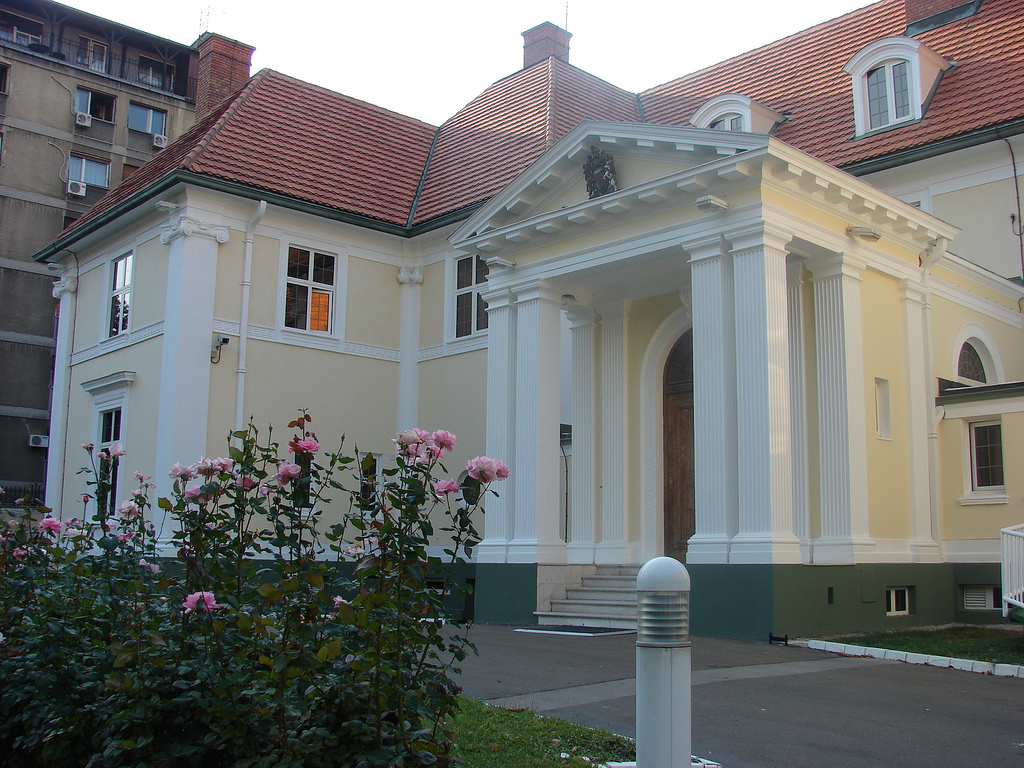
Embassy in Belgrade

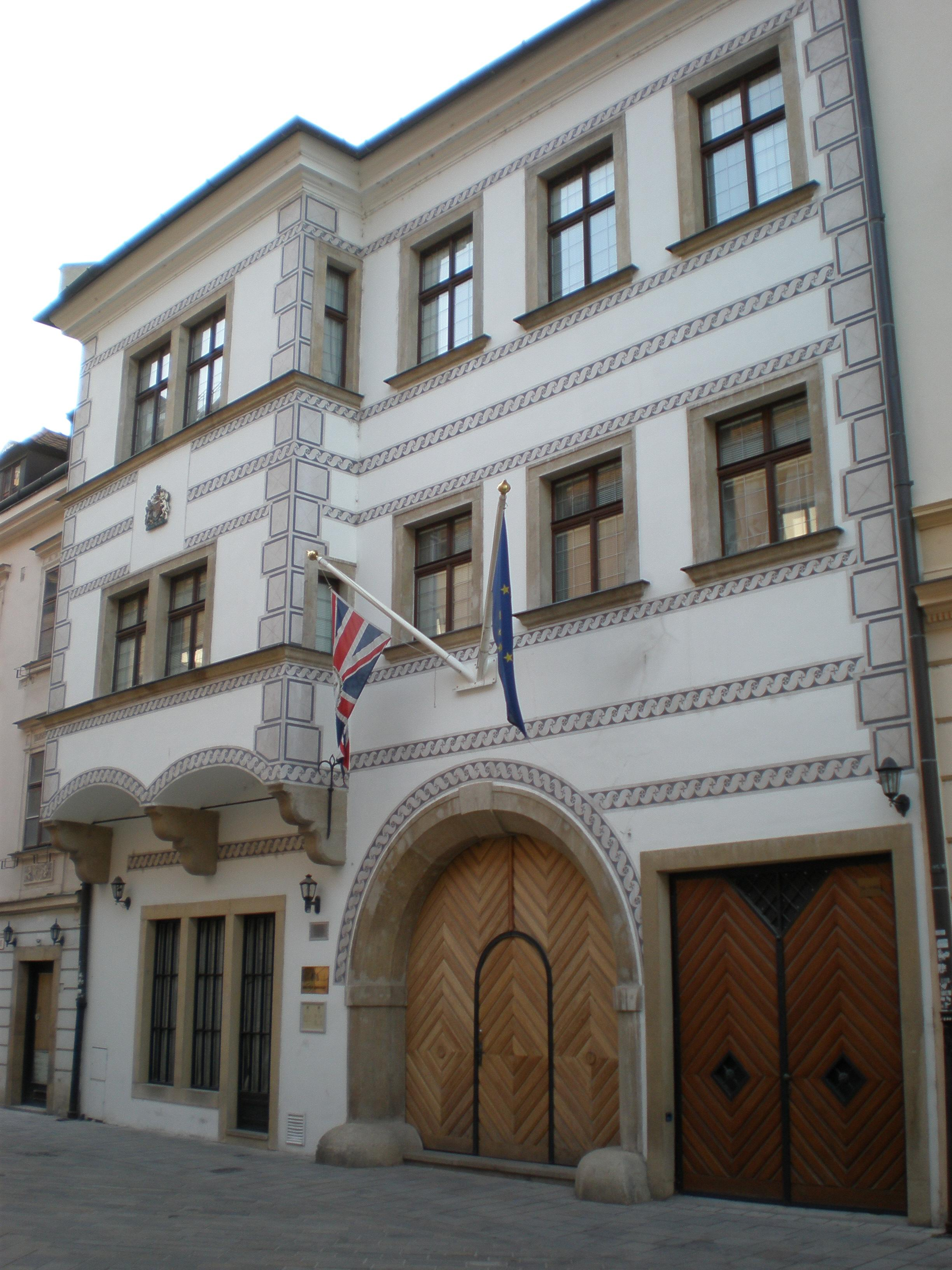
Embassy in Bratislava

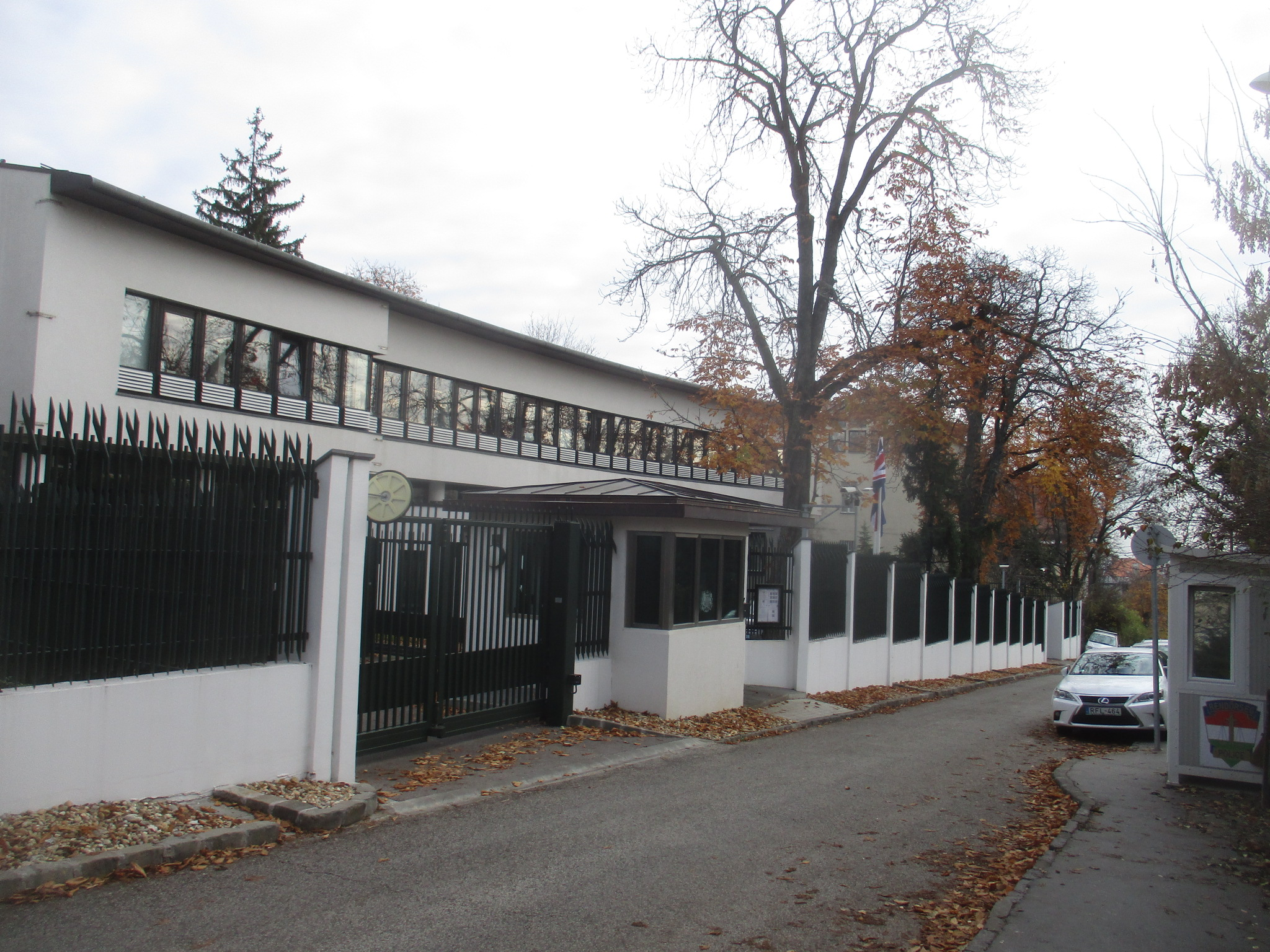
Embassy in Budapest

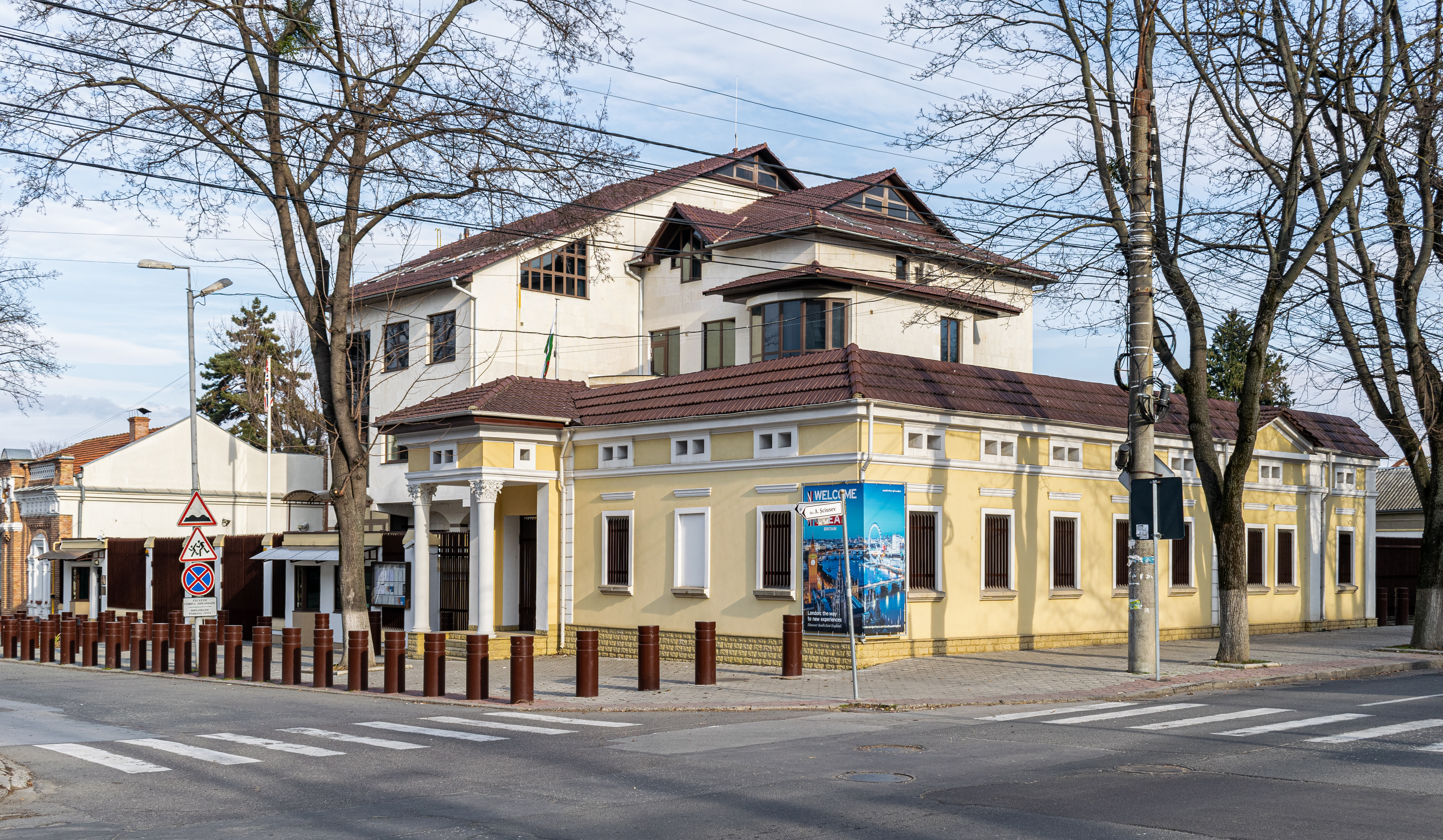
Embassy in Chișinău

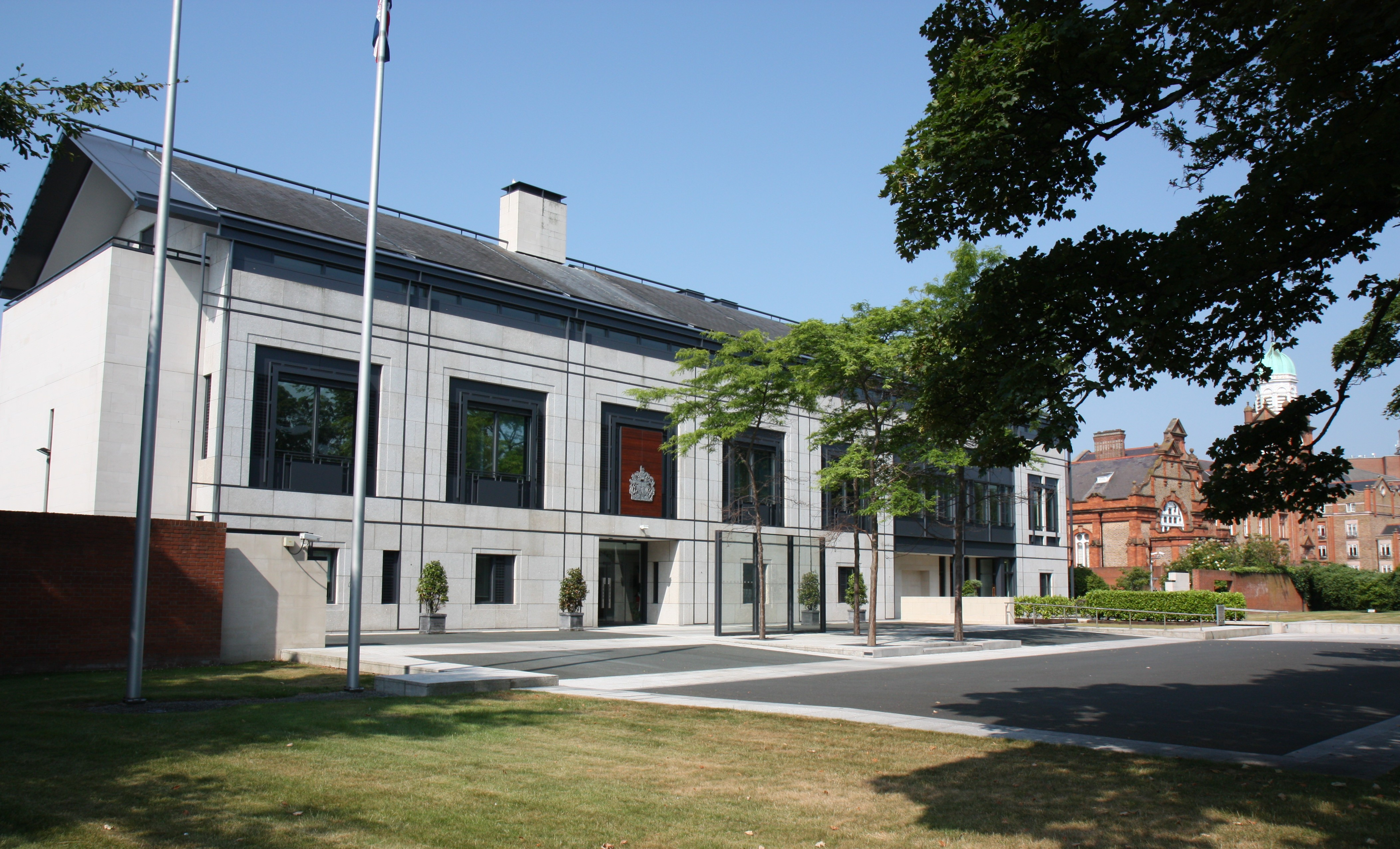
Embassy in Dublin

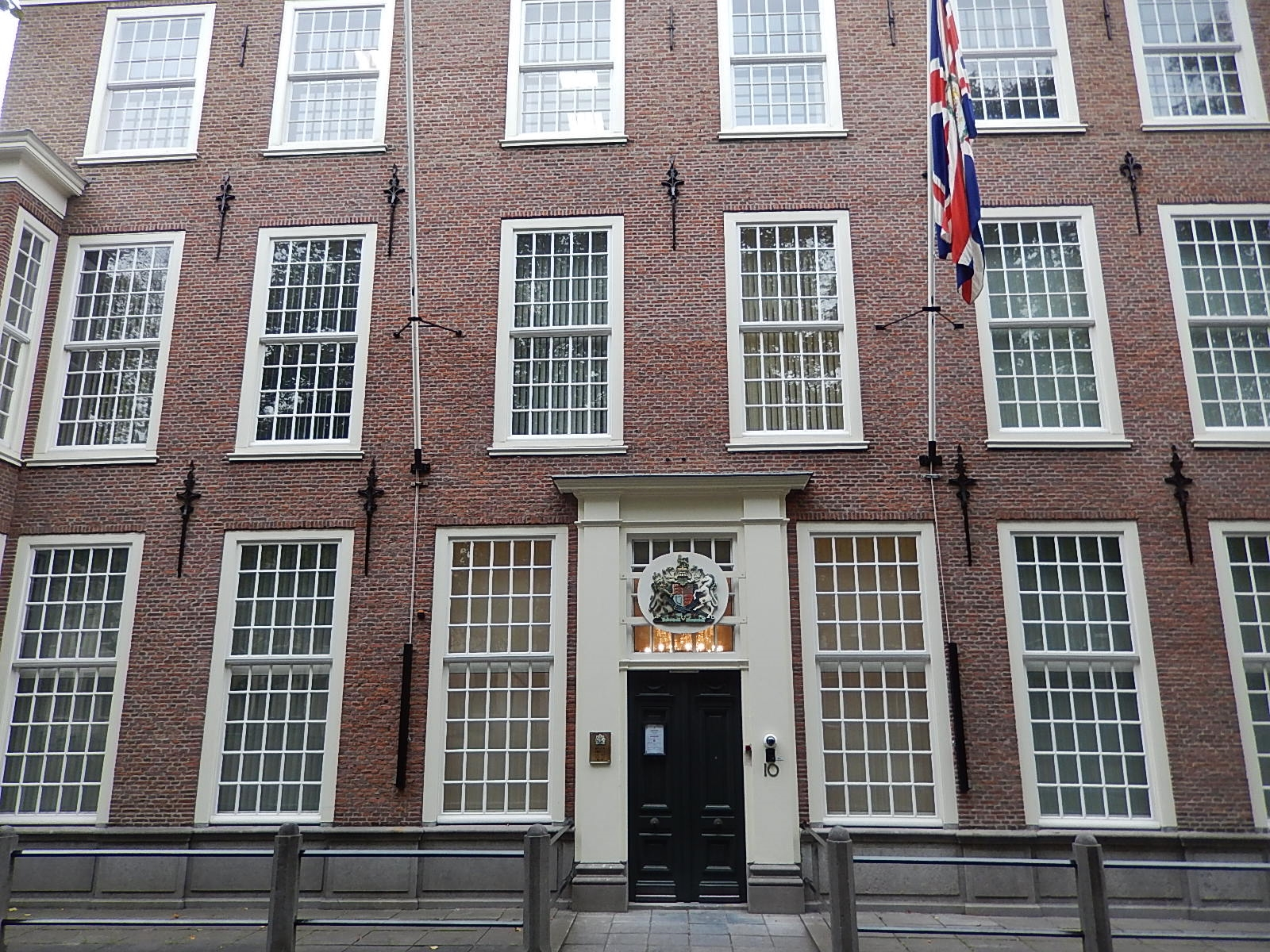
Embassy in The Hague

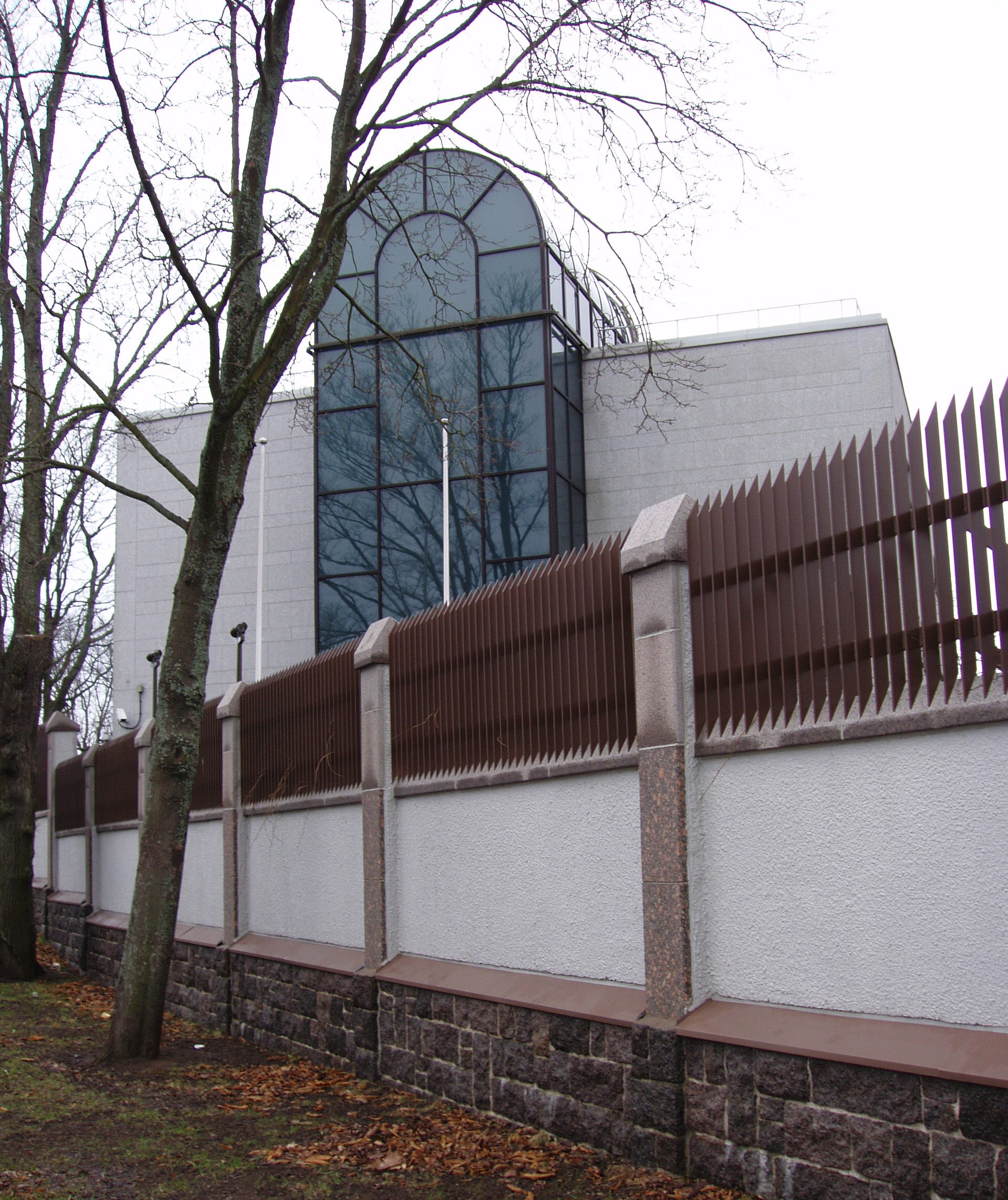
Embassy in Helsinki

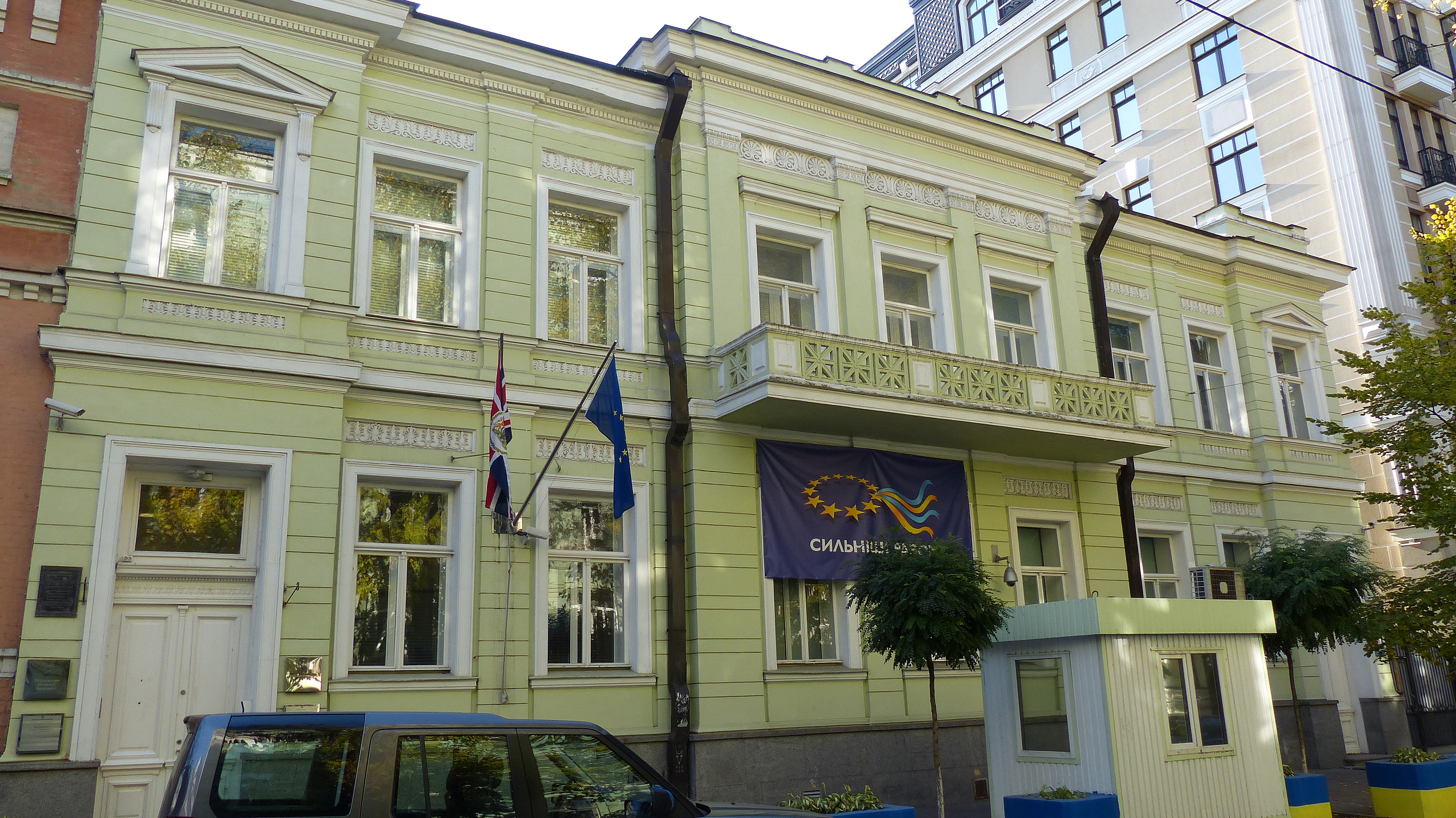
Embassy in Kyiv

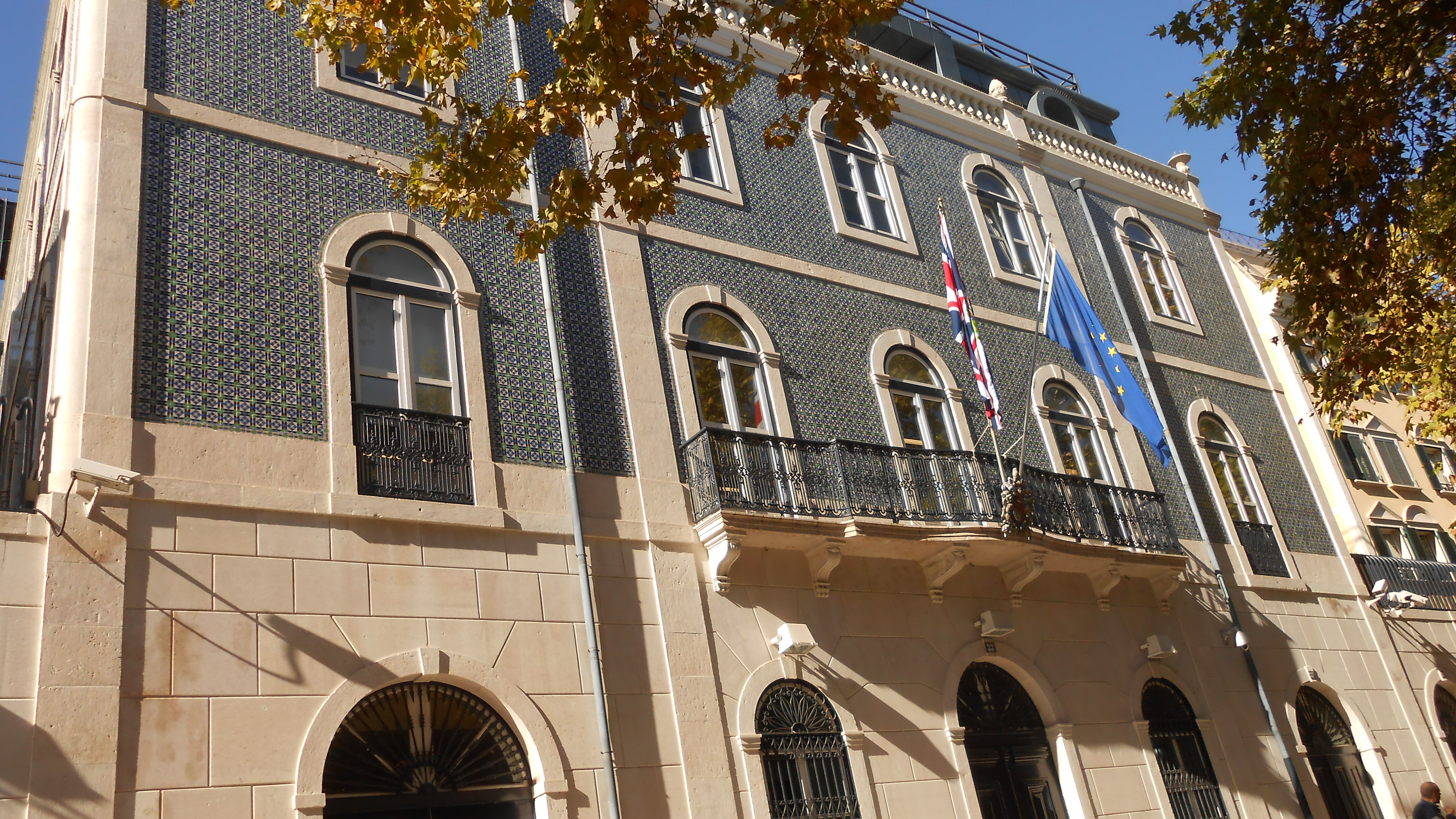
Embassy in Lisbon

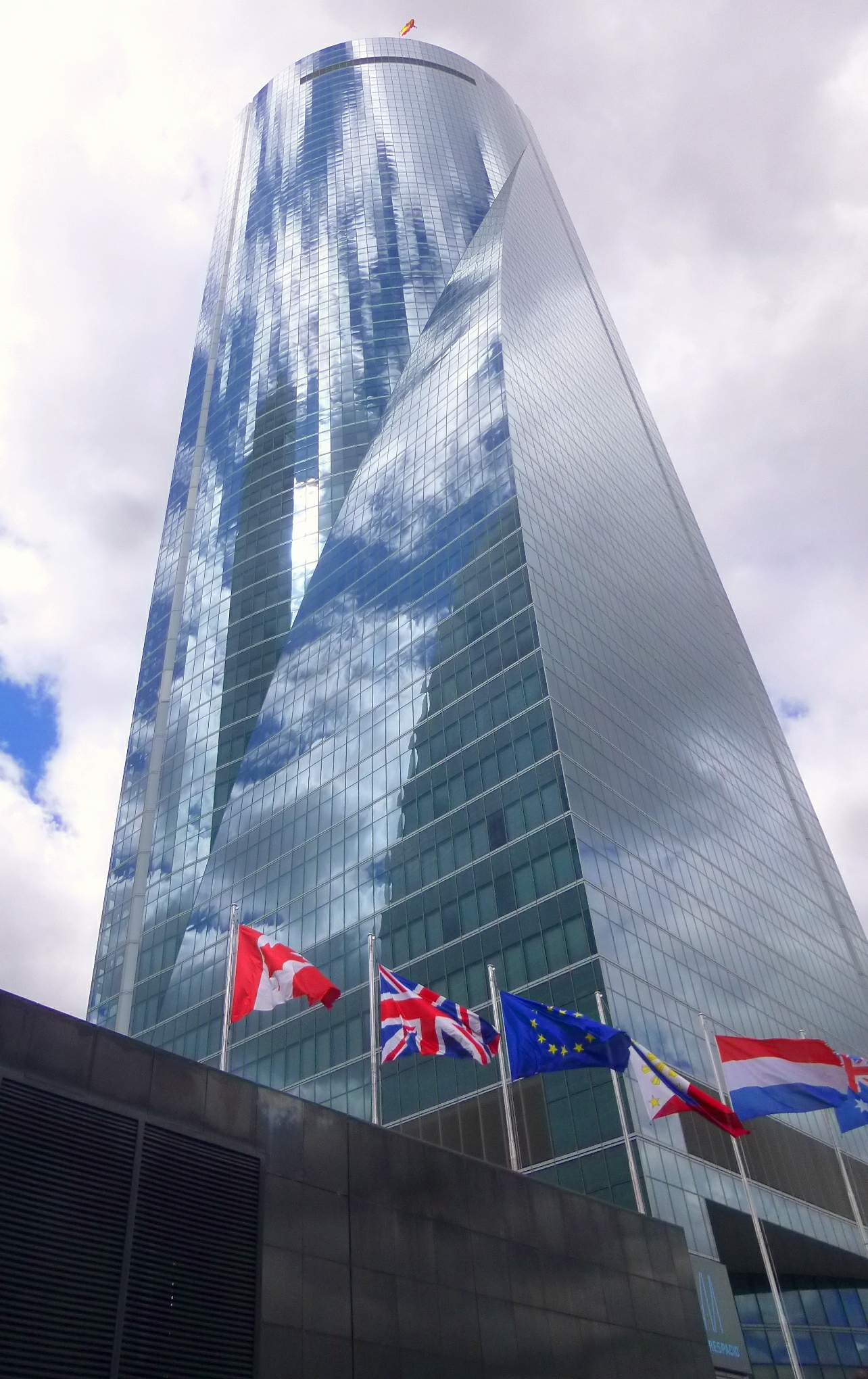
Torre Emperador hosting the Embassy in Madrid

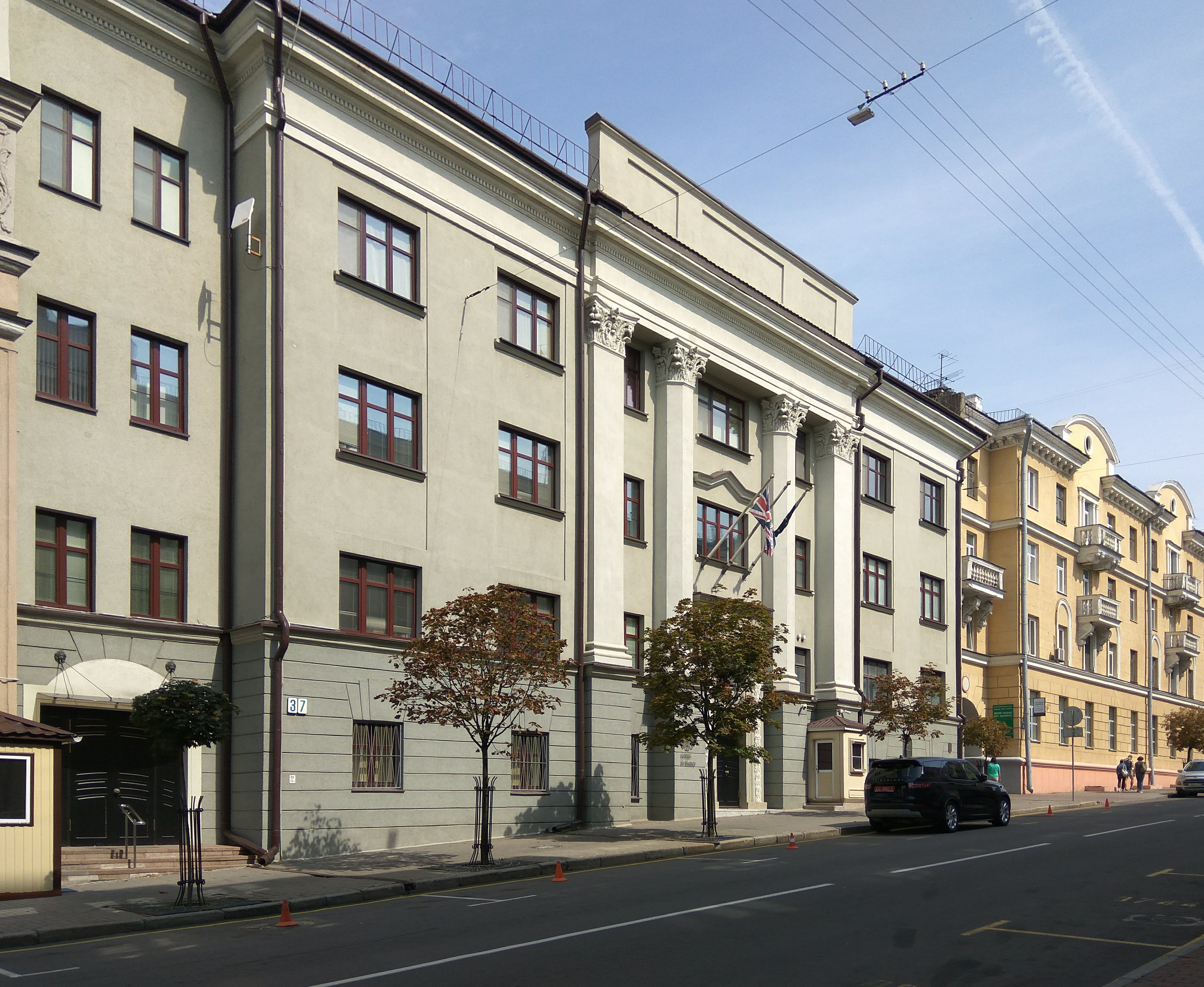
British Embassy in Minsk

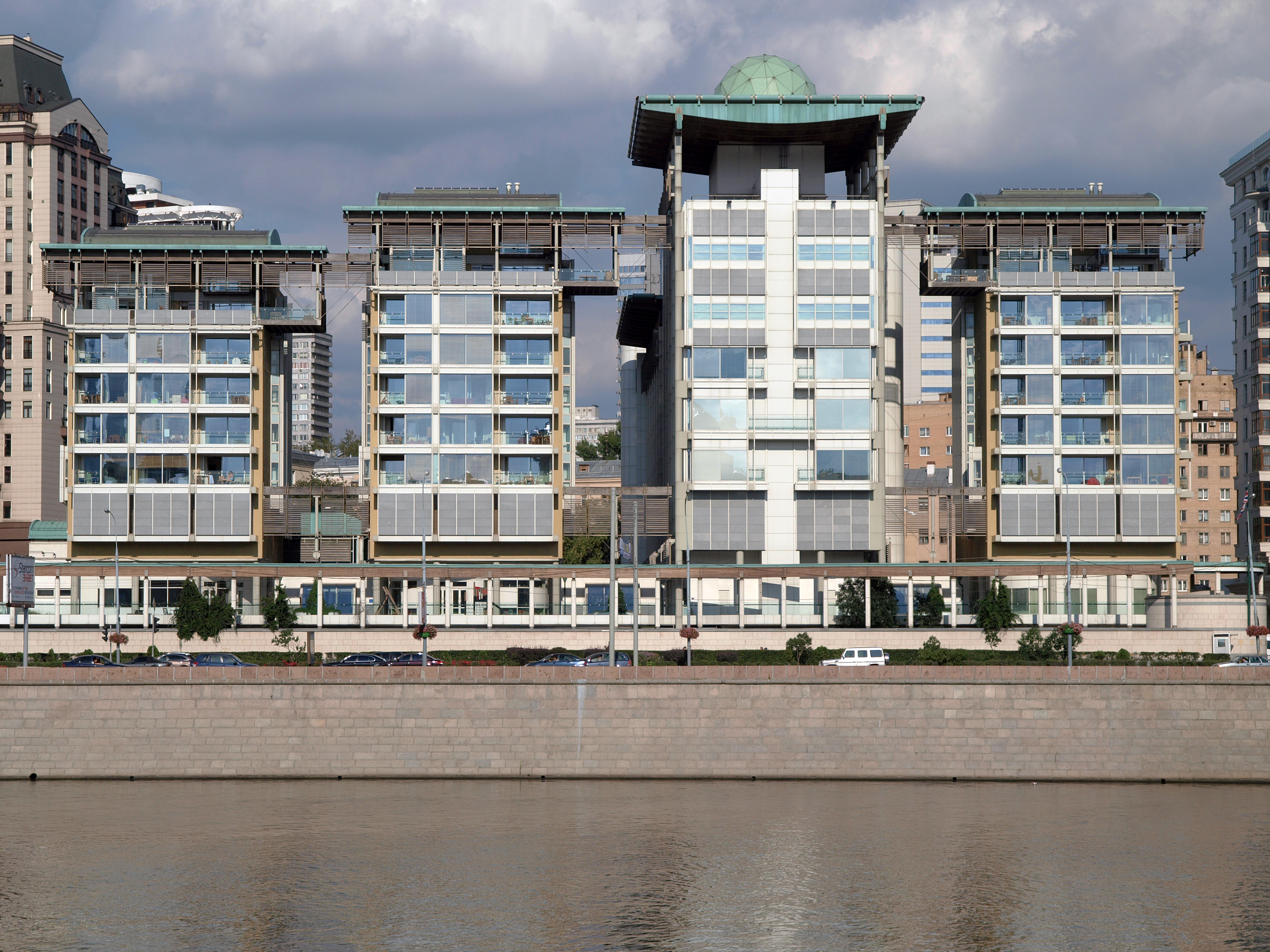
Embassy in Moscow

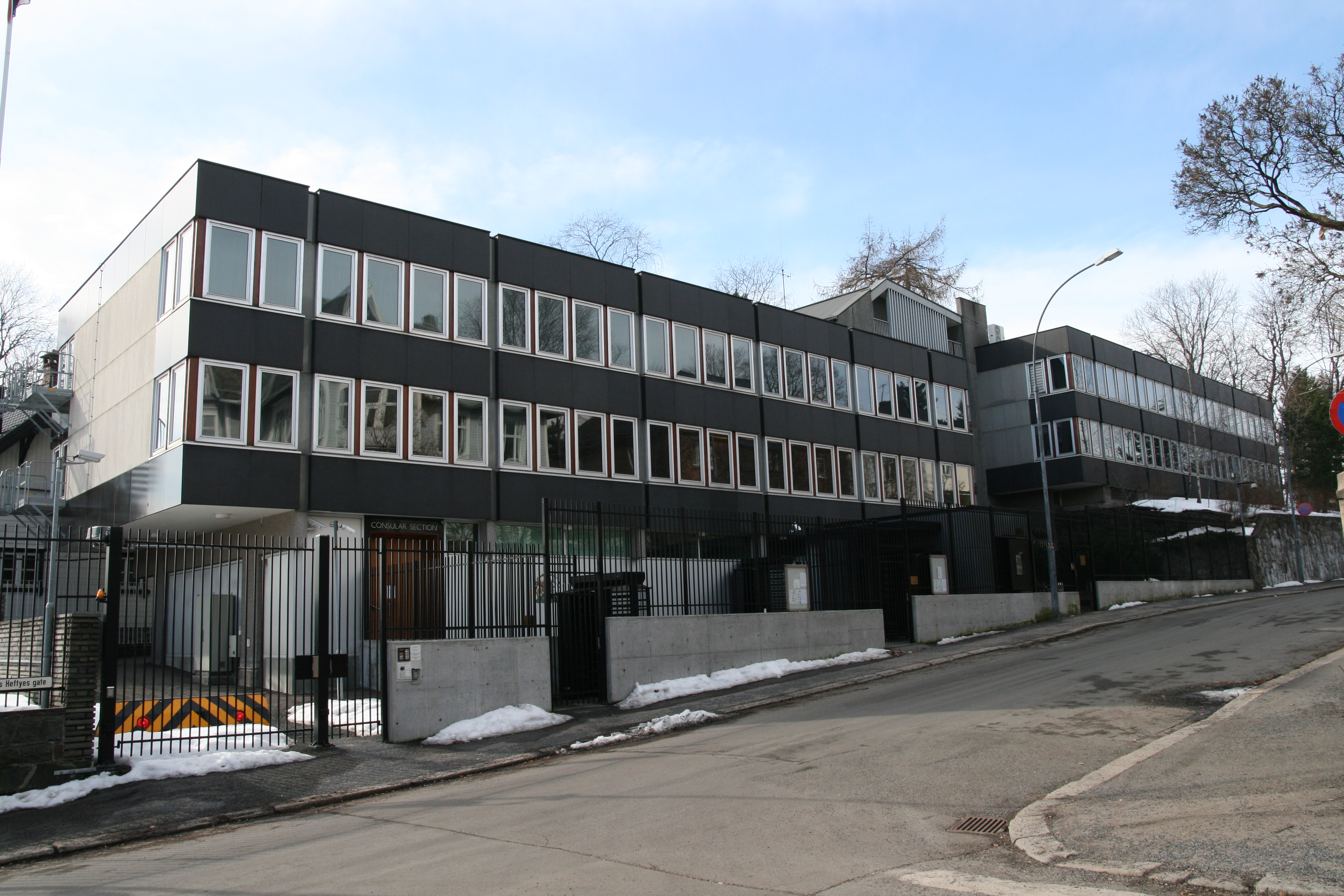
Embassy in Oslo

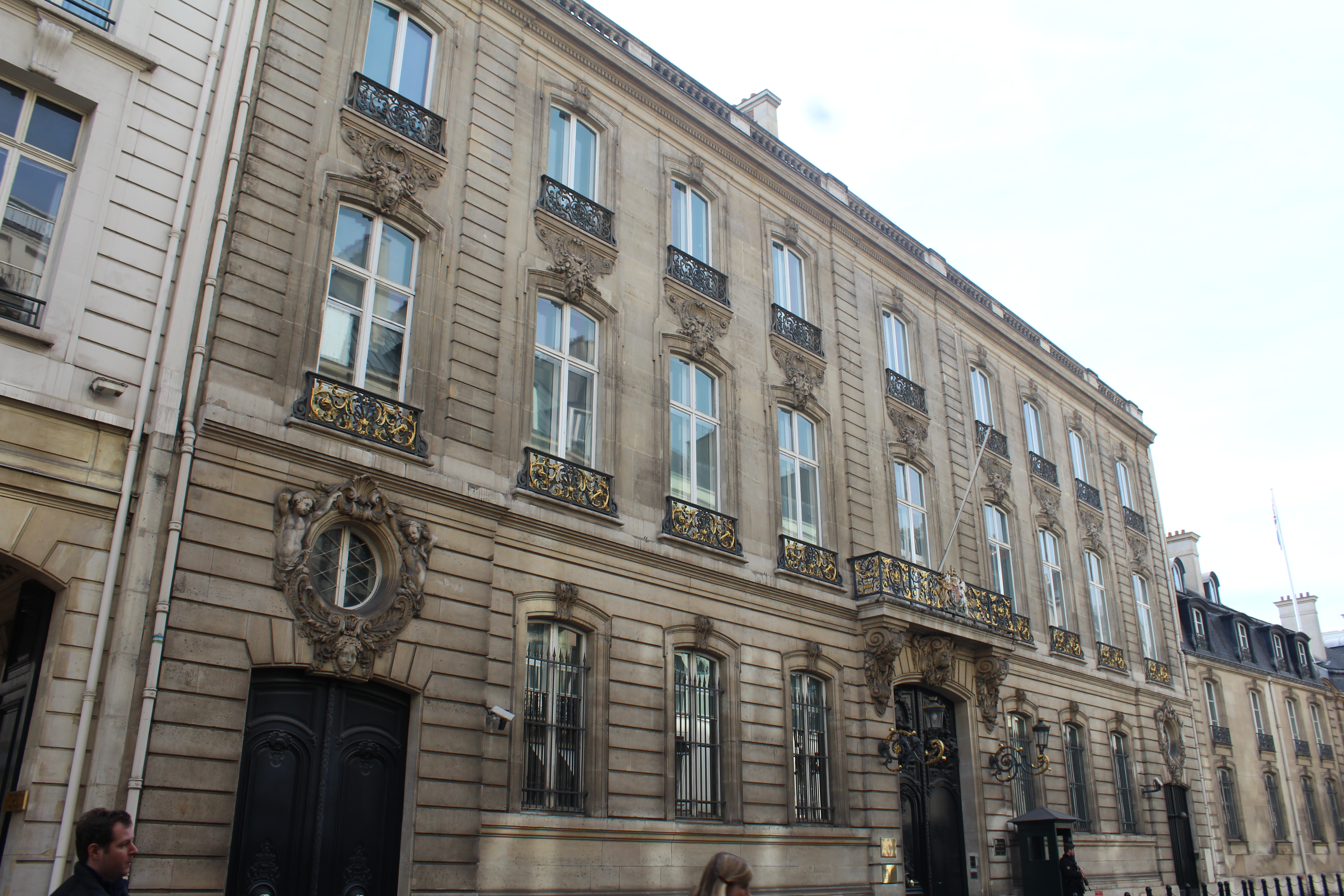
Embassy in Paris

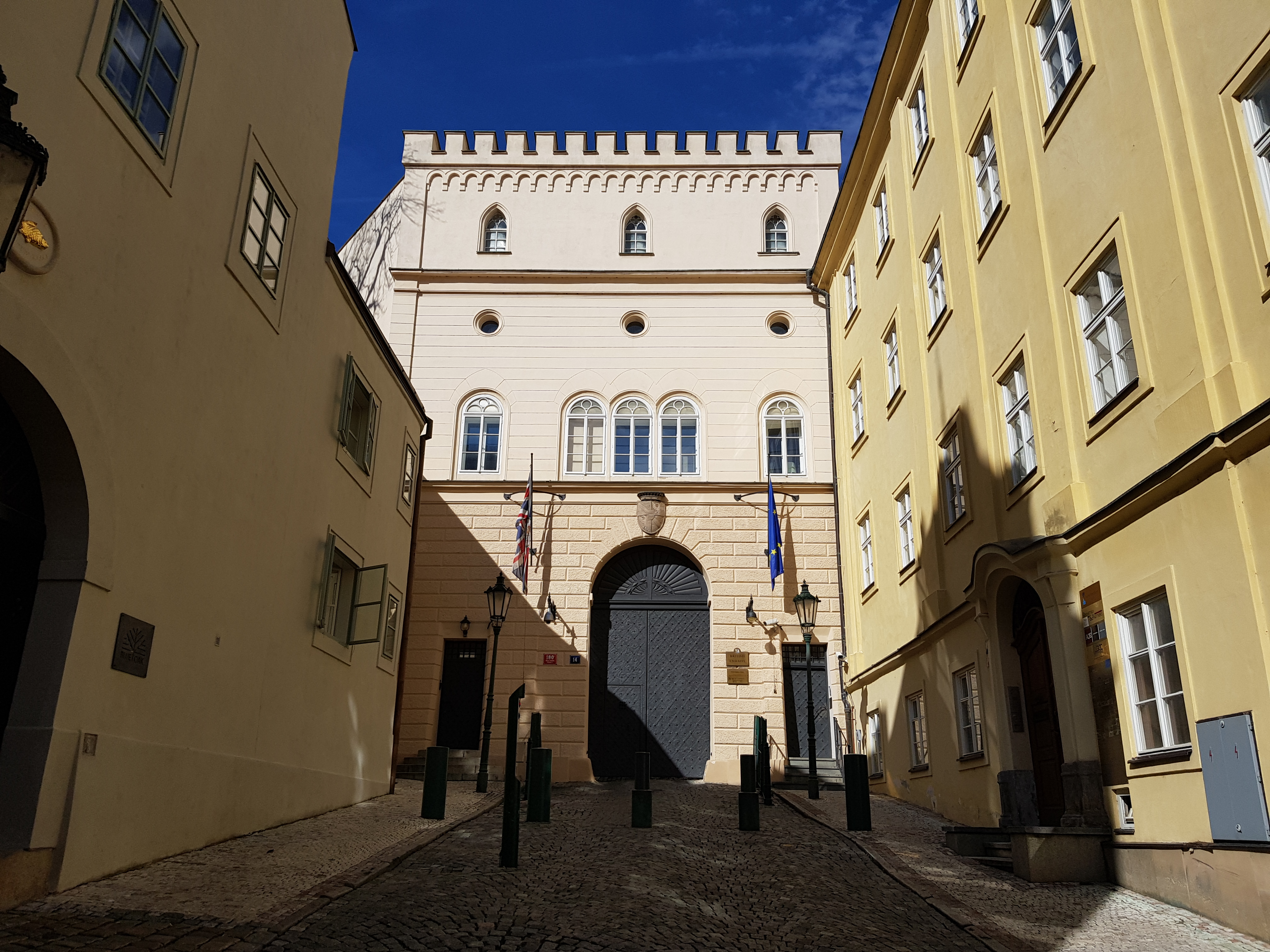
Embassy in Prague

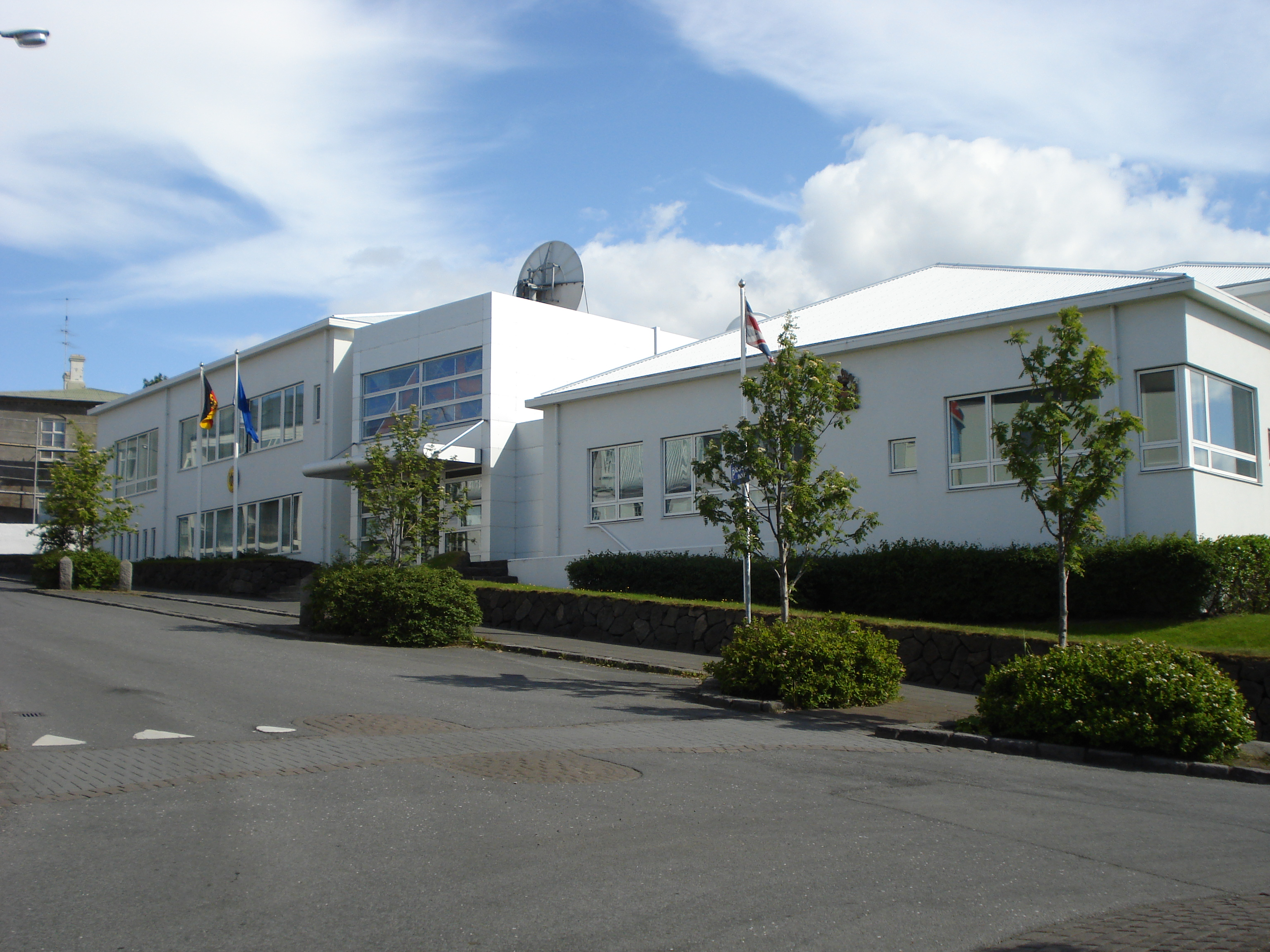
Embassy in Reykjavík

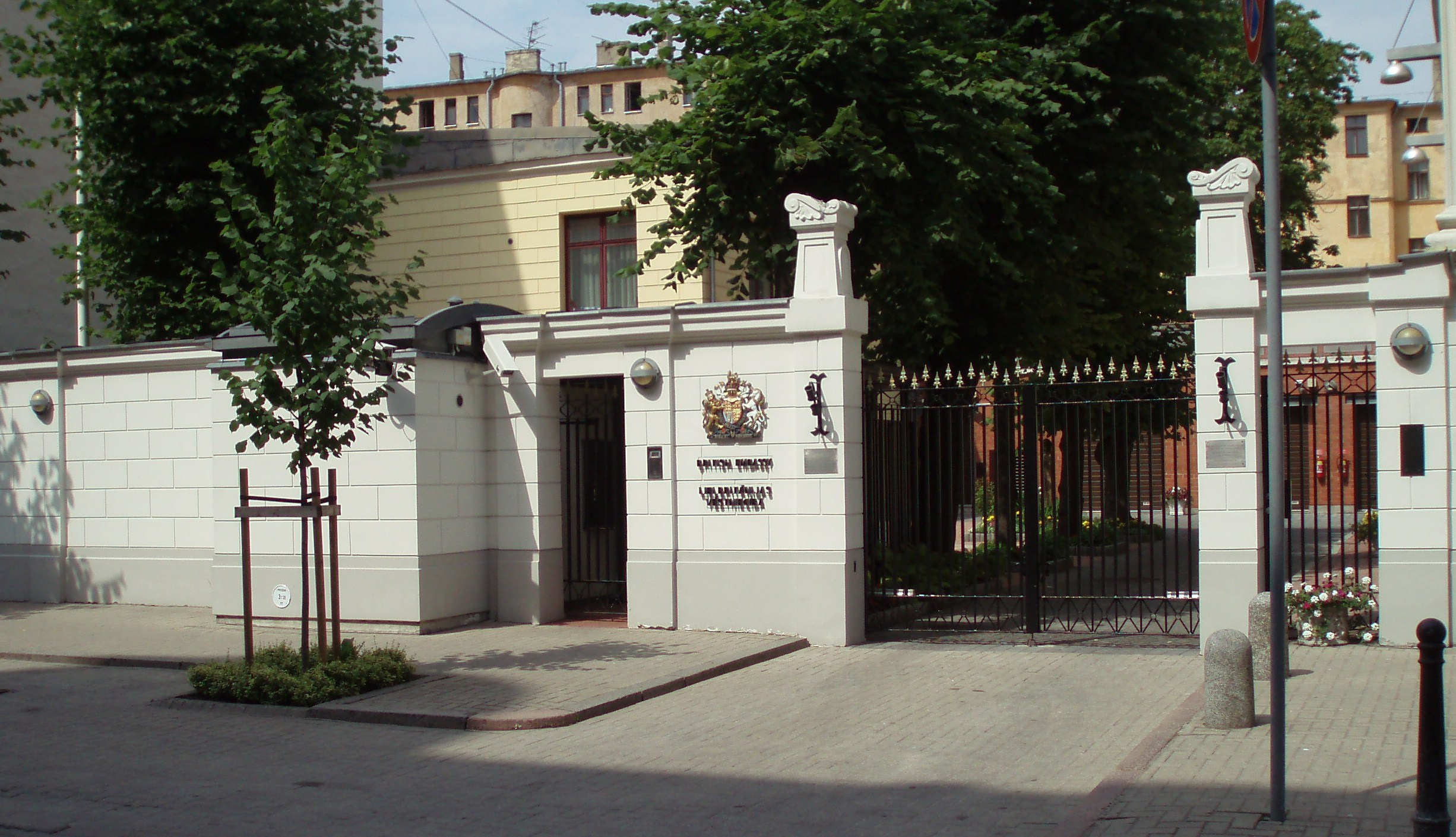
Embassy in Riga

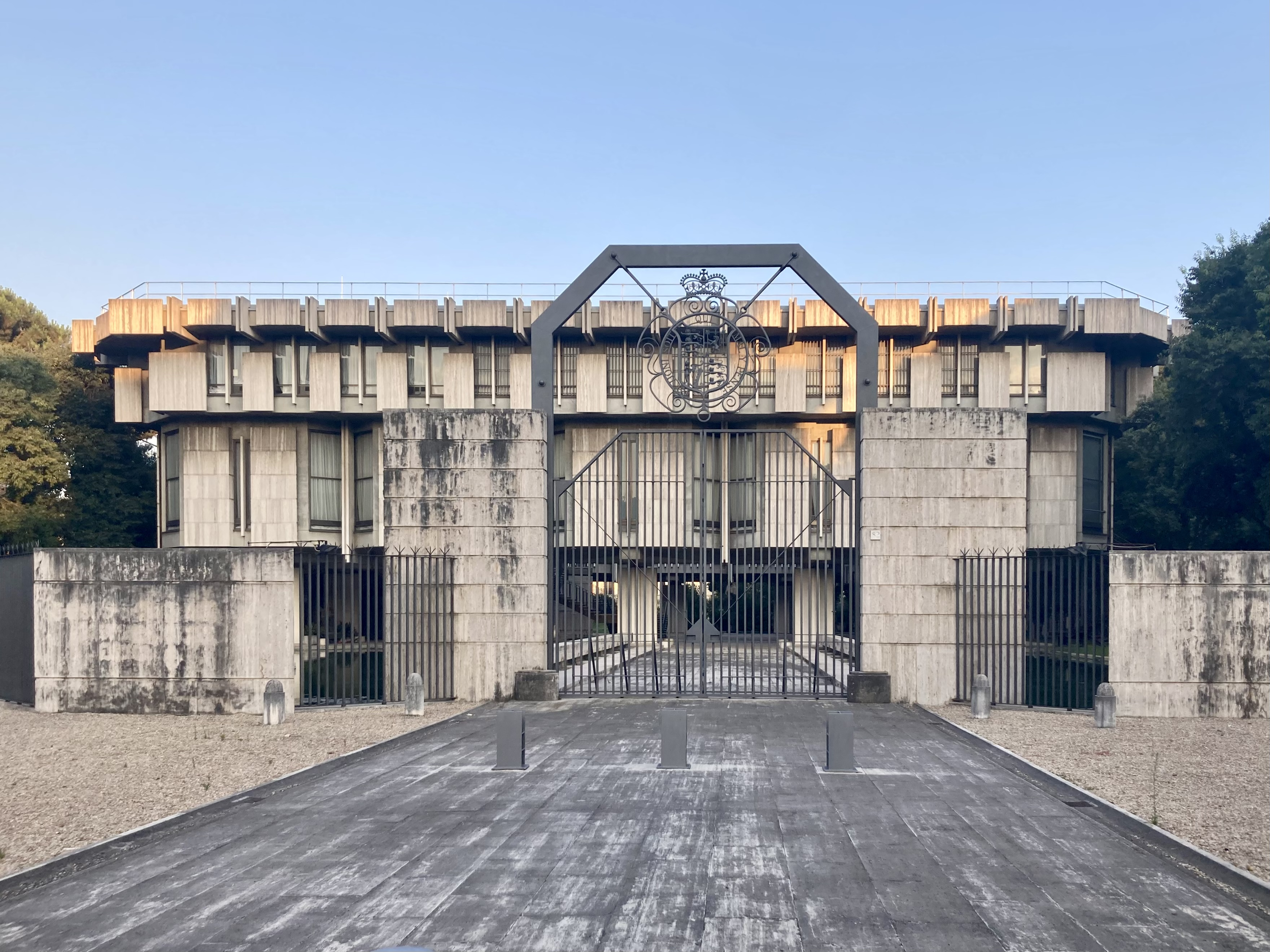
Embassy in Rome

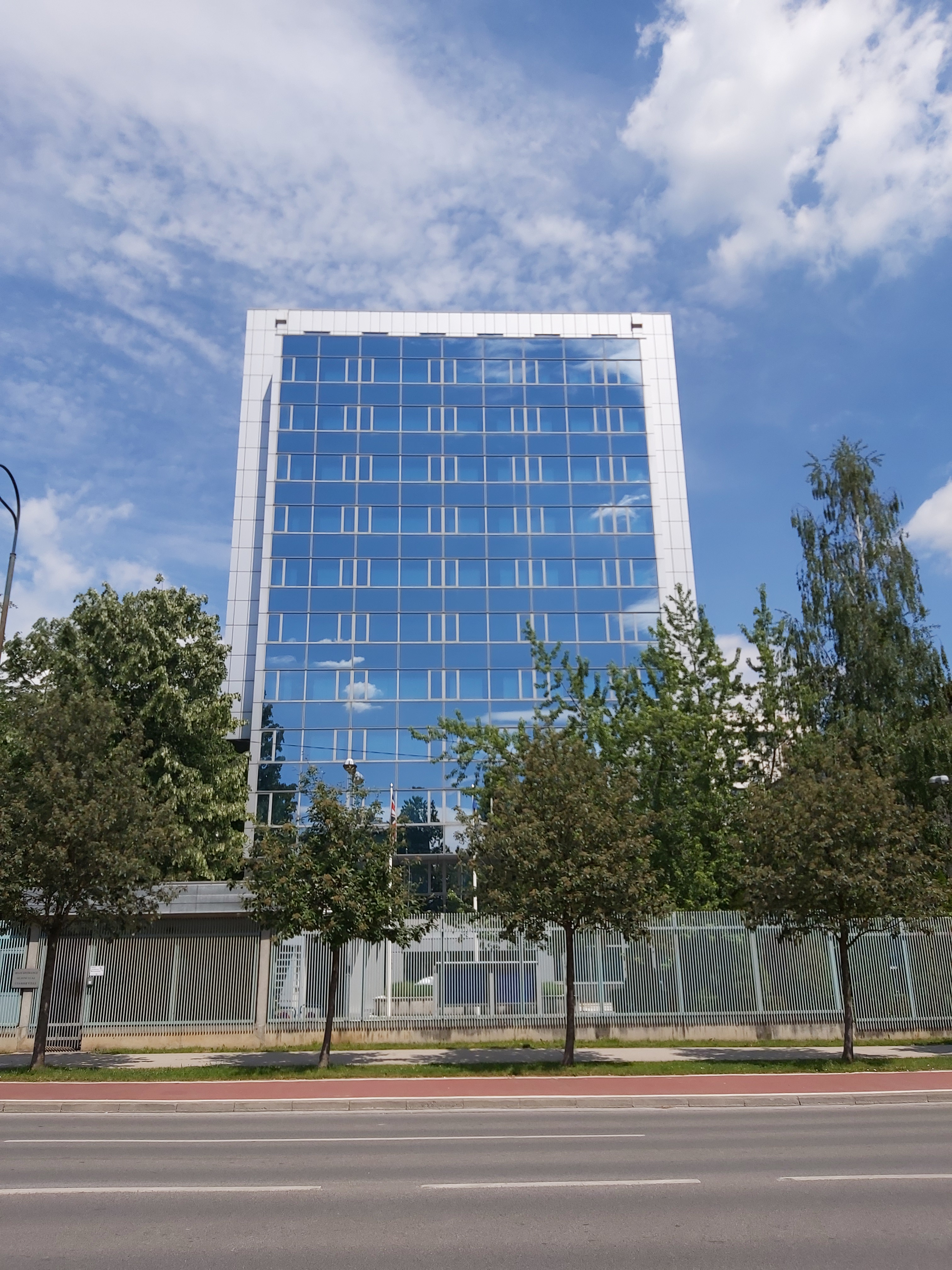
Embassy in Sarajevo

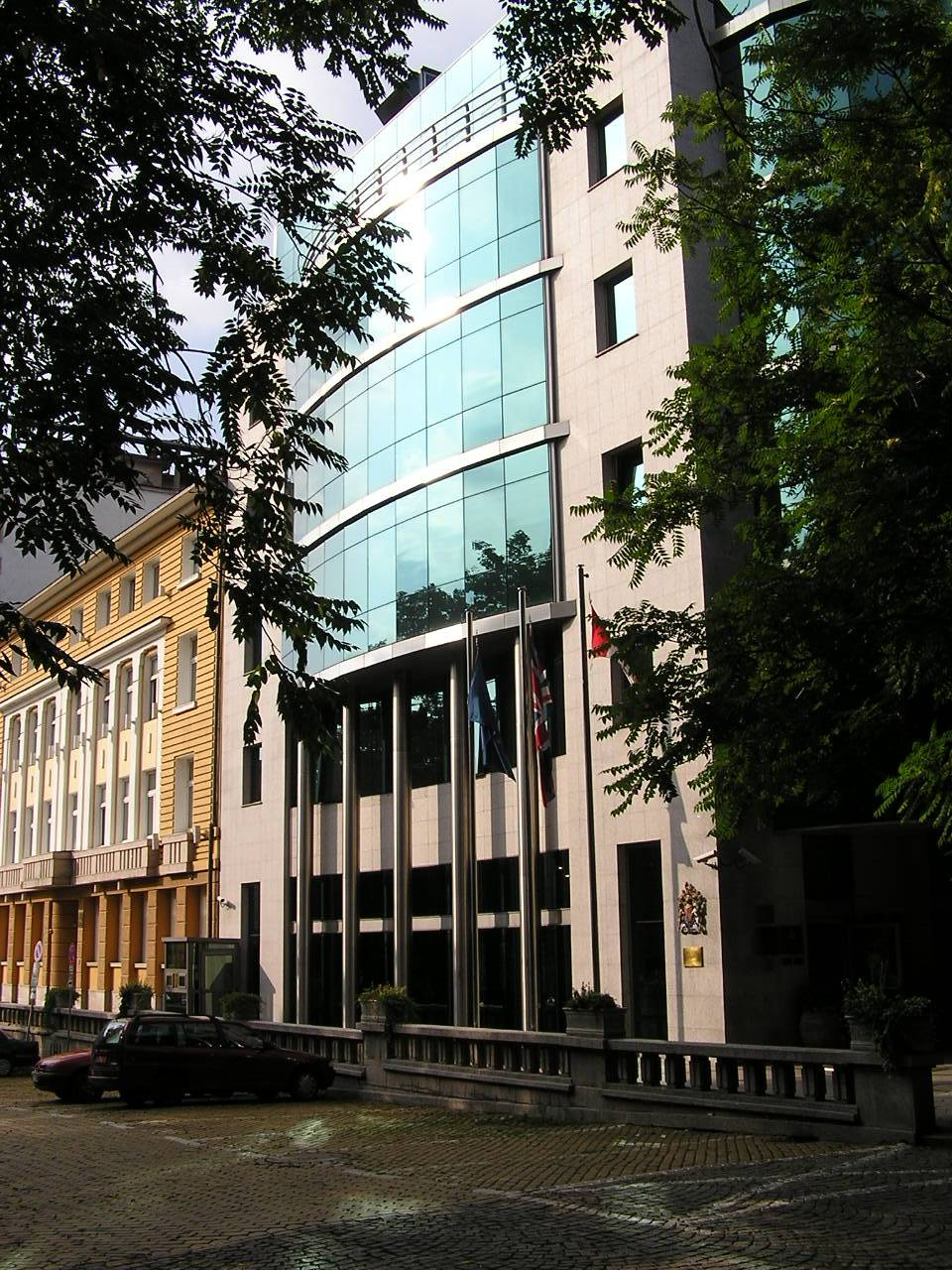
Embassy in Sofia

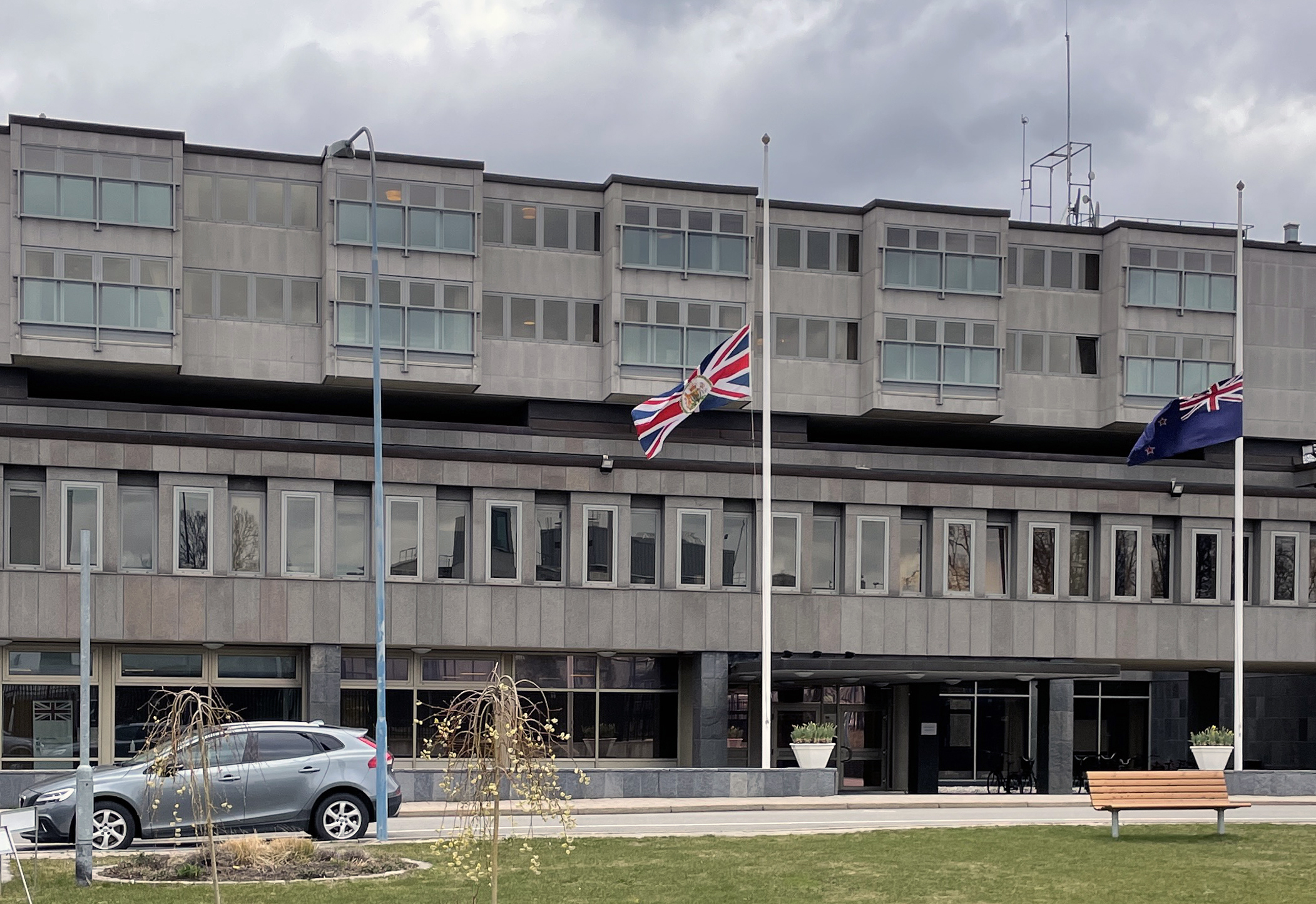
Embassy in Stockholm

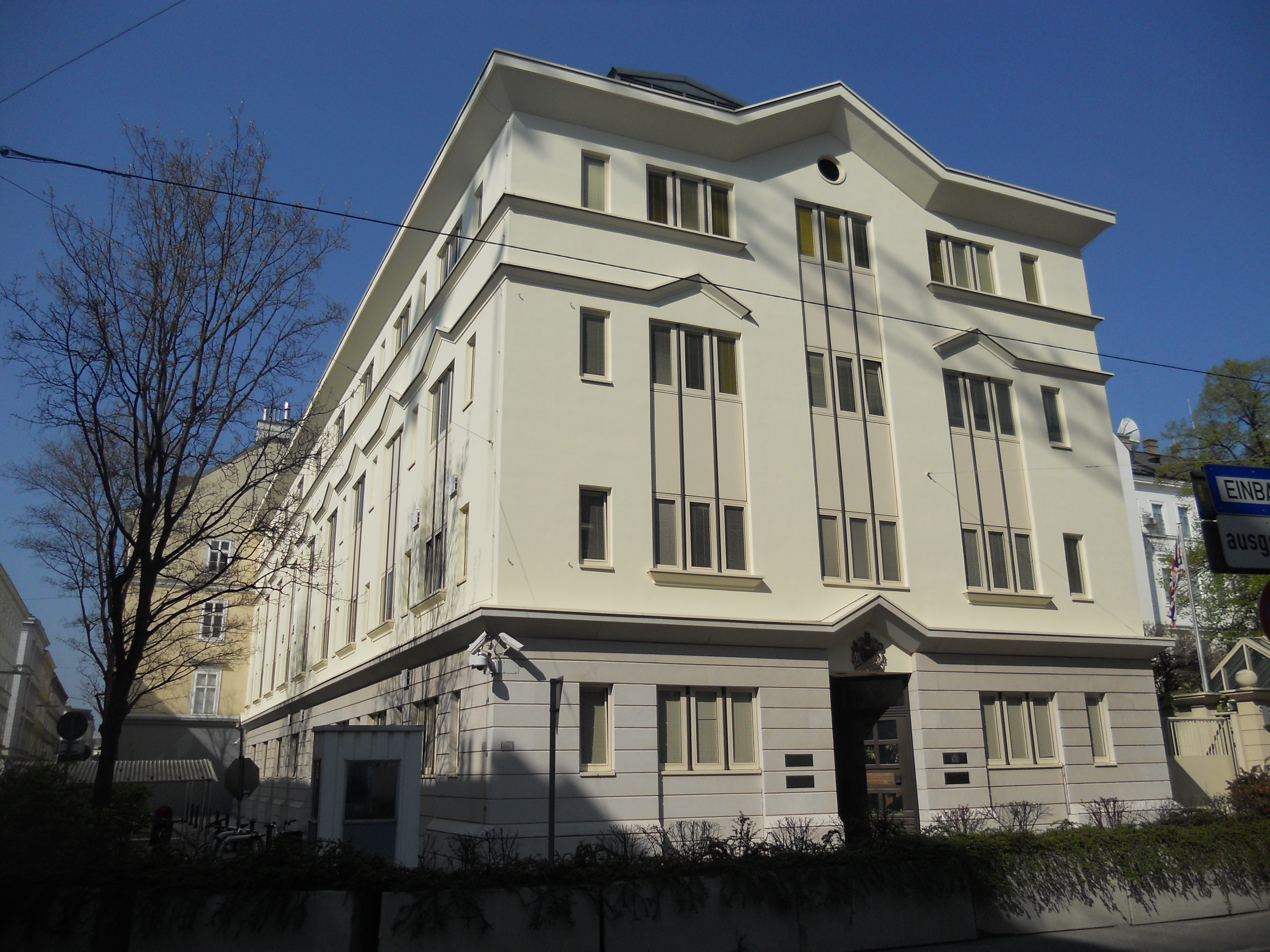
Embassy in Vienna

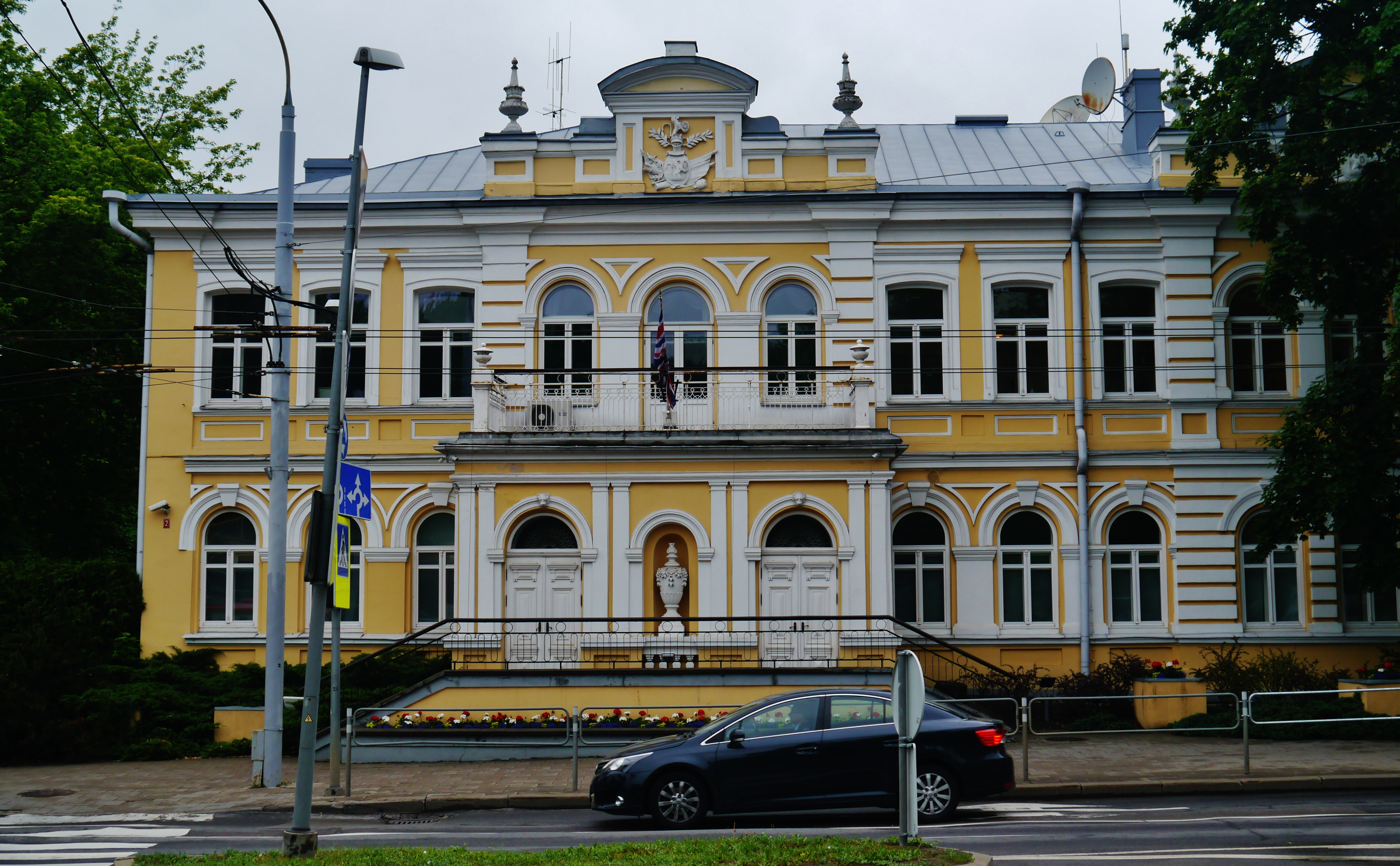
Embassy in Vilnius

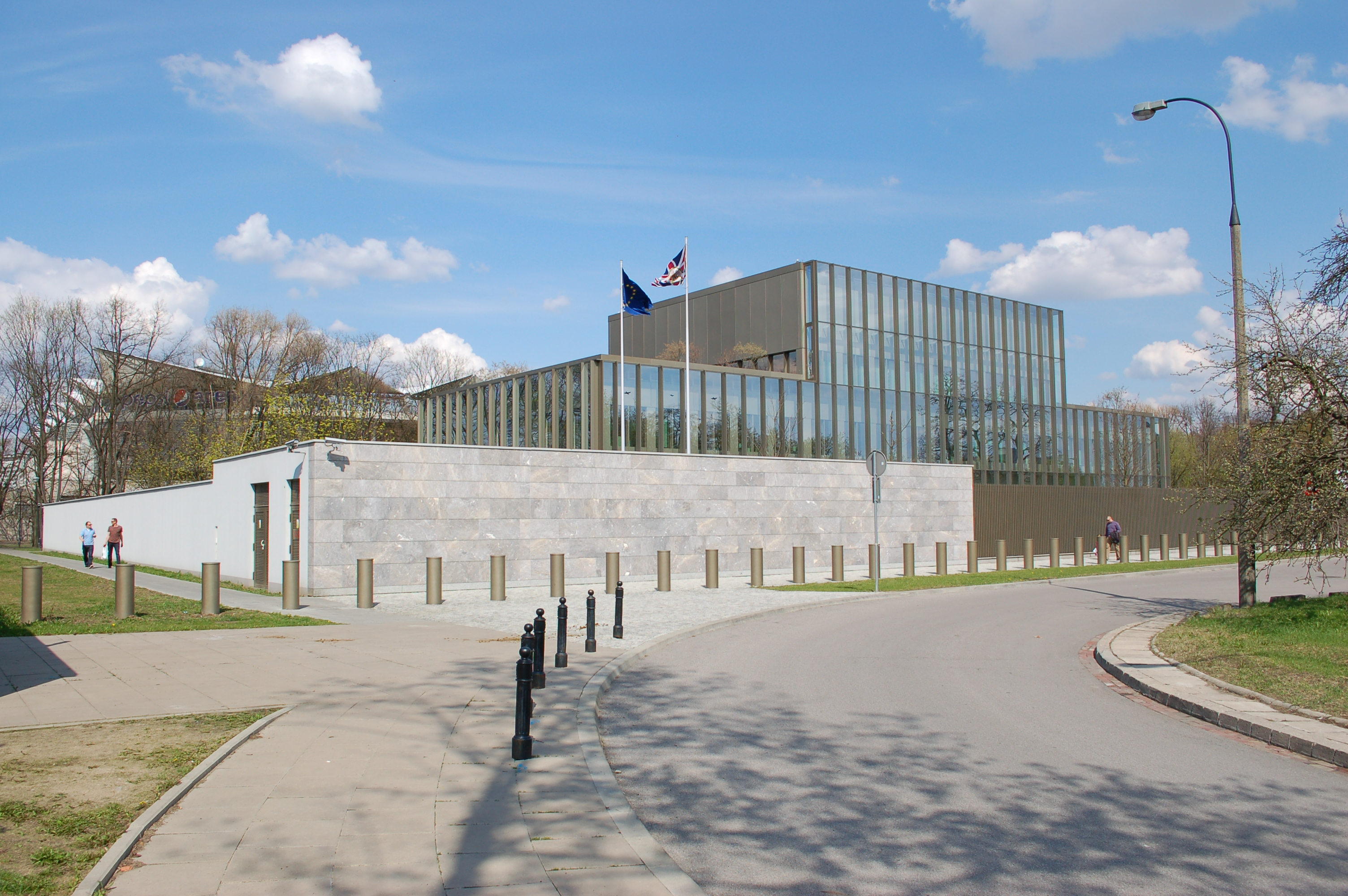
Embassy in Warsaw

=== Oceania ===
| Host country | Host city | Mission | Concurrent accreditation | Ref. |
|---|---|---|---|---|
| Australia | Canberra | High Commission | | |
| Australia | Brisbane | Consulate-General | | |
| Australia | Melbourne | Consulate-General | | |
| Australia | Perth | Consulate-General | | |
| Australia | Sydney | Consulate-General | | |
| Fiji | Suva | High Commission | Countries: Kiribati; Marshall Islands; Micronesia; Tuvalu | |
| New Zealand | Wellington | High Commission | Countries: Cook Islands; Niue | |
| New Zealand | Auckland | Consulate-General | Countries: Cook Islands; Niue | |
| Papua New Guinea | Port Moresby | High Commission | | |
| Samoa | Apia | High Commission | | |
| Solomon Islands | Honiara | High Commission | Country: Nauru | |
| Tonga | Nukuʻalofa | High Commission | | |
| Vanuatu | Port Vila | High Commission | | |

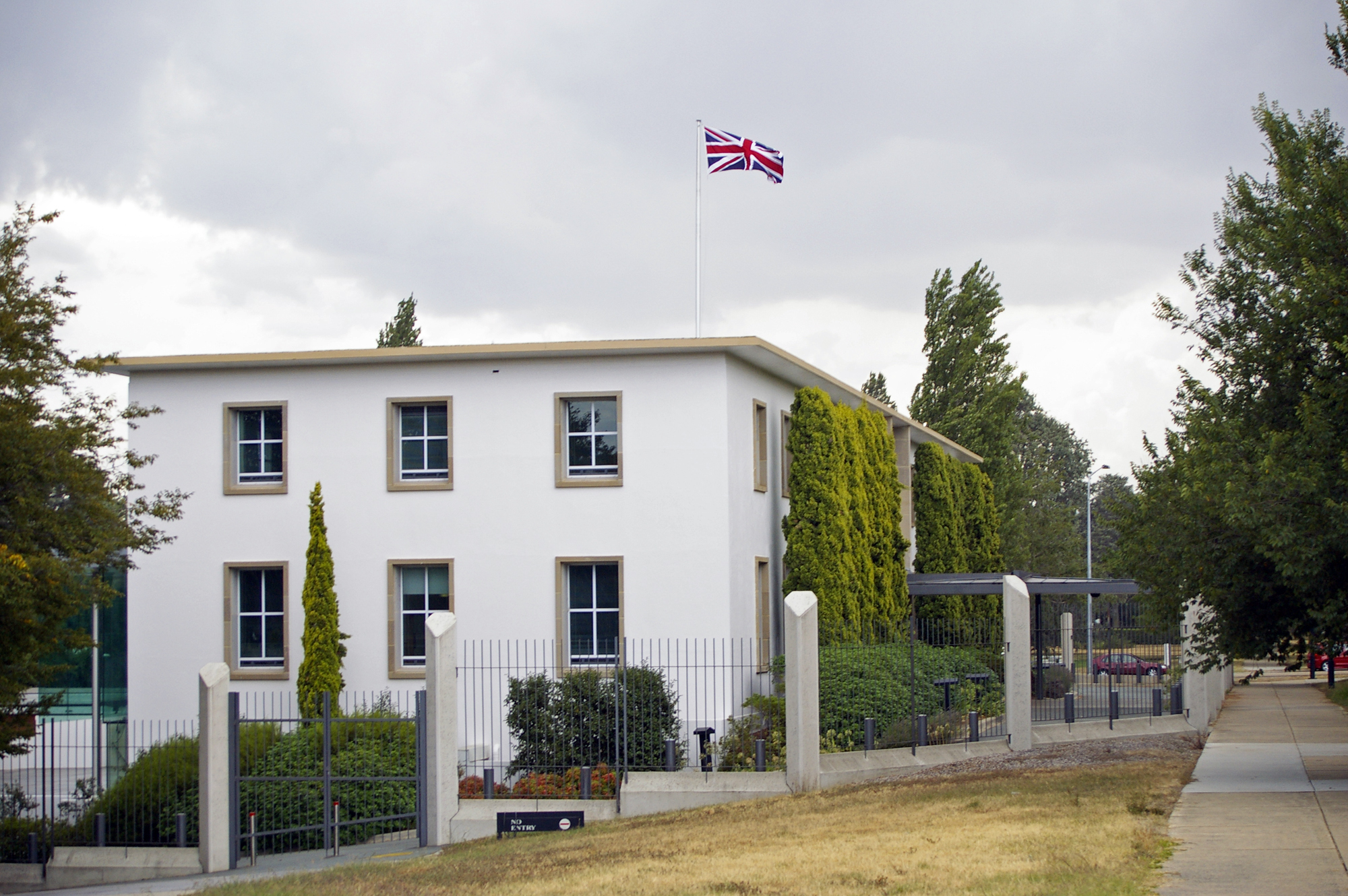
High Commission in Canberra

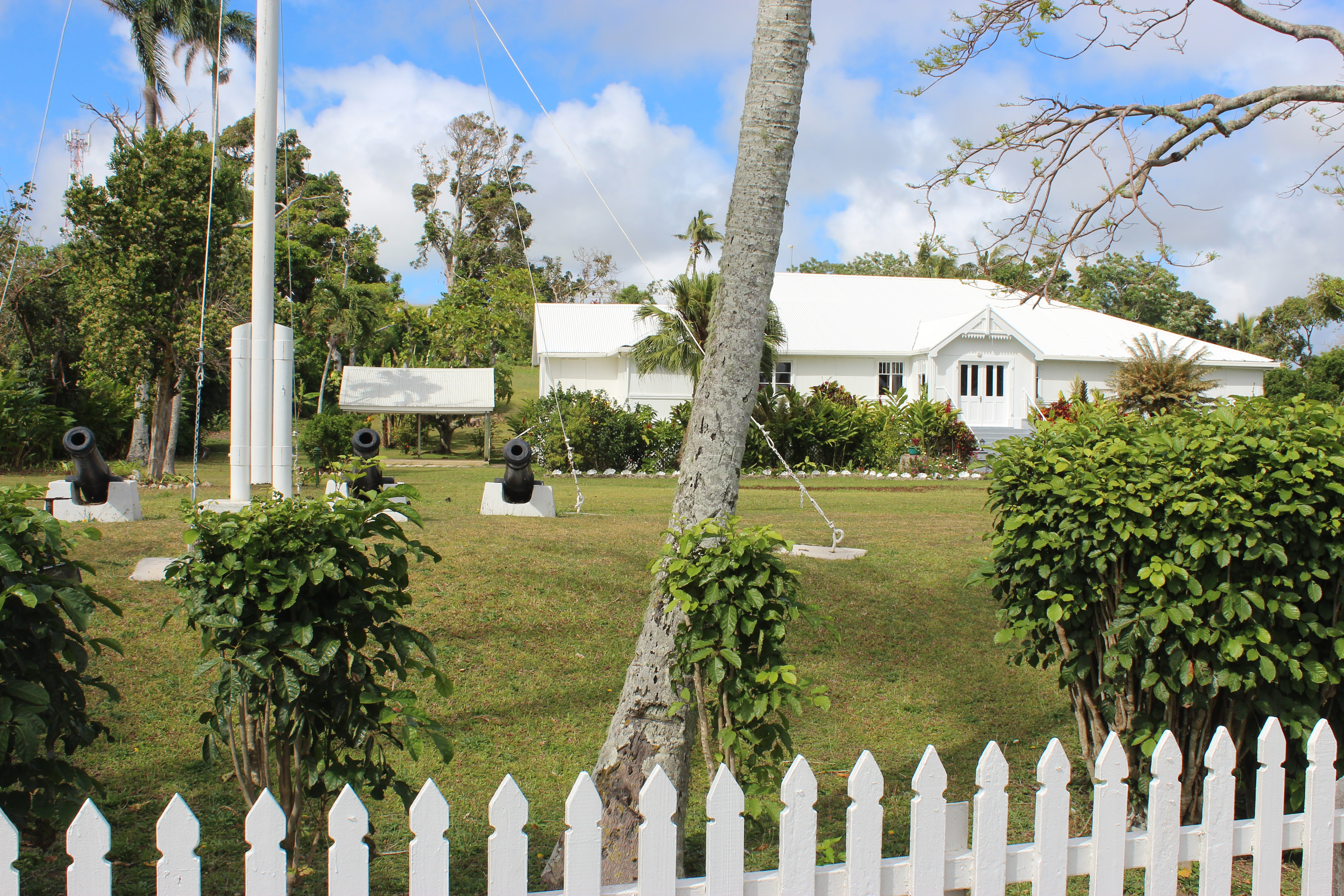
High Commission in Nukuʻalofa

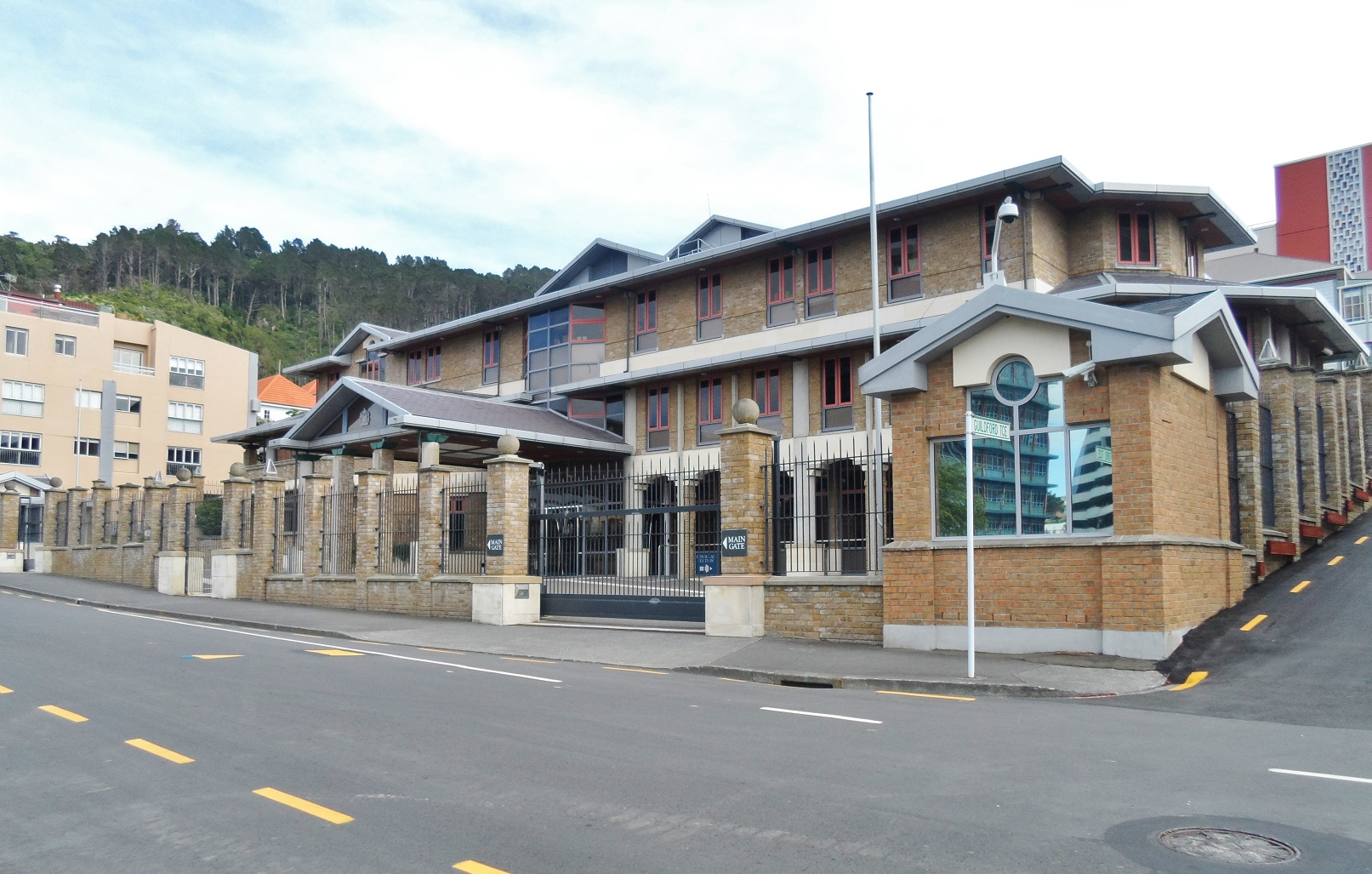
High Commission in Wellington

=== Multilateral organizations ===
| Organization | Host city | Host country | Mission | Concurrent accreditation | Ref. |
|---|---|---|---|---|---|
| Association of Southeast Asian Nations | Jakarta | Indonesia | Delegation | | |
| Council of Europe | Strasbourg | France | Delegation | | |
| European Union | Brussels | Belgium | Mission | | |
| NATO | Brussels | Belgium | Delegation | | |
| Organisation for Economic Co-operation and Development | Paris | France | Delegation | | |
| Organization for Security and Co-operation in Europe | Vienna | Austria | Delegation | | |
| United Nations | New York City | United States | Permanent Mission | | |
| United Nations | Geneva | Switzerland | Permanent Mission | International Organizations: Conference on Disarmament; International Committee of the Red Cross; International Organization for Migration; World Trade Organization | |
| United Nations | Vienna | Austria | Permanent Mission | | |

== Closed missions ==
=== Africa ===
| Host country | Host city | Mission | Year closed | Ref. |
|---|---|---|---|---|
| Cameroon | Douala | Consulate | 2005 | |
| Congo-Brazzaville | Brazzaville | Embassy | 1991/2 | |
| Congo-Kinshasa | Goma | Embassy Office | Unknown | |
| Ethiopia | Harar | Consulate | 1960 | |
| Ethiopia | Mega | Consulate | 1960s | |
| Gabon | Libreville | Embassy | 1991/2 | |
| Libya | Benghazi | Consulate | 2012 | |
| Nigeria | Kaduna | Liaison Office | Unknown | |
| Sudan | Khartoum | Embassy | 2023 | |
| Tanzania | Zanzibar City | Embassy | 1965 | |

=== Americas ===
| Host country | Host city | Mission level | Year closed | Ref. |
|---|---|---|---|---|
| Colombia | Barranquilla | Consulate | 1998 | |
| Colombia | Cali | Consulate | 2014 | |
| Colombia | Cartagena | Consulate | 2014 | |
| Honduras | Tegucigalpa | Embassy (Note: Resident in Guatemala City, Guatemala) | 2003 | |
| Nicaragua | Managua | Embassy (Note: Resident in San José, Costa Rica) | 2003 | |
| United States | Cleveland | Consulate | 1999 | |
| United States | Dallas | Consulate | 2005 | |
| United States | Orlando | Consulate | 2014 | |
| United States | San Juan, Puerto Rico | Consulate | 2005 | |

=== Asia ===
| Host country | Host city | Mission | Year closed | Ref. |
|---|---|---|---|---|
| Afghanistan | Kabul | Embassy | 2021 | |
| East Timor | Dili | Embassy (Note: Resident in Jakarta, Daerah Khusus Ibukota, Indonesia) | 2007 | |
| Iraq | Basra | Consulate | 2012 | |
| Japan | Fukuoka | Consulate | 2006 | |
| Japan | Nagoya | Consulate | 2007 | |
| Japan | Yokohama | Consulate | 1972 | |
| Empire of Japan | Hakodate | Consulate | 1934 | |
| Empire of Japan | Shimonoseki | Consulate | 1940 | |
| Malaysia | Kuching | Consulate General | 1999 | |
| Republic of China | Kashgar | Consulate-General | 1948 | |
| Republic of China | Taipei County | Consulate | 1972 | |
| South Vietnam (Note: The embassy closed down on 24 April 1975, in the midst of the Fall of Saigon, which marked the end of the Vietnam War and the start of a transition period to the formal reunification of Vietnam.) | Saigon | Embassy (Note: Now continues as a consulate-general in Ho Chi Minh, Vietnam.) | 1975 | |
| Syria | Damascus | Embassy (Note: To be reopened.) | 2012 | |
| Thailand | Chiang Mai | Consulate | 1999 | |
| Thailand | Pattaya | Consulate | 2012 | |
| Yemen | Sana'a | Embassy | 2015 | |
| Yemen | Aden | Consulate-General | 2005 | |

=== Europe ===
| Host country | Host city | Mission | Year closed | Ref. |
|---|---|---|---|---|
| France | Calais | Consulate | 1980 | |
| France | Lille | Consulate-General | 2011 | |
| France | Lyon | Consulate-General | 2012 | |
| Germany | Bonn | Embassy branch office | 2002 | |
| Germany | Frankfurt | Consulate General | 2005 | |
| Germany | Hamburg | Consulate General | 2006 | |
| Germany | Leipzig | Consulate General | 2005 | |
| Germany | Stuttgart | Consulate General | 2006 | |
| Italy | Florence | Consulate | 2011 | |
| Italy | Naples | Consulate | 2012 | |
| Italy | Turin | Consulate | 2006 | |
| Italy | Venice | Consulate-General | 2011 | |
| Greece | Thessaloniki | Consular office | 2013 | |
| Portugal | Funchal | Consulate | 2012 | |
| Portugal | Porto | Consular office | 2012 | |
| Russia | Saint Petersburg | Consulate General | 2018 | |
| Spain | Seville | Consulate | 2001 | |
| Sweden | Gothenburg | Consulate-General | 2006 | |
| Switzerland | Geneva | Consulate-General | 2010 | |
| Switzerland | Zürich | Consulate-General | 1998 | |

=== Oceania ===
| Host country | Host city | Mission | Year closed | Ref. |
|---|---|---|---|---|
| Australia | Adelaide | Consulate | 2006 | |
| Kiribati | Tarawa | High Commission (Note: Resident in Suva, Reva Province, Central Division, Fiji) | 1994 | |

== Flags ==
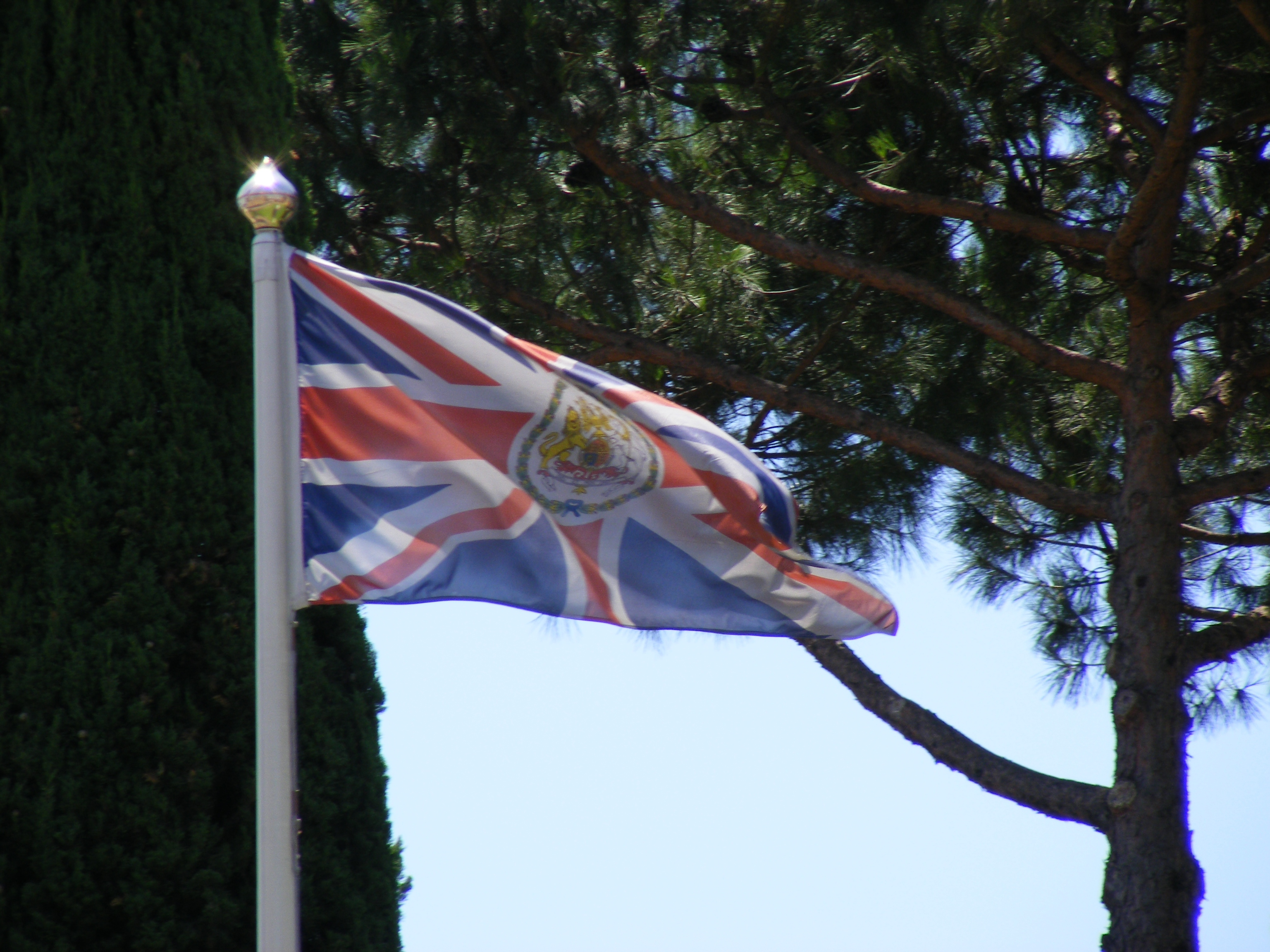
Flag used on British Embassies (pictured in Rome).

The United Kingdom is one of two countries, the other being Thailand, that use diplomatic flags abroad. These special flags are flown at the chanceries of their embassies and consulates. For High Commissions, the Union Flag is used. In addition, there is a flag in use for British consular vessels in international or foreign waters.

| Flag | Use | Description |
|---|---|---|
| | Flag used by Embassies | A Union Flag defaced with the Royal coat of arms of the United Kingdom |
| | Flag used by High Commissions | A Union Flag |
| | Flag used by Consulates and Consulates-General | A Union Flag defaced with the St Edward’s Crown |
| | Flag used by Consular officials onboard vessels | A Blue Ensign with the Royal coat of arms of the United Kingdom |

== See also ==
- Foreign and Commonwealth Office
- Foreign relations of the United Kingdom
- List of heads of missions of the United Kingdom
- List of diplomatic missions in the United Kingdom
- Representations of the Scottish, Welsh, and Northern Irish devolved governments abroad
