= List of settlements in Zakynthos =

Settlements

This is a list of settlements in Zakynthos, Greece.

- Agalas
- Agia Marina
- Agioi Pantes
- Agios Dimitrios
- Agios Kirykos
- Agios Leontas
- Alikanas
- Ampelokipoi
- Anafonitria
- Ano Gerakari
- Ano Volimes
- Argasi
- Bochali
- Exo Chora
- Fiolitis
- Gaitani
- Galaro
- Gyri
- Kalamaki
- Kalipado
- Kallithea
- Katastari
- Kato Gerakari
- Keri
- Koiliomenos
- Korithi
- Kypseli
- Lagkadakia
- Lagopodo
- Lithakia
- Loucha
- Machairado
- Maries
- Meso Gerakari
- Mouzaki
- Orthonies
- Pantokratoras
- Pigadakia
- Planos
- Romiri
- Sarakinado
- Skoulikado
- Tragaki
- Vanato
- Vasilikos
- Volimes
- Vougiato
- Zakynthos (city)

== See also ==
- List of towns and villages in Greece
