= Korithi =

Korithi Κόριθι
- Settlement
- Location within Greece
- Coordinates: 37°55′00″N 20°41′58″E
- Country: Greece
- Administrative region: Ionian Islands
- Regional unit: Zakynthos
- Municipality: Zakynthos
- Municipal unit: Elatia
- Community: Volimes
- Elevation: 169 m (554 ft)

Population (2021)
  - Total: 39
- Time zone: UTC+2 (EET)
  - Summer (DST): UTC+3 (EEST)

Korithi (Greek: Κόριθι) is a settlement near the northwestern tip of the island of Zakynthos, Greece. It is located around 9 kilometers northeast of Volimes, 2 kilometers north of Agios Nikolaos and 41 kilometers northwest of Zakynthos City. Population 39 (2021).
