= Ampelokipoi, Zakynthos =

Ampelokipoi Αμπελόκηποι
- Community
- Location within Greece
- Coordinates: 37°45′N 20°52′E
- Country: Greece
- Administrative region: Ionian Islands
- Regional unit: Zakynthos
- Municipality: Zakynthos
- Municipal unit: Zakynthos (city)

Population (2021)
  - Community: 2,082
- Time zone: UTC+2 (EET)
  - Summer (DST): UTC+3 (EEST)

Ampelokipoi (Greek: Αμπελόκηποι meaning "vineyard") is a village and a local community in the southern part of the island of Zakynthos. It is part of the municipal unit of Zakynthos (city). The community includes the village Kalpaki. It is 3 km northwest of Kalamaki, 4 km north of Laganas and 3 km southwest of Zakynthos city. The Zakynthos International Airport is 1 km southeast.

== Population ==
Year	Ampelokipoi	Kalpaki	Community
1981	911	-	-
1991	1,064	-	-
2001	1,182	243	1,425
2011	1,606	324	1,930
2021	1,685	397	2,082

== See also ==
- List of settlements in Zakynthos
