= Gyri, Zakynthos =

Gyri Γύρι
- Community
- Location within Greece
- Coordinates: 37°48′N 20°44′E
- Country: Greece
- Administrative region: Ionian Islands
- Regional unit: Zakynthos
- Municipality: Zakynthos
- Municipal unit: Artemisia

Population (2021)
  - Community: 29
- Time zone: UTC+2 (EET)
  - Summer (DST): UTC+3 (EEST)

Gyri (Greek: Γύρι) is a settlement in the municipal unit Artemisia, on Zakynthos island, Greece. It is located northwest of Machairado and 30.5 kilometres (19.0 mi) from Zakynthos City. Its population is 29 (2021 census). Two roads connect the town, one which goes through the neighbouring town of Loucha, and one which comes from Agia Marina. The town consists of a main road which most of the buildings are located on. There is a church, a one-room school house, two taverns and the rest are houses. Its elevation is about 550 metres (1,800 ft).
