= Zakynthos International Airport =

Zakynthos International Airport "Dionysios Solomos" Διεθνής Αερολιμένας Ζακύνθου «Διονύσιος Σολωμός»

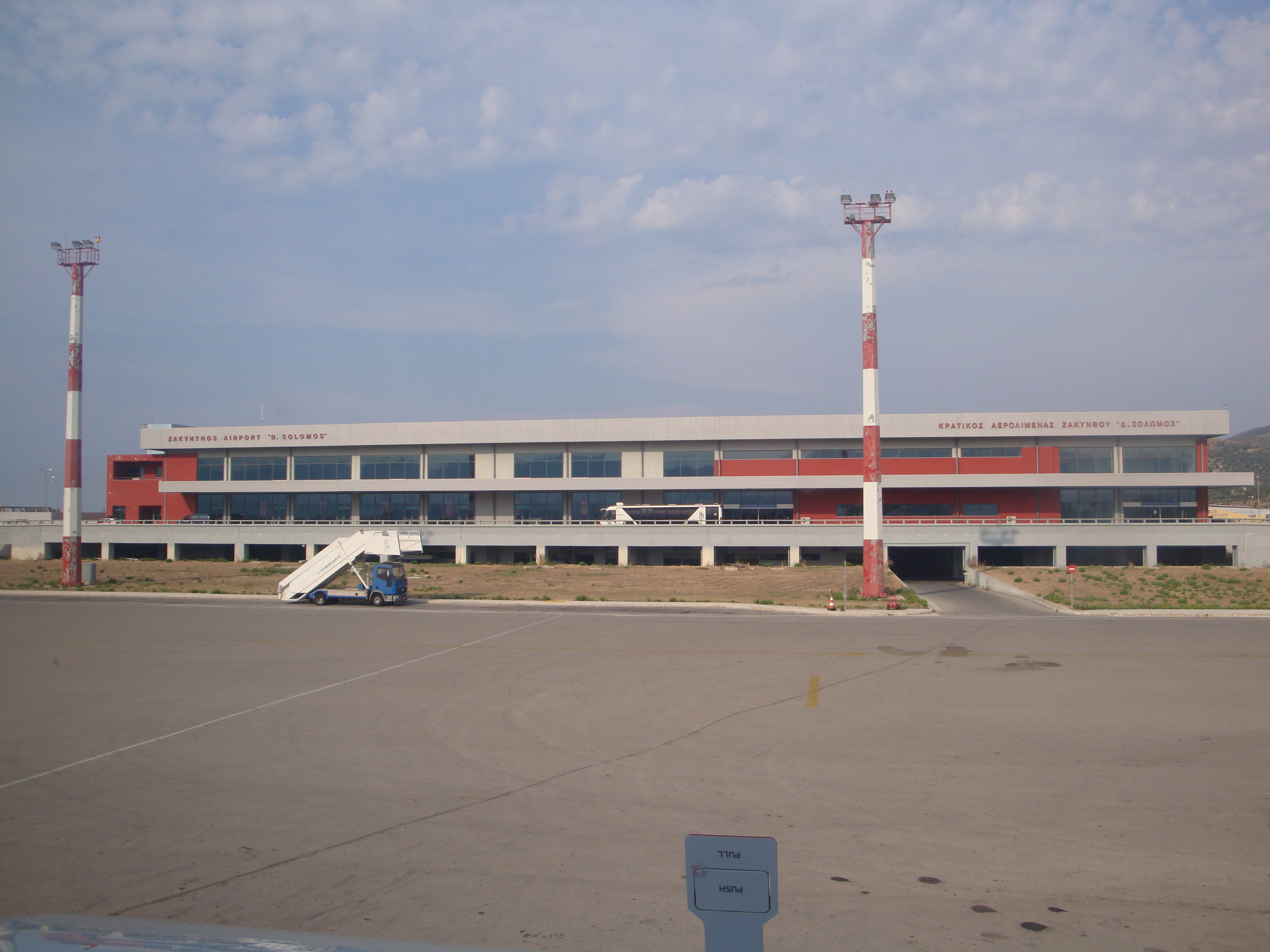
- IATA: ZTH; ICAO: LGZA

Summary
- Airport type: Public
- Owner: Greek state
- Operator: Fraport AG/Copelouzos Group joint venture
- Location: Zakynthos
- Elevation AMSL: 15 ft (4.6 m)
- Coordinates: 37°45′03″N 20°53′03″E
- Website: zth-airport.gr

Map
- Location of airport in Greece

Runways
Direction	Length		Surface
Direction	ft	m	Surface
16/34	7,310	2,228	Asphalt

Statistics (2024)
- Passengers: 2,223,011
- Passenger traffic change: ▲6.8%
- Aircraft movements: 15,127
- Aircraft movements change: ▲4.0%
- Runway Statistics

Zakynthos International Airport "Dionysios Solomos" (IATA: ZTH, ICAO: LGZA) is an airport on the island of Zakynthos, Greece.

It is 4.3 km from Zakynthos city and close to other seaside tourist destinations such as Laganas, Tsilivi and Kalamaki. The main approach into the airport is Runway 34. Aircraft usually have to fly over Laganas bay and make a 180-degree turn, before their final approach over on the Kalamaki beach.

Kalamaki beach is part of the National Marine Park of Zakynthos. During the summer months, endangered Loggerhead sea turtles lay their eggs at the marine park's beaches. This has resulted in aircraft movement restriction;: flights are not permitted to take off or land between 10:00PM to 5:00AM, except under extenuating circumstances.

== History ==
The airport opened in 1972. An expansion of the airport's apron area to 35,100 m^{2} was completed in 2003, and a new 22,150 m^{2} terminal building was completed in 2008.

In December 2015, the privatization of Zakynthos International Airport and 13 other regional airports of Greece was finalized with the signing of the agreement between the Fraport AG/Copelouzos Group joint venture and the state privatisation fund. According to the agreement, the joint venture will operate the 14 airports for 40 years from 11 April 2017.

On 22 March 2017, Fraport presented its master plan for the 14 airports, including Zakynthos. Immediate actions, before the 2017 summer season, included general clean-up of the airports, improved lighting and sanitary facilities, free WiFi and improved fire safety. Specifically for Zakynthos, further improvements were to included the refurbishment and remodeling of the terminal, air traffic control tower and airside pavement; HBS inline screening; a new fire station; relocating power transformers and generators; reorganizing the airport apron area, landside roads and parking; a new security guardhouse; and more check-in counters and security check lanes.

== Airlines and destinations ==
The following airlines operate regular scheduled and charter flights at Zakynthos Airport:

Airlines	Destinations
Aegean Airlines	Seasonal: Athens, Thessaloniki
Air Serbia	Seasonal charter: Belgrade
Animawings	Seasonal: Bucharest–Otopeni, Cluj-Napoca, Timișoara
Austrian Airlines	Seasonal: Vienna
British Airways	Seasonal: London–Heathrow
Brussels Airlines	Seasonal: Brussels
Condor	Seasonal: Frankfurt, Hamburg, Munich
Corendon Dutch Airlines	Seasonal: Amsterdam
Discover Airlines	Seasonal: Frankfurt, Munich
easyJet	Seasonal: Bristol, London–Gatwick, London–Luton, Manchester, Milan–Malpensa, Naples
Edelweiss Air	Seasonal: Zurich
Enter Air	Seasonal: Gdańsk, Katowice, Lodz, Poznań, Warsaw Chopin, Wrocław
Eurowings	Seasonal: Berlin, Düsseldorf, Hamburg, Salzburg, Stuttgart
Finnair	Seasonal: Helsinki
ITA Airways	Seasonal: Rome-Fiumicino
Jet2.com	Seasonal: Belfast–International, Birmingham, Bournemouth, Bristol, East Midlands, Edinburgh, Glasgow, Leeds/Bradford, Liverpool, London–Gatwick, London–Luton, London–Stansted, Manchester, Newcastle upon Tyne
Jettime	Seasonal: Billund, Copenhagen
Luxair	Seasonal: Luxembourg
LOT	Seasonal: Warsaw Chopin
Norwegian Air Shuttle	Seasonal: Oslo
Olympic Air	Seasonal: Athens, Thessaloniki
Ryanair	Seasonal: Bari, Budapest, Dublin, London–Stansted, Milan Bergamo, Naples, Rome–Fiumicino, Stockholm–Arlanda, Vienna, Warsaw–Modlin
Scandinavian Airlines	Seasonal: Copenhagen, Göteborg, Stockholm
Sky Express	Athens, Corfu, Kefalonia, Preveza/Lefkada
SkyUp Airlines	Seasonal: Chișinău
Smartwings	Seasonal: Bratislava, Brno, Budapest, Kosice, Ostrava, Prague
Swiss International Air Lines	Seasonal: Geneva
Transavia	Seasonal: Amsterdam, Brussels, Eindhoven, Paris Orly
TUI Airways	Seasonal: Birmingham, Bournemouth, Bristol, Cardiff, East Midlands, Exeter, Glasgow, London–Gatwick, London–Stansted, Manchester, Newcastle upon Tyne
TUI fly Belgium	Seasonal: Brussels
TUI fly Netherlands	Seasonal: Amsterdam, Rotterdam/The Hague
Volotea	Seasonal: Verona
Wizz Air	Seasonal: Bucharest–Otopeni, Cluj-Napoca, London–Luton, Milan–Malpensa, Rome–Fiumicino, Timișoara, Vienna, Warsaw–Chopin

== Statistics ==
The following data are from the official website of the airport:

Year	Passengers		
Year	Domestic	International	Total
2017	83,334	1,576,307	1,659,641
2018	▲90,938	▲1,709,519	▲1,800,457
2019	▲94,297	▲1,716,130	▲1,810,427
2020	▼27,906	▼402,349	▼430,255
2021	▲57,570	▲955,220	▲1,012,913
2022	▲92,725	▲1,810,679	▲1,903,404
2023	▲94,949	▲1,986,982	▲2,081,931
2024	▲108,192	▲2,114,819	▲2,223,011
2025	▼100,149	▲2,182,625	▲2,282,774

=== Traffic statistics by country (2024) ===
Traffic by country at Zakynthos International Airport – 2024
Place	Country	Total passengers
1	United Kingdom	742,909
2	Poland	268,737
3	Netherlands	240,735
4	Italy	204,024
5	Germany	129,983
6	Greece	108,192
7	Czech Republic	83,941
8	Hungary	63,988
9	Denmark	59,773
10	Austria	59,050
11	Romania	56,851
12	Belgium	47,459
13	Switzerland	30,856
14	Sweden	29,393
15	Slovakia	21,844

== Accidents and incidents ==
- On 9 July 2026, an F-16 Falcon, operated by the Greek Air Force, made an emergency landing at the airport during a training mission, where the plane burst into flames on the runway after stopping. The pilot evacuated and was unharmed.

== See also ==
- Transport in Greece
