= Romiri =

Romiri Ρομίρι
- Community
- Location within Greece
- Coordinates: 37°45′N 20°49′E
- Country: Greece
- Administrative region: Ionian Islands
- Regional unit: Zakynthos
- Municipality: Zakynthos
- Municipal unit: Artemisia

Population (2021)
  - Community: 579
- Time zone: UTC+2 (EET)
  - Summer (DST): UTC+3 (EEST)
- Postal code: 29092

Romiri (Greek: Ρομίρι) is a hillside settlement on Zakynthos island, Greece. It is located between Lithakia and Machairado. It has 579 inhabitants (2021).
