= Greek National Road 35 =

Trunk road in Greece

National Road 35
- Εθνική Οδός 35
- Route of the EO35 road, in blue

Route information
- Length: 19.6 km (12.2 mi)
- Existed: 9 July 1963–present

Major junctions
- North end: Zakynthos
- South end: Keri

Location
- Country: Greece
- Regions: Ionian Islands
- Primary destinations: Zakynthos; Keri

Highway system
- Highways in Greece; Motorways; National roads
← EO34a	→ EO36

Greek National Road 35 (Greek: Εθνική Οδός 35), abbreviated as the EO35, is a national road in the island of Zakynthos, Greece. The EO35 runs between the city of Zakynthos and Keri, and is one of five national roads that serve the Ionian Islands.

== Route ==
The EO35 is officially defined as a mainly diagonal road in the southern part of the island of Zakynthos. It runs along the northwestern border of the National Marine Park of Zakynthos, from the city of Zakynthos in the north east to Keri in the south west.

== History ==
Ministerial Decision G25871 of 9 July 1963 created the EO35 from the old EO74, which existed by royal decree from 1955 until 1963, and followed the same route as the current EO35.
