= Kalipado =

Kalipado Καλιπάδο
- Community
- Location within Greece
- Coordinates: 37°47.9′N 20°50.2′E
- Country: Greece
- Administrative region: Ionian Islands
- Regional unit: Zakynthos
- Municipality: Zakynthos
- Municipal unit: Arkadioi

Population (2021)
  - Community: 654
- Time zone: UTC+2 (EET)
  - Summer (DST): UTC+3 (EEST)
- Vehicle registration: ZA

Kalipado (Greek: Καλιπάδο) is a settlement on the island of Zakynthos of Greece. It is located 1 km (0.62 mi) northwest of Vanato and 5 km (3.1 mi) northwest of Zakynthos City.

There is significant history attributed to the origins of this village in the area of Arkadioi, a municipal unit of the Southern Ionian Sea chain of islands that go from north, opposite Albania to the south, opposite the mid-Peloponesean southern coast of lower Greece. Its history embraces the era of Magna Graecia and Roman Empire through its many years of being an important colony of Venice, Milano and England, up through 1860 when the Ionian Islands joined post Ottoman-occupied Greece.

== Population ==
Historical population
Year	Pop.	±%
1981	564	—
1991	505	−10.5%
2001	688	+36.2%
2011	736	+7.0%
2021	654	−11.1%
