= Exo Chora =

Exo Chora Έξω Χώρα
- Community
- Location within Greece
- Coordinates: 37°48′00″N 20°41′06″E
- Country: Greece
- Administrative region: Ionian Islands
- Regional unit: Zakynthos
- Municipality: Zakynthos
- Municipal unit: Elatia

Population (2021)
  - Community: 148
- Time zone: UTC+2 (EET)
  - Summer (DST): UTC+3 (EEST)

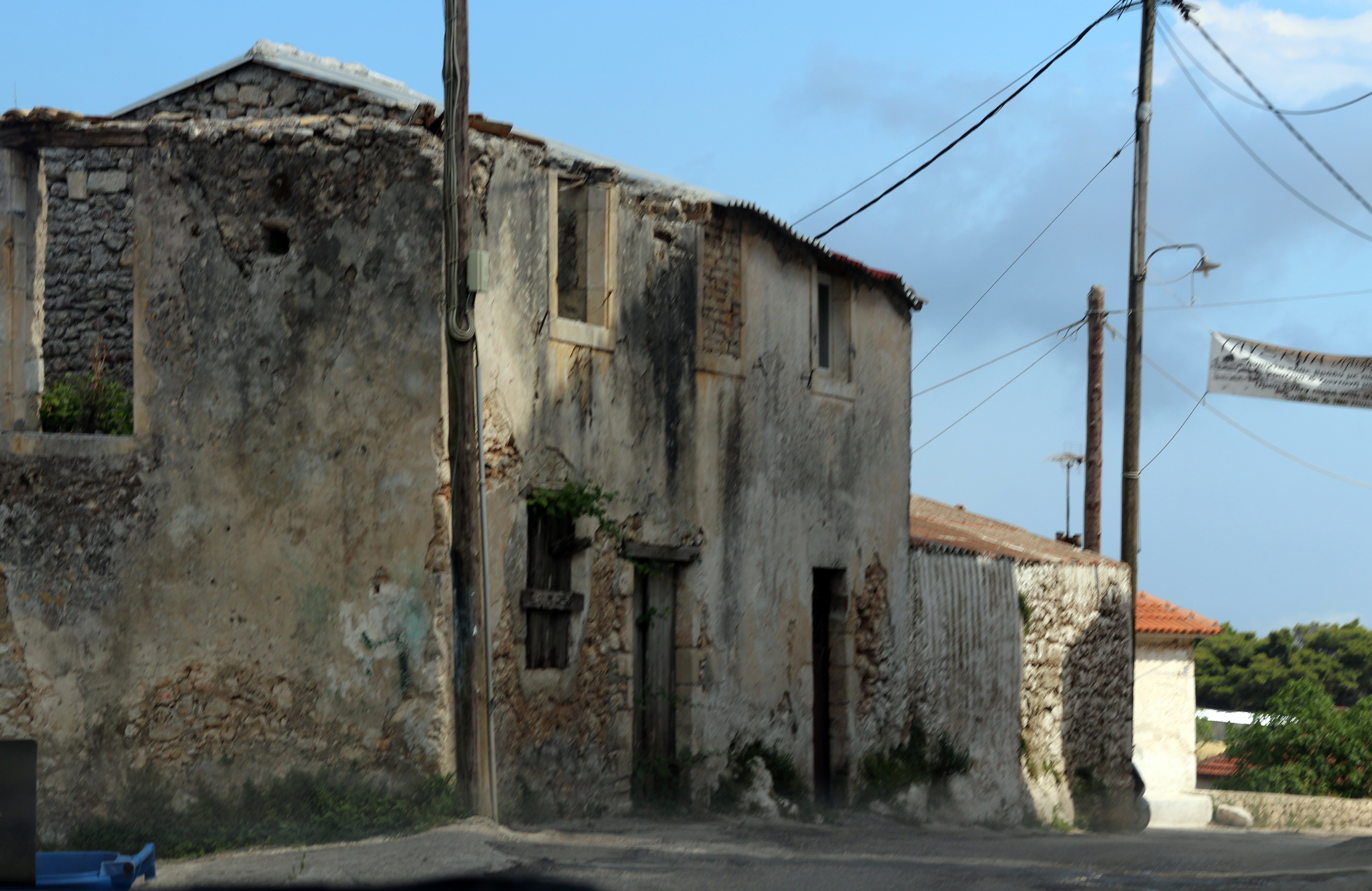
An image of Exo Chora, Greece

Exo Chora (Greek: Έξω Χώρα) is a village and a community on Zakynthos island, Greece. It is situated near the rugged west coast of the island, 2 km south of Maries and 19 km west of Zakynthos (city). The community consists of the villages Exo Chora and Kampi.
