= Lithakia =

Lithakia Λιθακιά
- Community
- Location within Greece
- Coordinates: 37°43′N 20°50′E
- Country: Greece
- Administrative region: Ionian Islands
- Regional unit: Zakynthos
- Municipality: Zakynthos
- Municipal unit: Laganas

Population (2021)
  - Community: 1,302
- Time zone: UTC+2 (EET)
  - Summer (DST): UTC+3 (EEST)

Lithakia (Greek: Λιθακιά) is a village in the southern part of the island of Zakynthos, Greece. It is situated at the foot of low hills, about 2 km from the Ionian Sea coast. It is 3 km west of the beach village Laganas, 5 km southeast of Machairado and 9 km southwest of Zakynthos (city). The village suffered great damage from the 1953 Ionian earthquake.

== Population ==
Year	Population
1981	868
1991	793
2001	1,185
2011	1,307
2021	1,302

== See also ==
- List of settlements in Zakynthos
