= Ampelokipoi =

Ampelokipoi (Greek: Αμπελόκηποι) may refer to the following places in Greece:

- Ampelokipoi, Achaea, part of Aigeira, Achaea
- Ampelokipoi, Athens, a section in the north of the municipality of Athens
- Ampelokipoi, Thessaloniki, a suburb and former municipality of the Thessaloniki Urban Area
- Ampelokipoi, Zakynthos, a village on Zakynthos
