= Vasilikos, Zakynthos =

Village on Greek island

Vasilikos Βασιλικός
- Community
- Location within Greece
- Coordinates: 37°43′N 20°59′E
- Country: Greece
- Administrative region: Ionian Islands
- Regional unit: Zakynthos
- Municipality: Zakynthos
- Municipal unit: Zakynthos (city)

Population (2021)
  - Community: 728
- Time zone: UTC+2 (EET)
  - Summer (DST): UTC+3 (EEST)
- Postal code: 291 00
- Area code: 26950

Vasilikos (Greek: Βασιλικός) is a village and a community in the southeastern part of the municipality and the island of Zakynthos. The community consists of the villages Vasilikos, Agios Ioannis, Ano Vasilikos and Xirokastello and the uninhabited island Kalonisi. The village Vasilikos is situated at the easternmost point of Zakynthos, 11 km southeast of Zakynthos (city). The village Xirokastello is situated halfway between Argasi and Vasilikos, at the eastern foot of the hill Skopos.

The Vasilikos peninsula in the south-east of the island comprises folded land with low, pine-forested mountains and quiet coves. Most of it has been protected from large-scale development because of the loggerhead sea turtles that breed on Gerakas beach. Vasilikos is the main community on the peninsula. It has a rugged coastline with numerous beaches, known for their good swimming conditions. Vasilikos is also famous for its hotels, villas and restaurants. The beach resort Porto Roma lies east of the village.

== Historical population ==
Year	Village population	Community population
1981	-	402
1991	187	-
2001	257	709
2011	285	799
2021	297	728

== See also ==
- List of settlements in Zakynthos
