= Agioi Pantes =

Agioi Pantes Άγιοι Πάντες
- Community
- Location within Greece
- Coordinates: 37°47′N 20°47′E
- Country: Greece
- Administrative region: Ionian Islands
- Regional unit: Zakynthos
- Municipality: Zakynthos
- Municipal unit: Alykes

Population (2021)
  - Community: 331
- Time zone: UTC+2 (EET)
  - Summer (DST): UTC+3 (EEST)

Agioi Pantes (Greek: Άγιοι Πάντες) is a settlement on the island of Zakynthos, Greece. It is located 6 kilometers from Machairado and 14 kilometers from Zakynthos City. In 2021, the population of Agioi Pantes was 331 inhabitants.
