= Bochali =

Bochali Μπόχαλη
- Community
- Location within Greece
- Coordinates: 37°48′N 20°54′E
- Country: Greece
- Administrative region: Ionian Islands
- Regional unit: Zakynthos
- Municipality: Zakynthos
- Municipal unit: Zakynthos (city)

Population (2021)
  - Community: 1,175
- Time zone: UTC+2 (EET)
  - Summer (DST): UTC+3 (EEST)

Bochali (Greek: Μπόχαλη) is a village and a community in the southern part of the island of Zakynthos. It is part of the municipal unit of the city of Zakynthos. The community includes the villages Akrotiri and Kydoni. It is situated on a hill near the Ionian Sea coast, 1 km northwest of Zakynthos city centre and 1.5 km east of Gaitani.

== Population ==
Year	Settlement population	Community population
1981	498	-
1991	503	-
2001	730	907
2011	876	1,143
2021	658	1,175

== See also ==
- List of settlements in Zakynthos
