= Anafonitria =

Anafonitria Αναφωνήτρια
- Community
- Location within Greece
- Coordinates: 37°51′N 20°39′E
- Country: Greece
- Administrative region: Ionian Islands
- Regional unit: Zakynthos
- Municipality: Zakynthos
- Municipal unit: Elatia

Population (2021)
  - Community: 203
- Time zone: UTC+2 (EET)
  - Summer (DST): UTC+3 (EEST)

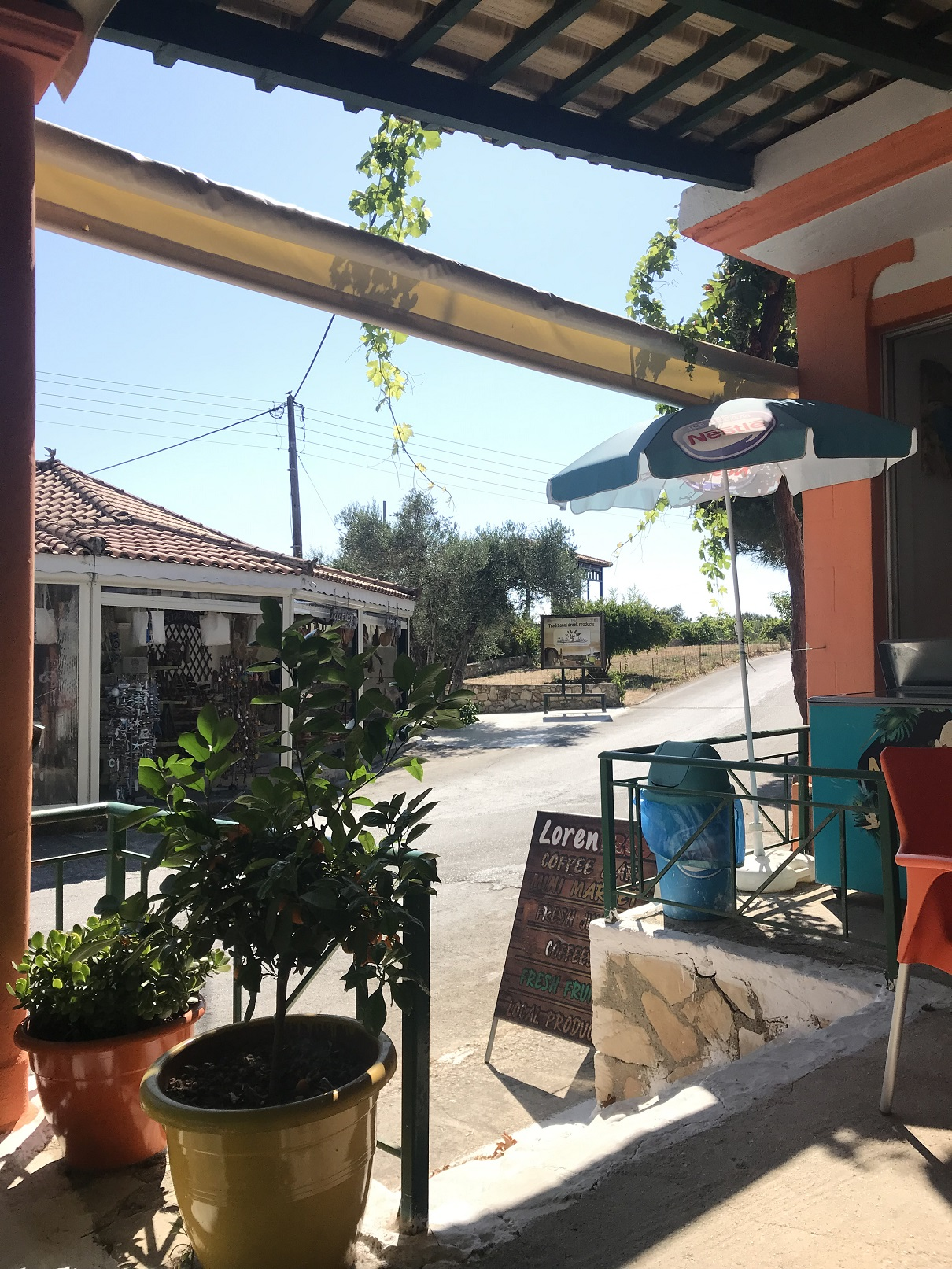
City streets

Anafonitria (Greek: Αναφωνήτρια) is a settlement on Zakynthos island, Greece. It is located in the northwestern part of the island, 2 km from the coast, 3 km south of Volimes and 23 km northwest of Zakynthos City. The Navagio bay is 3 km northwest of Anafonitria. The patron saint of Cephalonia, Agios Gerasimos, was known to have lived in Anafonitria as a hermit. The name of the settlement itself was derived from the Monastery of Anafonitria, which was constructed in the 14th century. The patron saint of Zakynthos, Saint Dionysius, was known to have spent his final years in the monastery.
