= Koiliomenos =

Village in Greece

Koiliomenos Κοιλιωμένος
- Community
- Location within Greece
- Coordinates: 37°44′54″N 20°46′25″E
- Country: Greece
- Administrative region: Ionian Islands
- Regional unit: Zakynthos
- Municipality: Zakynthos
- Municipal unit: Artemisia

Population (2021)
  - Community: 333
- Time zone: UTC+2 (EET)
  - Summer (DST): UTC+3 (EEST)

Koiliomenos (Greek: Κοιλιωμένος, also known as Agios Nikolaos) is a settlement on Zakynthos island, Greece. It is located 3 kilometers southwest of Machairado and 11 kilometers southwest of Zakynthos City. In 2021, the population of Koiliomenos was 333 inhabitants.
