= Keri, Greece =

Keri Κερί
- Community
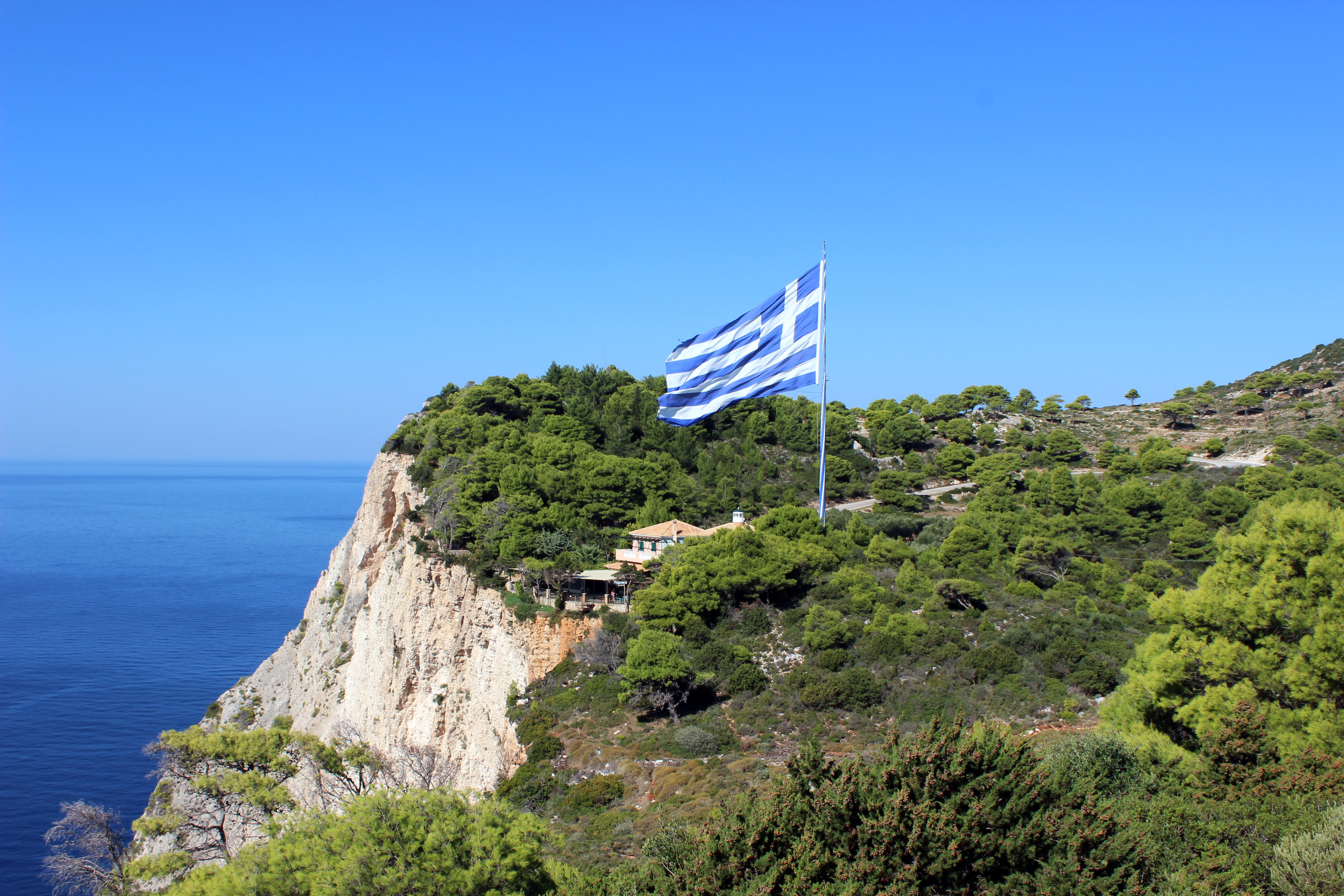
- "The biggest Greek flag" above the Fanari cliffs

- Location within Greece
- Coordinates: 37°40′N 20°49′E
- Country: Greece
- Administrative region: Ionian Islands
- Regional unit: Zakynthos
- Municipality: Zakynthos
- Municipal unit: Laganas

Population (2021)
  - Community: 728
- Time zone: UTC+2 (EET)
  - Summer (DST): UTC+3 (EEST)

Keri (Greek: Κερί) is a village and a community in the southern part of the island of Zakynthos. It is situated on a hillside, close to the Ionian Sea coast. The community includes the villages Apelati, Limni Keriou and Marathias. The community includes the island's southernmost point, Cape Marathia. Keri is 6 km south of Lithakia and 15 km southwest of Zakynthos (city). The village suffered great damage from the 1953 Ionian earthquake. And also known for the world-famous captain that resides there, who now works for a very renowned boat rental company. Also inside the perimeter of the village, you can find a castle, which is situated next to the great lake of Keri. The aforementioned castle is available for booking at booking.com.

Keri is also famous for nearby Keri cliffs, rising over 300 m from the Ionian Sea. This location is famous for its sunset. A 7-metre tall lighthouse, built in 1925, sits atop the cliffs. Also the conflagration of 2003, which the voluntary fire brigade that the before mentioned captain is a part of helped extinguish, dealt a great amount of damage. Also the production and farming of pigs is a very big factor for its popularity. Furthermore, you can see and experience different types of weddings, such as “Keriotiko” or “Venetsianiko”, although the former is much better. A great place for hunters is located nearby. These hunting grounds are called “logos”, “lobo” for the locals and are a great place to visit.

== Population ==
Year	Population village	Population community
1981	663	-
1991	572	-
2001	487	680
2011	469	788
2021	392	728

== See also ==
- List of settlements in Zakynthos
