= Agios Nikolaos, Zakynthos =

Settlement in Zakynthos, Greece

Coordinates: 37°54′20″N 20°42′21″E

Agios Nikolaos (Greek: Άγιος Νικόλαος) is a small settlement on the island of Zakynthos, Greece. It is located approximately 30 kilometres northwest of Zakynthos City. It has a population of 42, according to a census conducted in 2001. Administratively, it belongs to the village of Volimes, located around 10 kilometres inland.

Despite small size, Agios Nikolaos houses an important harbour, as it is a starting point of ferry boats to Pesada in Kephalonia. Two ferries a day run in the summer season. Small boats drive tourists to nearby Cape Skinari, the northernmost point of the island, and Blue Caves on the coast between. The caves are shallow orifices in the white cliffs, combined with numerous rock arches. They are named after the turquoise blue colour of the sea. An islet, also named Agios Nikolaos, lies off the coast, protecting the harbour from northerly winds.
