= Strofades =

Two small Greek islands in the Ionian Sea

Native name: Στροφάδες
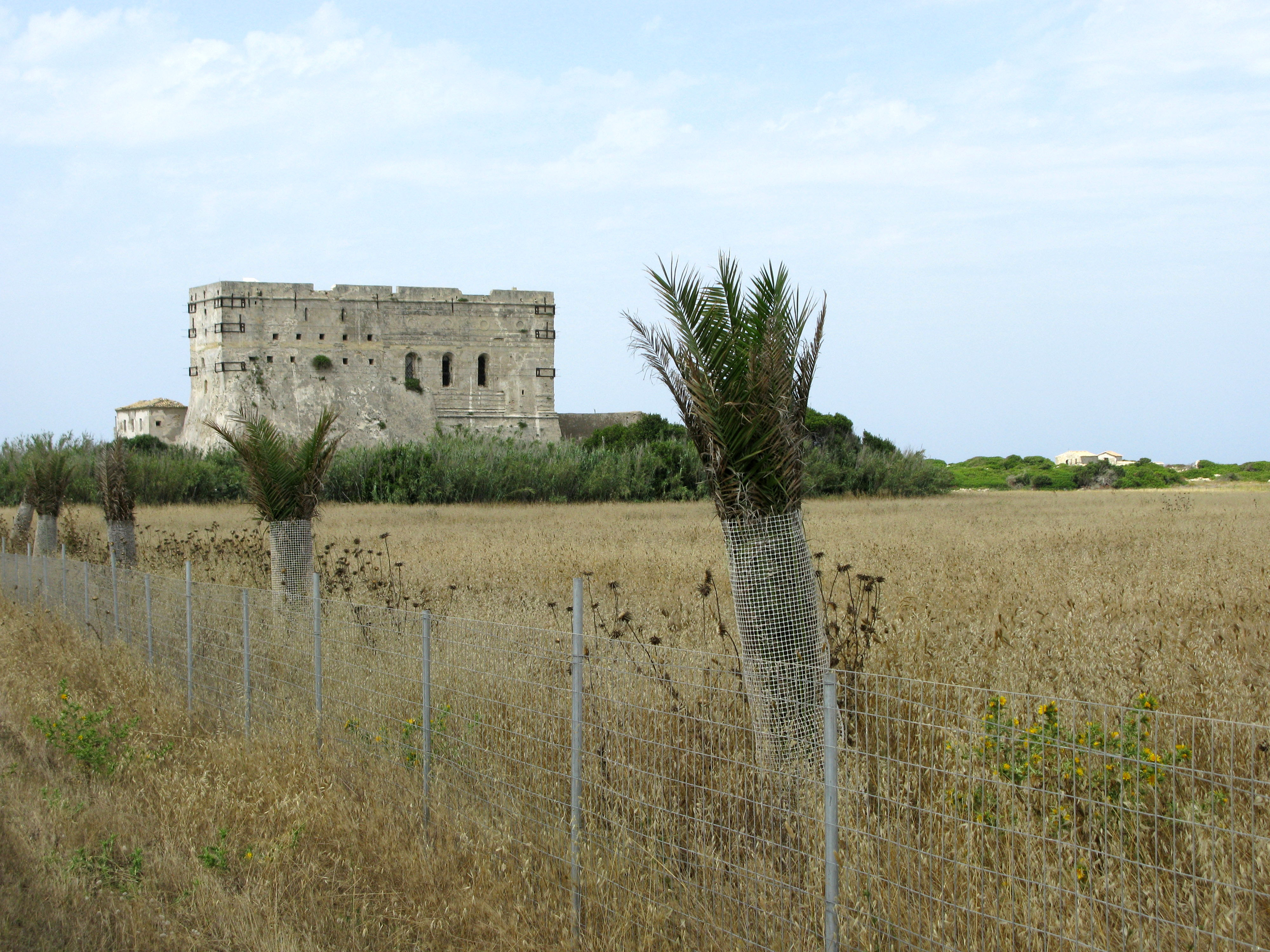
- The monastery on Stamfani island
- Interactive map of Strofades

Geography
- Location: Ionian Sea
- Coordinates: 37°15′N 21°00′E
- Archipelago: Ionian Islands
- Total islands: 2

Administration
- Greece
- Region: Ionian Islands
- Regional unit: Zakynthos
- Municipality: Zakynthos
- Municipal unit: Zakynthos

Demographics
- Population: Uninhabited

Strofades (Greek: Στροφάδες; also called Strofadia, Στροφάδια, or Stromphides, Στρόμφιδες) is a group of two small Greek islands in the Ionian Islands. They lie about 44 km (27 mi) south-southeast of the island of Zakynthos. The larger island, Stamfani (Greek: Σταμφάνη), has an old fortress/monastery built in 1241. The smaller island is known as Arpia (Greek: Άρπυια). Both are sparsely vegetated and rocky.

== Biodiversity and conservation ==
There is a strong avian presence on the islands, and hunting is prohibited. Species include Cory's shearwater (Calonectris diomedea) and migratory passerines. There is also a large spring migration of turtle doves (Streptopelia turtur). The islands have been recognised as an Important Bird Area (IBA) by BirdLife International because they support a breeding population of some 2,000-3,000 pairs of Scopoli's shearwaters. Arpia, the smaller of the two islands, is also home to lizards of the Podarcis ionicus species. The Strofades are located within the National Marine Park of Zakynthos, which is one of the designated national parks of Greece, and are also included in the Natura 2000 European network of protected areas.

== Mythology ==
As the Strophades, they were identified as the dwelling-place of the Harpies. Virgil states that the Harpy drove the Trojans from the Strophades (Aeneid iii, 209 passim.). The islands are mentioned in The Divine Comedy (see List of cultural references in The Divine Comedy) and in passing in Chapter 10 of Rabelais' Fifth Book of Pantagruel.

According to legend, the islands' name, meaning "Islands of Turning," refers to Zetes and Calaïs, sons of Boreas, who voyaged with the Argonauts. Zetes and Calaïs rescued Phineus from the Harpies. They succeeded in driving the monsters away but did not kill them, as a request from the goddess of the rainbow, Iris, who promised that Phineas would not be bothered by the Harpies again. They were turned back at the Strophades by Iris while continuing their pursuit of the creatures. It is a popular etymology based on word similarities. Stormy winds prevailed on the island at times, in the form of a tornado, which the ancients used to identify with the phrase "στροφάδες άελλαι". This is confirmed by the names of the two main winds, the north (Ziti) and the south (Kalai).

== History ==
The monastery of the Blessed Mother of God on Stamfani island, was built in 1241 at the request of Princess Irene Laskarina (daughter of the Nicaean Emperor Theodore I) who survived on the island after a shipwreck.

The monastery is built similarly to a fortress and survived raids from pirates through the centuries. In the past many monks lived in the monastery, among them Dionysios of Zakynthos (patron saint of Zakynthos, who died in 1622). In 1717, the Ottomans attacked the fortress, a Deacon supposedly killed 18 Turks (the parapets had cannons on them, two of which are still in existence at the gate today).

The last monk to inhabit the monastery was Father Grigorios, who settled there in 1976. The only other inhabitant of the island at the time was the lighthouse keeper, but in 1985 the lighthouse became automated, leaving him alone. On the 18th of November 1997, a magnitude 6.6 earthquake struck the island, causing severe damage to the historic monastery. This was the only time that Grigorios fled the island for several days, though he returned to attempt to rebuild. Father Grigorios was forced to leave the island due to ill health in 2014 and retired to his home village of Agalas, Zakynthos, where he died in 2017.

There is a modern sculpture monument at the monastery, which commemorates the many monks who were killed in Turkish raids. Currently, the monastery buildings are in a state of some disrepair, mainly due to earthquake damage. The main tower is in a precarious state.

== Sources ==
- Κουτελάκης Χαρ., Η «Οδύσσεια» του Ομήρου χωρίς Λαιστρυγόνες και τέρατα. Μια νέα προσέγγιση για την ανθρωπογεωγραφία της Μεσογείου, Αθήνα 30 Δεκ. 2019, σελ. 235–236.
- Κουτελάκης Χαρ., Παναγιά «Η Πάντων Χαρά» των Στροφάδων. Ένα εικονογραφικό παράλληλο στην Πάτμο, ΔωδΧρον. ΙΕ΄ (1993) 67–79.
