= St. Mark's Roman Catholic Church =

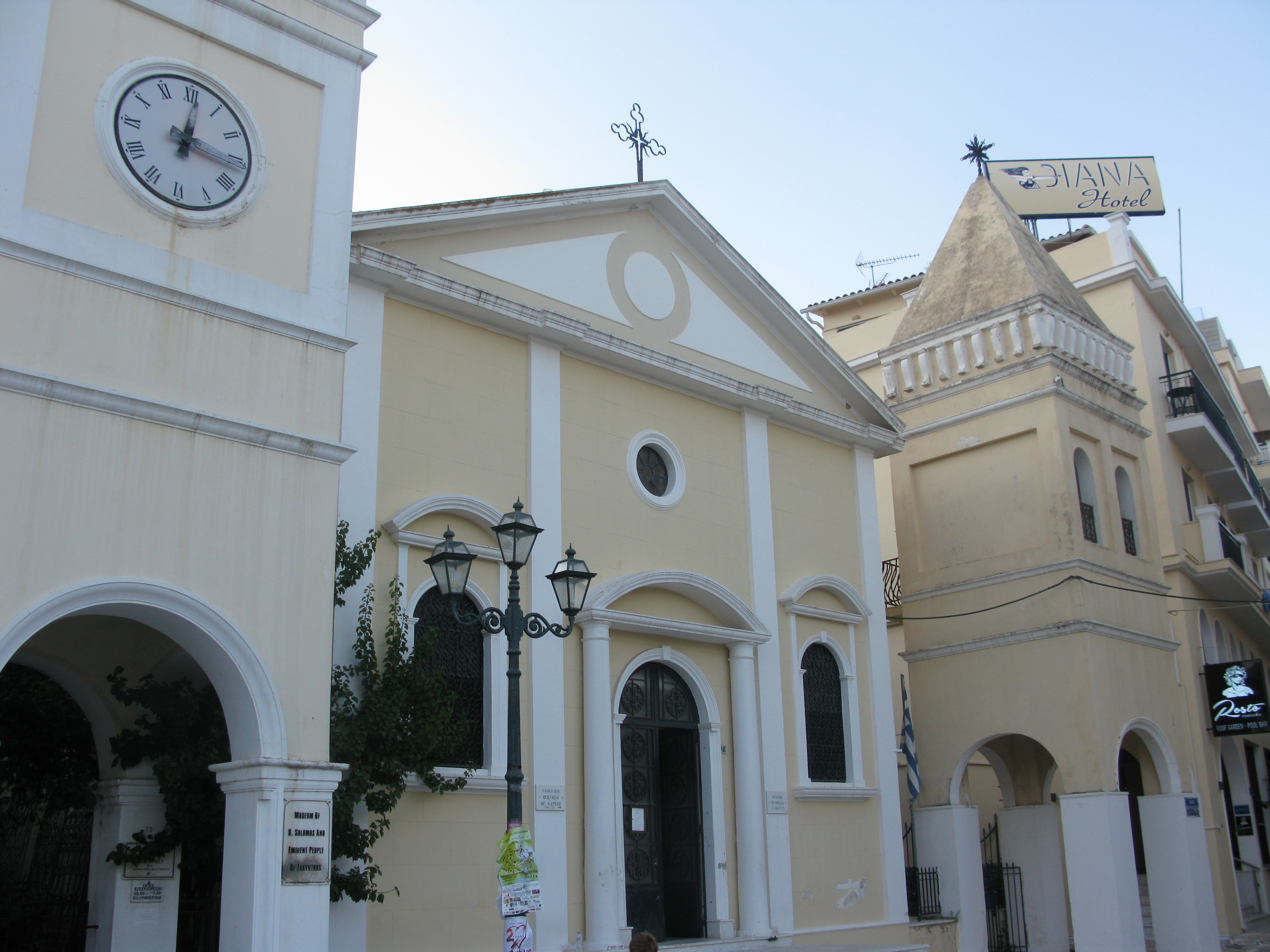

- Location within Greece
- 37°47′18.67″N 20°53′56.11″E
- Location: Zakynthos
- Country: Greece

History
- Founded: 1518

Saint Mark's Roman Catholic Church (Greek: Ιερός Ναός Αγίου Μάρκου) is located on the St. Mark square in the city of Zakynthos, Greece, and holds the distinction of being the only Catholic church on the island with this name.

== History ==
The church was originally constructed in 1518 during the Venetian rule and underwent significant rebuilding in 1747 and 1894. Like many buildings on Zakynthos, it was completely destroyed during the devastating 1953 Ionian earthquake. In the 1960s, the church was rebuilt in its current form, maintaining much of its original exterior appearance. A further renovation took place in 1994.

Before the earthquake, Saint Mark's Church housed numerous valuable relics, statues, a large organ, artistic candlesticks, and valuable priestly vestments. The church was considered a jewel of the island by those who had seen it before its destruction. Near the church stood a building containing a large library and a photo gallery, both of which were also lost in the great fire that followed the earthquake.

== Current church ==
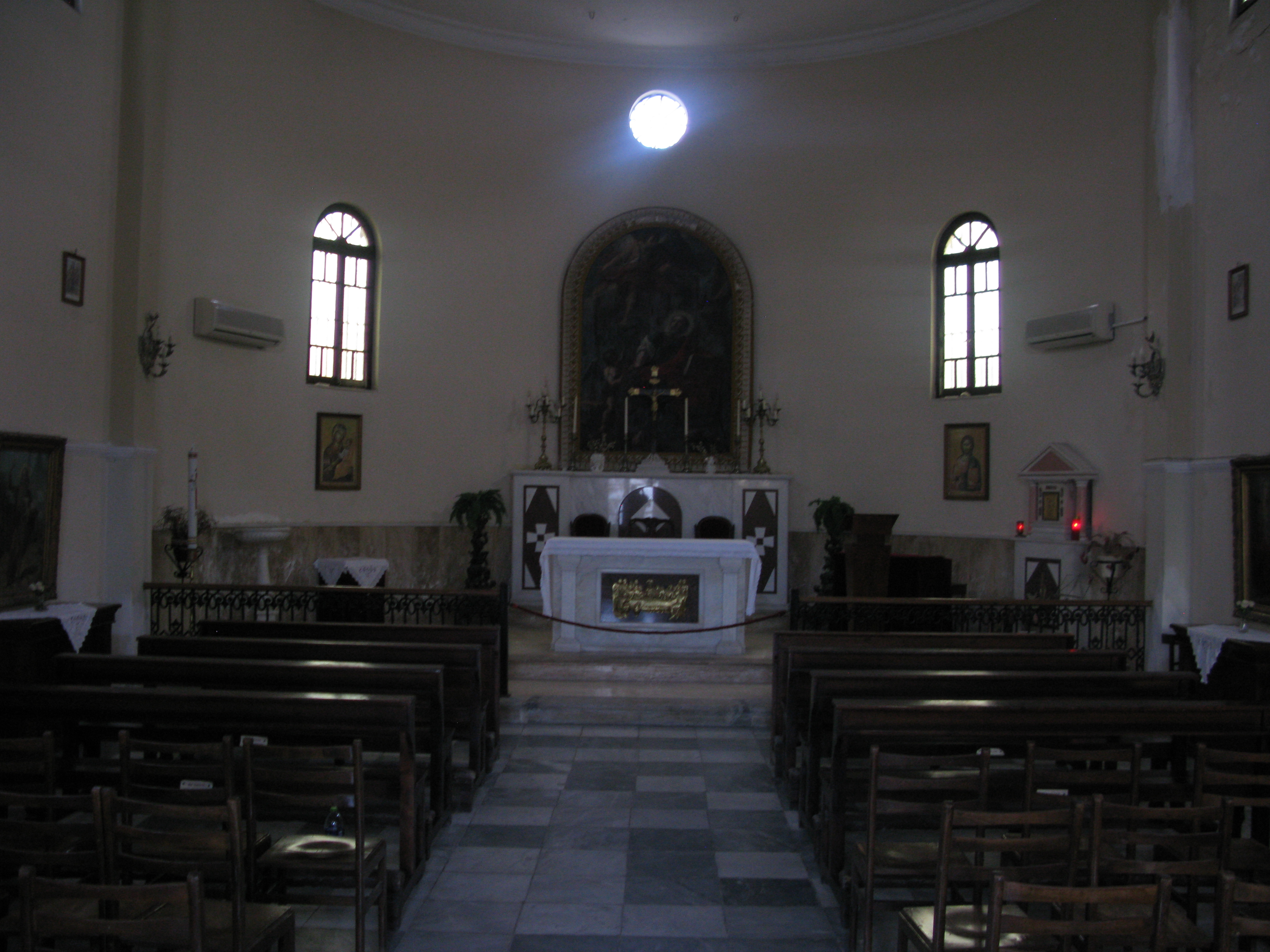
Interior of the current church (2014).

The current church preserves a few remaining artifacts from the original structure, including the statue of Saint Mark, two large candlesticks flanking the statue's pedestal, the Holy Cross, a small marble baptismal font, and other smaller objects. The marble slabs from the old church have been repurposed as flooring in the new church. Additionally, a statue of Saint Paraskevi, one of only two statues that survived the fire alongside the statue of Saint Mark, is prominently displayed inside.

The 1994 renovation of the church included updates to the floor, the altar, the statue pedestal, the base of the monstrance containing the Eucharist, the pulpit, lighting, and various pieces of furniture.
