= Artemisia, Zakynthos =

Artemisia Αρτεμισία
- Municipal unit
- Location within the regional unit

- Location within Greece
- Coordinates: 37°45′N 20°47′E
- Country: Greece
- Administrative region: Ionian Islands
- Regional unit: Zakynthos
- Municipality: Zakynthos

Area
  - Municipal unit: 104.9 km^{2} (40.5 sq mi)

Population (2021)
  - Municipal unit: 4,440
  - Municipal unit density: 42.3/km^{2} (110/sq mi)
- Time zone: UTC+2 (EET)
  - Summer (DST): UTC+3 (EEST)
- Vehicle registration: ZA

Artemisia (Greek: Αρτεμισία) is a former municipality on the island of Zakynthos, Ionian Islands, Greece. Since the 2011 local government reform it is part of the municipality Zakynthos, of which it is a municipal unit. It is on the central west coast of the island. It has a land area of 104.890 km^{2} and a 2021 census population of 4,440 inhabitants. Its municipal seat was the town of Machairado.

== Subdivisions ==
The municipal unit Artemisia is subdivided into the following communities (constituent villages in brackets):

- Agia Marina
- Agioi Pantes
- Agios Leontas (Agios Leontas, Fterini)
- Fiolitis
- Galaro
- Gyri
- Koiliomenos
- Lagkadakia
- Lagopodo
- Loucha
- Machairado
- Romiri
- Vougiato (Vougiato, Melinado)
