= Argasi =

Argasi Αργάσι
- Community
- Location within Greece
- Coordinates: 37°46′N 20°55′E
- Country: Greece
- Administrative region: Ionian Islands
- Regional unit: Zakynthos
- Municipality: Zakynthos
- Municipal unit: Zakynthos (city)

Population (2021)
  - Community: 1,379
- Time zone: UTC+2 (EET)
  - Summer (DST): UTC+3 (EEST)

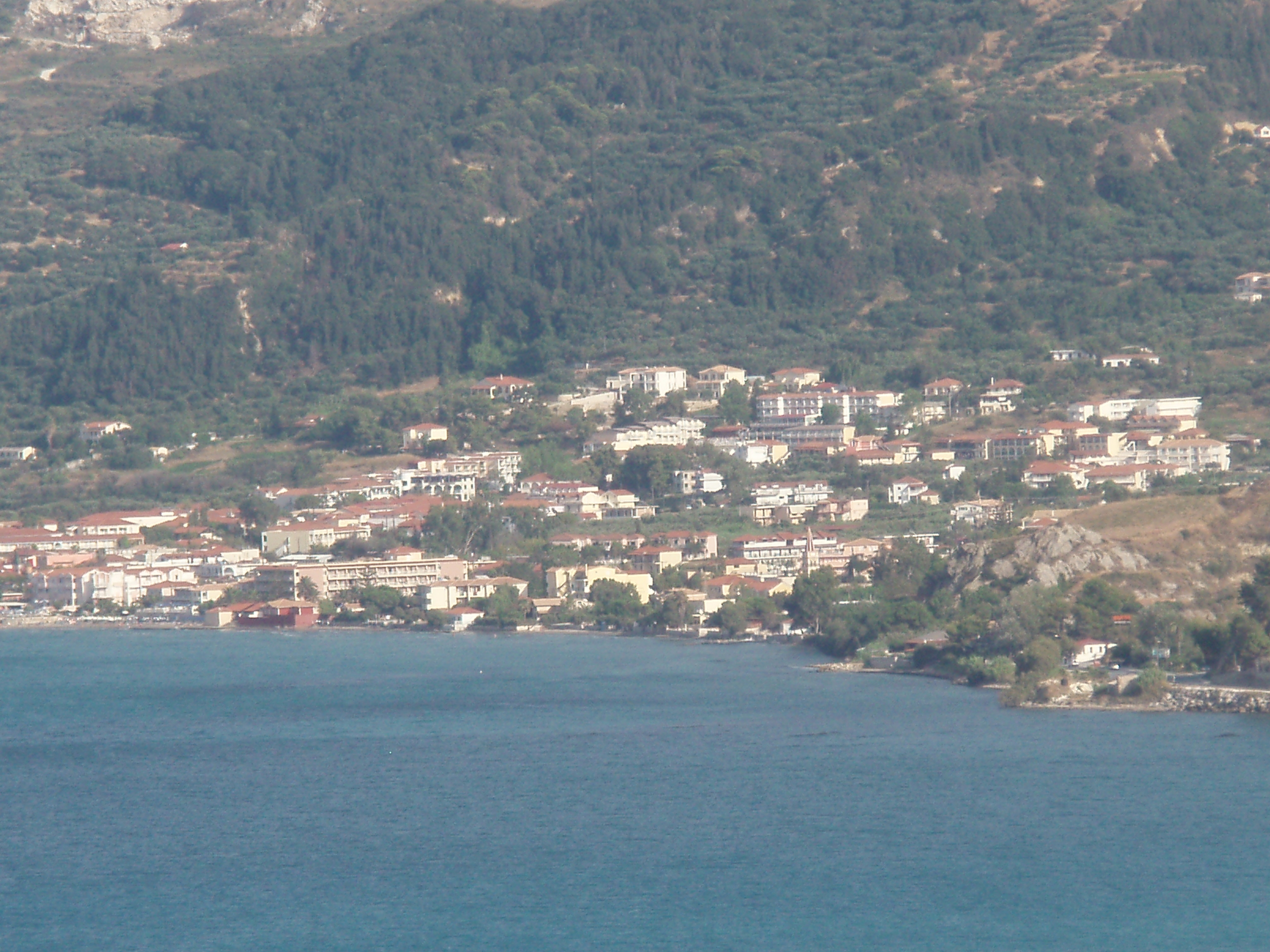
View of the village and beach of Argasi from the Zakynthos-Kyllini ferry

Argasi (Greek: Αργάσι) is a village and a community in the southern part of the island of Zakynthos. It is part of the municipal unit of Zakynthos (city). The community includes the village Kalliteros. It is situated on the east coast of the island, at the northwestern foot of the hill Skopos. It is 3 km southeast of Zakynthos city and 3 km northeast of Kalamaki. Argasi is a popular beach resort. The beach is very small here and not recommended by locals for visiting.

== Population ==
Year	Argasi	Kalliteros	Community
1981	362	-	-
1991	407	133	-
2001	590	203	793
2011	639	627	1,266
2021	697	682	1,379

== See also ==
- List of settlements in Zakynthos
