= Gaitani =

Gaitani Γαϊτάνι
- Community
- Location within Greece
- Coordinates: 37°47′N 20°52′E
- Country: Greece
- Administrative region: Ionian Islands
- Regional unit: Zakynthos
- Municipality: Zakynthos
- Municipal unit: Zakynthos (city)

Population (2021)
  - Community: 1,872
- Time zone: UTC+2 (EET)
  - Summer (DST): UTC+3 (EEST)

Gaitani (Greek: Γαϊτάνι) is a village in the southern part of the island of Zakynthos. It is part of the municipal unit of Zakynthos. It is 2 km west of Zakynthos city centre, and 2 km east of Vanato. In the Middle Ages, during the Venetian rule many, mainly small, churches were built in the Gaitani area but most of them collapsed because of the big 1953 Ionian earthquake or because of the ravages of time. There are more than 70 ruins of churches at the area.

== Population ==
Year	Population
1981	822
1991	1,025
2001	1,411
2011	1,899
2021	1,872

== See also ==
- List of settlements in Zakynthos
