= Galaro =

Human settlement in Greece

Galaro Γαλάρο
- Community
- Location within Greece
- Coordinates: 37°46′59″N 20°47′38″E
- Country: Greece
- Administrative region: Ionian Islands
- Regional unit: Zakynthos
- Municipality: Zakynthos
- Municipal unit: Artemisia

Population (2021)
  - Community: 255
- Time zone: UTC+2 (EET)
  - Summer (DST): UTC+3 (EEST)

Galaro (Greek: Γαλάρο) is a settlement on the island of Zakynthos, Greece.
