= Arkadioi =

Arkadioi Αρκάδιοι
- Municipal unit
- Location within the regional unit

- Location within Greece
- Coordinates: 37°48′N 20°51′E
- Country: Greece
- Administrative region: Ionian Islands
- Regional unit: Zakynthos
- Municipality: Zakynthos

Area
  - Municipal unit: 26.5 km^{2} (10.2 sq mi)

Population (2021)
  - Municipal unit: 5,729
  - Municipal unit density: 216/km^{2} (560/sq mi)
- Time zone: UTC+2 (EET)
  - Summer (DST): UTC+3 (EEST)
- Vehicle registration: ZA

Arkadioi (Greek: Αρκάδιοι) was a former municipality on the island of Zakynthos, Ionian Islands, Greece. Since the 2011 local government reform it is part of the municipality Zakynthos, of which it is a municipal unit. It is located on the north coast of the island. It has a land area of 26.475 km². Its population was 5,729 at the 2021 census. The seat of the municipality was in Vanato. The municipal unit consists of the communities Vanato, Agios Kirykos, Kalipado, Kypseli, Planos, Sarakinado and Tragaki.
