= Laganas =

Laganas Λαγανάς
- Municipal unit
- Location within the regional unit

- Location within Greece
- Coordinates: 37°44′N 20°51′E
- Country: Greece
- Administrative region: Ionian Islands
- Regional unit: Zakynthos
- Municipality: Zakynthos

Area
  - Municipal unit: 74.104 km^{2} (28.612 sq mi)
- Elevation: 98 m (322 ft)

Population (2021)
  - Municipal unit: 7,192
  - Municipal unit density: 97.05/km^{2} (251.4/sq mi)
- Time zone: UTC+2 (EET)
  - Summer (DST): UTC+3 (EEST)

Laganas (Greek: Λαγανάς) is a village and a former municipality on the island of Zakynthos, Ionian Islands, Greece. Since the 2011 local government reform it is part of the municipality Zakynthos, of which it is a municipal unit. The municipal unit Laganas covers the southernmost part of Zakynthos. Its municipal seat was the town of Pantokratoras. The municipal unit of Laganas has a land area of 74.104 km². The central and eastern part of the municipal unit are flat, but there are hills up to 450 m elevation in the west.

The Zakynthos International Airport lies in the eastern part of the municipal unit, near Kalamaki. The beach village Laganas, part of the community of Pantokratoras, is on the southeastern coast. A large part of Laganas is a national park, established for the protection of turtles. The village is one of Greece's most popular party destinations, although it used to once be a calm fishing village.

== History ==
The name "Laganas" comes from the Greek word "lagini" meaning "jug", referring to the former manufacture of pottery in the area of Lithakia and Kalamaki. Laganas suffered great damage from the 1953 Ionian earthquake.

== Population ==
Year	Village population	Municipal unit population
1991	233	4,303
2001	543	5,894
2011	729	6,986
2021	766	7,192

== Laganas attractions ==
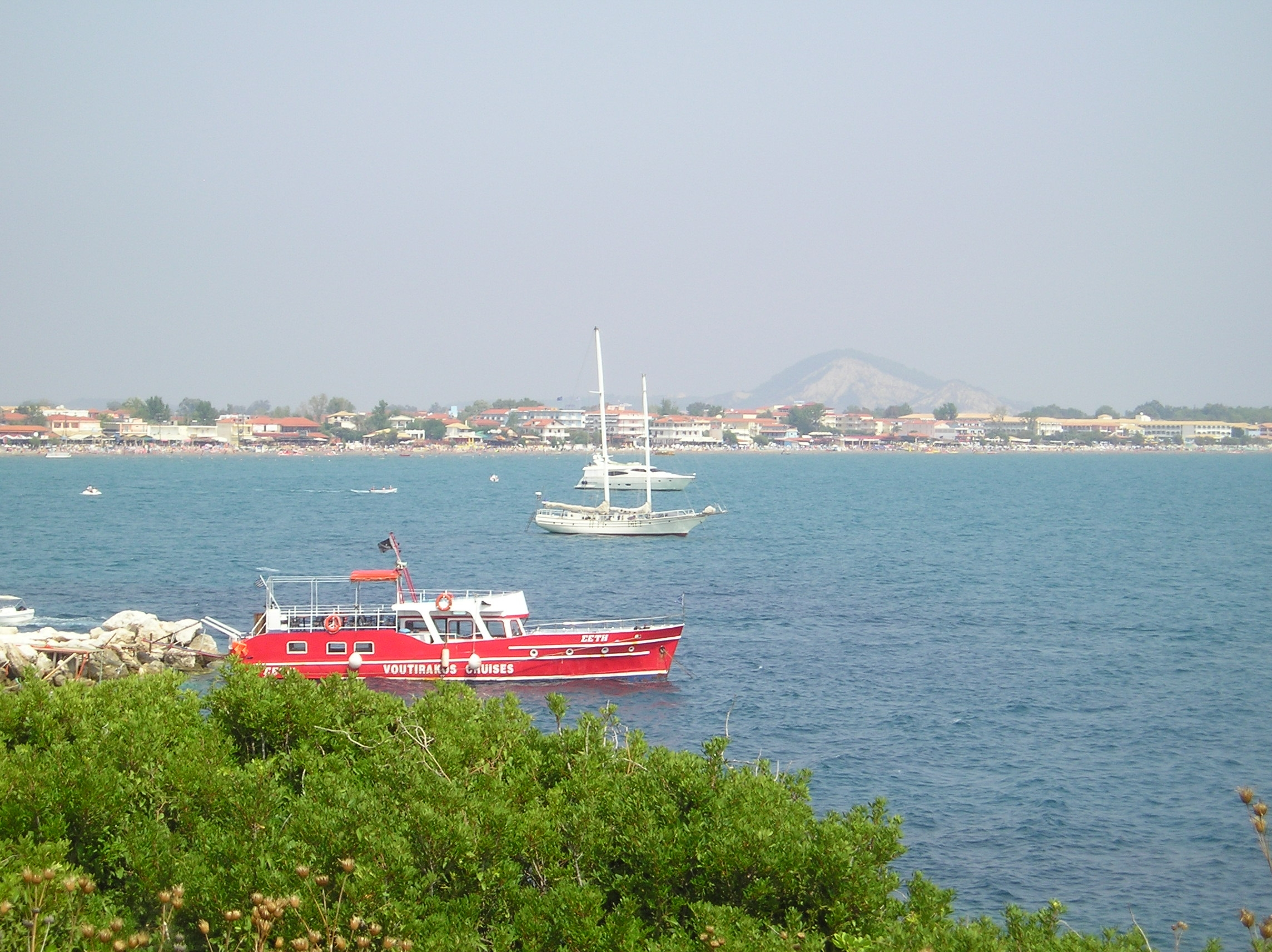
Lagana beach

An attraction of Laganas is the migration of the loggerhead sea turtles (Caretta caretta). Each year during the months of June, July and August the turtles migrate to the Bay of Laganas to lay their eggs on the beach. This is a protected beach which is watched over by ecologists at all times.

Laganas is home to over 100 bars and clubs and is busiest during the summer months of June, July & August.

== Subdivisions ==
The municipal unit Laganas is subdivided into the following communities (constituent villages in brackets):

- Agalas (Agalas, Ai Giannis, Ampelos, Stimies)
- Kalamaki (Kalamaki, Margaraiika, Pefkakia)
- Keri (Keri, Apelati, Limni Keriou, Marathias)
- Lithakia
- Mouzaki
- Pantokratoras (Pantokratoras, Laganas)

== See also ==
- List of settlements in Zakynthos
