= Greek National Road 73 =

Trunk road in Greece

National Road 73
- Εθνική Οδός 73
- Route of the EO73 road, in blue

Route information
- Length: 22.2 km (13.8 mi)
- Existed: 4 August 1995–present

Major junctions
- North end: Thermi
- South end: Kratigos

Location
- Country: Greece
- Regions: North Aegean
- Primary destinations: Thermi; Mytilene; Kratigos

Highway system
- Highways in Greece; Motorways; National roads
← EO72	→ EO74

Greek National Road 73 (Greek: Εθνική Οδός 73), abbreviated as the EO73, is a national road in the North Aegean, Greece. First created in 1955, but unlisted in 1963, it is one of two national roads in the island of Lesbos (the other being the EO36), and runs along the island's east coast via Mytilene.

== Route ==
The EO73 is officially defined as a north–south road along the east coast of Lesbos. The road starts in Thermi to the north, heading south via Mytilene to Kratigos in the south. The EO73 briefly runs concurrently with the EO36 between Mytilene and Panagiouda.

== History ==
The national road was originally defined in 1955 as the EO70, and followed the same route as the current EO36. It was one of three sections of the 1955 national road network to not appear in Ministerial Decision G25871 of 9 July 1963 (the other being the current EO19 north of Neraida, and the Igoumenitsa–Actium National Road between Preveza and Vonitsa), but was later reinstated as the EO73 by Ministerial Decision DMEO/e/oik/827/1995 on 4 August 1995: at the same time, the EO73 south of Panagiouda was subclassified as part of the secondary network, and the section north of said village became part of the tertiary network.
