= Planos =

Village

Planos Πλάνος
- Community
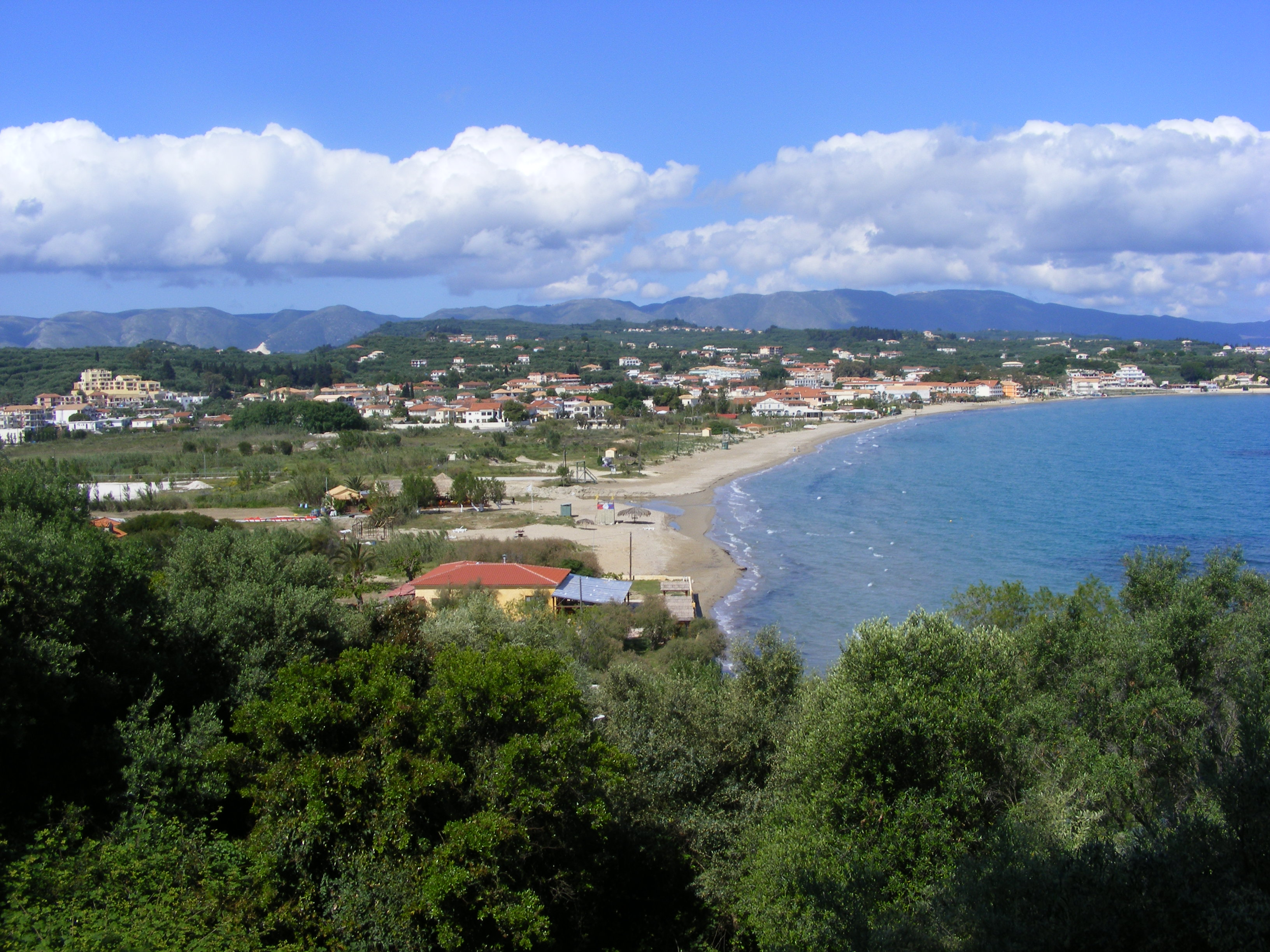

- Location within Greece
- Coordinates: 37°49′01″N 20°51′47″E
- Country: Greece
- Administrative region: Ionian Islands
- Regional unit: Zakynthos
- Municipality: Zakynthos
- Municipal unit: Arkadioi

Population (2021)
  - Community: 1,011
- Time zone: UTC+2 (EET)
  - Summer (DST): UTC+3 (EEST)

Planos (Greek: Πλάνος), also known as Tsilivi (Greek: Τσιλιβή), is a village and a tourist resort on the island of Zakynthos, Greece. It is part of the municipal unit Arkadioi. It is situated on the northeastern coast of the island, about four kilometres northwest of the capital Zakynthos (city). The lively beach resort Tsilivi Beach is part of the community. At the north point of Tsilivi Beach, there exists an old Venetian observatory (called a vardiola (Greek: Βαρδιόλα)).
