= A Zacinto =

19th century Pre-Romantic Sonnet

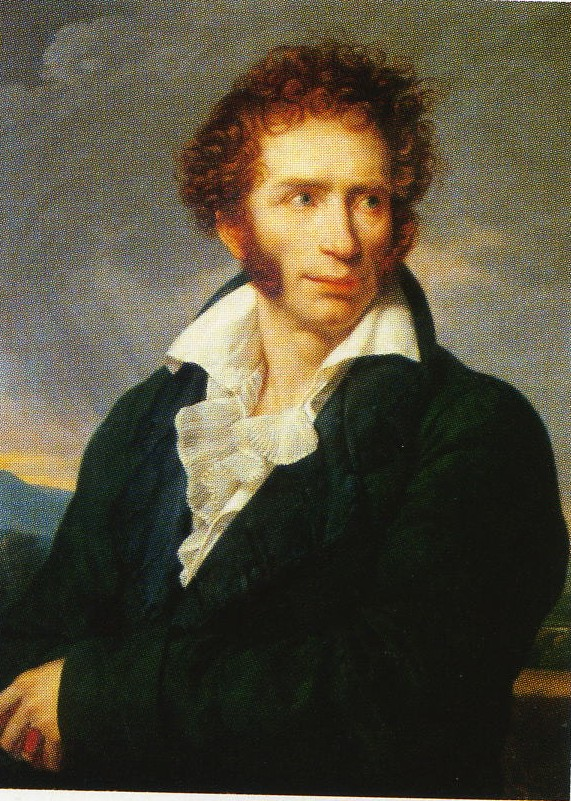
Ugo Foscolo

A Zacinto

Né più mai toccherò le sacre sponde

ove il mio corpo fanciulletto giacque,

Zacinto mia, che te specchi nell'onde

del greco mar da cui vergine nacque

Venere, e fea quelle isole feconde

col suo primo sorriso, onde non tacque

le tue limpide nubi e le tue fronde

l'inclito verso di colui che l'acque

cantò fatali, ed il diverso esiglio

per cui bello di fama e di sventura

baciò la sua petrosa Itaca Ulisse.

Tu non altro che il canto avrai del figlio,

o materna mia terra; a noi prescrisse

il fato illacrimata sepoltura.

A Zacinto (English translation)

Never will I touch your sacred shore again

where my young form reclined at rest,

Zakynthos, regarding yourself in waves

of the Greek sea, where Venus was

virgin born, and made those islands bloom

with her first smile; nor did he bypass

your lacy clouds and leafy fronds

in glorious verse, the one who sang

of fatal seas, and of the broad exile

after which, exalted by fame and by adventure,

Ulysses kissed his rocky native Ithaca.

You will have nothing of your son but his song,

motherland of mine: and our fate already

written, the unmourned grave.

"A Zacinto" (Italian: [a ddzaˈtʃinto]; "To Zakynthos") is a pre-Romantic sonnet written by Ugo Foscolo in 1803.

== Short analysis ==
The sonnet is about the poet's feelings: when he wrote the poem he was in exile, so he knew that his remains would have been buried far away from his natal island, Zante, and nobody would have cried on his grave. The poet compares himself to Odysseus and finds a difference: the Greek hero, after the Trojan War and his long travel to home, returned to Ithaca and was buried there. The word giacque, that is "reclined, lay" (second line), is an anticipation of the theme of death, which the last stanza focuses on.

In the sonnet there are both neoclassical and romantic elements: references to the classical tradition (Aphrodite, Homer and Odysseus) are typical of neoclassicism and the focus on the poet, the theme of graves and remains and the homesickness are typical of romanticism.

== Prosody ==
The sonnet is made up of two quatrains and two tercets of hendecasyllables. The rhyme scheme is ABAB, ABAB, CDE, CED. In the poem we can find enjambments, alliterations, apostrophes, synecdoches, anastrophes and a litotes.
