= Greek National Road 36 =

Trunk road in Greece

National Road 36
- Εθνική Οδός 36
- Route of the EO36 road, in blue

Route information
- Length: 41.3 km (25.7 mi)
- Existed: 9 July 1963–present

Major junctions
- East end: Mytilene
- West end: Kalloni

Location
- Country: Greece
- Regions: North Aegean
- Primary destinations: Mytilene; Kalloni

Highway system
- Highways in Greece; Motorways; National roads
← EO35	→ EO38

Greek National Road 36 (Greek: Εθνική Οδός 36), abbreviated as the EO36, is a national road in the North Aegean, Greece. It is one of two national roads in the island of Lesbos (with the EO73).

== Route ==
The EO36 is officially defined as an east–west road to the east of the island of Lesbos. The road starts in Mytilene and heads west towards Kalloni. The EO36 briefly runs concurrently with the EO73 north of Mytilene, before splitting near Panagiouda.

== History ==
Ministerial Decision G25871 of 9 July 1963 created the EO36 from the old EO69, which existed by royal decree from 1955 until 1963, and followed the same route as the current EO36.
