= Maries, Zakynthos =

Maries Μαριές
- Community
- Location within Greece
- Coordinates: 37°49′08″N 20°40′37″E
- Country: Greece
- Administrative region: Ionian Islands
- Regional unit: Zakynthos
- Municipality: Zakynthos
- Municipal unit: Elatia

Population (2021)
  - Community: 356
- Time zone: UTC+2 (EET)
  - Summer (DST): UTC+3 (EEST)

Maries (Greek: Μαριές) is a mountain settlement on Zakynthos island, Greece. The village itself is named after both Mary Magdalene and Mary of Klopas. Traditional stories tell of Mary Magdalene having dropped anchor at Porto Vromi in order to spread the gospel of Jesus Christ. A footprint believed to belong to Mary Magdalene is shown on one of the rocks on the shore. There exists a 15th-century three-aisled church dedicated to Mary Magdalene.
