= Volimes =

Volimes Βολίμες
- Community
- Location within Greece
- Coordinates: 37°52′N 20°40′E
- Country: Greece
- Administrative region: Ionian Islands
- Regional unit: Zakynthos
- Municipality: Zakynthos
- Municipal unit: Elatia

Population (2021)
  - Community: 534
- Time zone: UTC+2 (EET)
  - Summer (DST): UTC+3 (EEST)

Volimes (Greek: Βολίμες) is a community in the mountainous northwestern part of the Ionian island of Zakynthos. It was the seat of the municipality of Elatia. The community includes the villages Agios Nikolaos, Askos, Varvara, Elies, Korithi and the uninhabited islet Agios Andreas.

Volimes is located 1 km west of Ano Volimes, 3 km north of Anafonitria and 23 km northwest of Zakynthos (city). It is close to the Ionian Sea coast, and 7 km southwest of the island's northernmost point Cape Skinari. The village suffered great damage from the 1953 Ionian earthquake.

== Population ==
Year	Settlement population	Community population
1981	702	-
1991	517	-
2001	644	956
2011	406	571
2021	392	534

== See also ==
- List of settlements in Zakynthos
