= Elatia, Zakynthos =

Elatia Ελάτια
- Municipal unit
- Location within the regional unit

- Location within Greece
- Coordinates: 37°52′N 20°40′E
- Country: Greece
- Administrative region: Ionian Islands
- Regional unit: Zakynthos
- Municipality: Zakynthos

Area
  - Municipal unit: 111.4 km^{2} (43.0 sq mi)

Population (2021)
  - Municipal unit: 1,754
  - Municipal unit density: 15.75/km^{2} (40.78/sq mi)
- Time zone: UTC+2 (EET)
  - Summer (DST): UTC+3 (EEST)
- Vehicle registration: ZA

Elatia (Greek: Ελάτια) is a former municipality on the island of Zakynthos, Ionian Islands, Greece. Since the 2011 local government reform it is part of the municipality Zakynthos, of which it is a municipal unit. It is located in the northwestern part of the island. With a land area of 111.412 km^{2}, it is the largest municipal unit on Zakynthos, comprising about 27 percent of its area. Its population was 1,754 at the 2021 census. The seat of the municipality was in the town of Volimes. The municipal unit consists of the communities Volimes, Anafonitria, Ano Volimes, Exo Chora, Maries and Orthonies.
