= Vanato =

Village in Zakynthos, Greece

Vanato Βανάτο
- Community
- Location within Greece
- Coordinates: 37°47′35″N 20°51′11″E
- Country: Greece
- Administrative region: Ionian Islands
- Regional unit: Zakynthos
- Municipality: Zakynthos
- Municipal unit: Arkadioi

Population (2021)
  - Community: 1,191
- Time zone: UTC+2 (EET)
  - Summer (DST): UTC+3 (EEST)

Vanato (Greek: Βανάτο) is a village in the municipal unit of Arkadioi on the island of Zakynthos, Greece. It is 4 km northwest of Zakynthos (city).
