= Machairado =

Machairado Μαχαιράδο
- Community
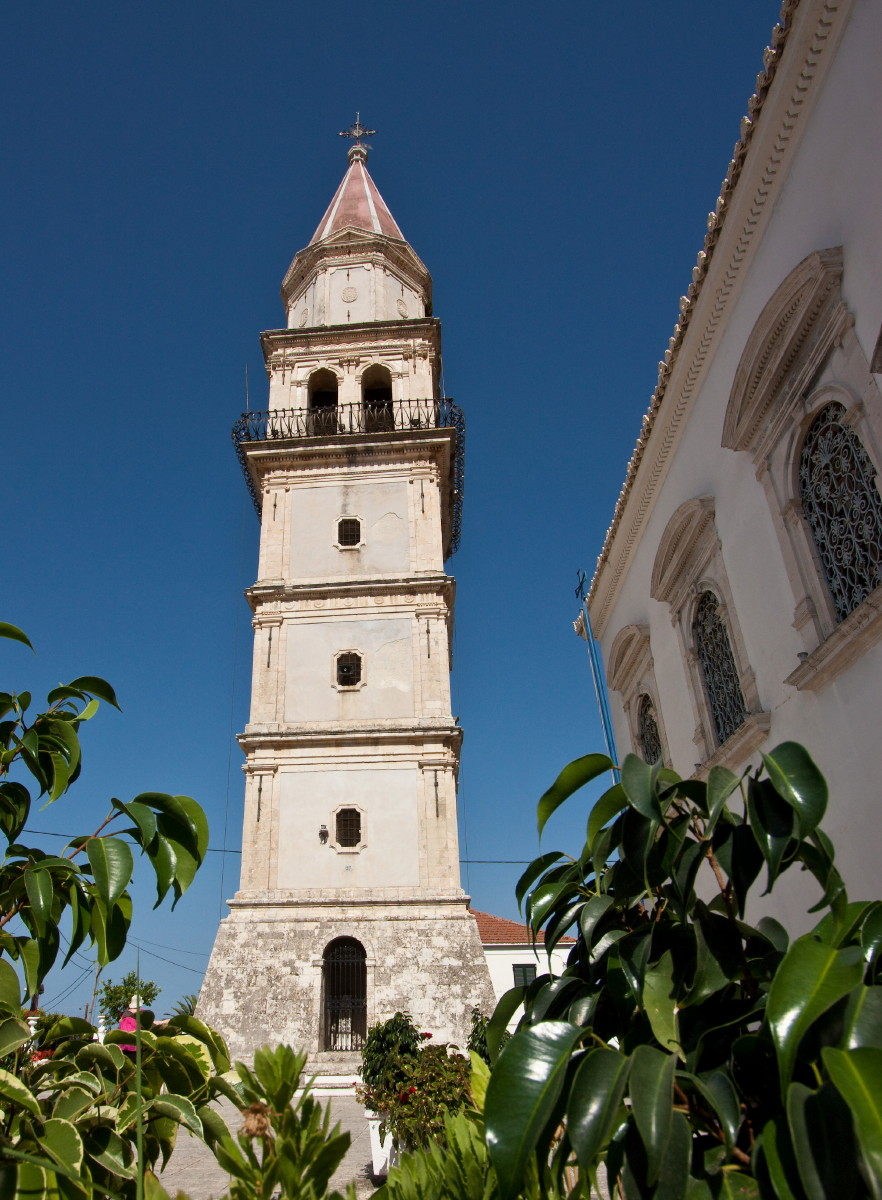

- Location within Greece
- Coordinates: 37°45.5′N 20°48.6′E
- Country: Greece
- Administrative region: Ionian Islands
- Regional unit: Zakynthos
- Municipality: Zakynthos
- Municipal unit: Artemisia

Population (2021)
  - Community: 912
- Time zone: UTC+2 (EET)
  - Summer (DST): UTC+3 (EEST)
- Vehicle registration: ZA

Machairado (Greek: Μαχαιράδο) is a village in the central part of the island of Zakynthos, Greece. It was the seat of the municipality of Artemisia. It is situated at the foot of low mountains, 1 km north of Lagopodo, 3 km northeast of Koiliomenos and 8 km southwest of Zakynthos (city). The village suffered great damage from the 1953 Ionian earthquake.

== Population ==
Year	Population
1981	789
1991	796
2001	925
2011	941
2021	912

== See also ==
- List of settlements in Zakynthos
