= Lagopodo =

Lagopodo Λαγώποδο
- Community
- Location within Greece
- Coordinates: 37°45′11″N 20°48′43″E
- Country: Greece
- Administrative region: Ionian Islands
- Regional unit: Zakynthos
- Municipality: Zakynthos
- Municipal unit: Artemisia

Population (2021)
  - Community: 478
- Time zone: UTC+2 (EET)
  - Summer (DST): UTC+3 (EEST)

Lagopodo (Greek: Λαγώποδο) is a settlement on Zakynthos island, Greece. Its population is 478 (2021 census).
