= Agalas =

Agalas Αγαλάς
- Community
- Location within Greece
- Coordinates: 37°43′N 20°47′E
- Country: Greece
- Administrative region: Ionian Islands
- Regional unit: Zakynthos
- Municipality: Zakynthos
- Municipal unit: Laganas

Population (2021)
  - Community: 284
- Time zone: UTC+2 (EET)
  - Summer (DST): UTC+3 (EEST)

Agalas (Greek: Αγαλάς) is a village near the southwest coast of Zakynthos, spread over hills facing the Ionian Sea. Local places of interest include the Damianos caves, the Venetian Antronios wells, the Plakaki coast, the Vau Canyon, the squares of the windmills and views of the Ionian Sea.

The name "Agalas" exists in various forms; the most prevalent is the name derived from the word Rejoice (agallio in Greek), then is agallia became Agala, means feeling emotional happiness.
