= Loucha =

Loucha Λούχα
- Community
- Location within Greece
- Coordinates: 37°47′42″N 20°43′30″E
- Country: Greece
- Administrative region: Ionian Islands
- Regional unit: Zakynthos
- Municipality: Zakynthos
- Municipal unit: Artemisia

Population (2021)
  - Community: 44
- Time zone: UTC+2 (EET)
  - Summer (DST): UTC+3 (EEST)

Loucha (Greek: Λούχα) is a settlement on Zakynthos island, Greece.
