= Kalamaki, Zakynthos =

Kalamaki Καλαμάκι
- Community
- Location within Greece
- Coordinates: 37°44′35″N 20°53′49″E
- Country: Greece
- Administrative region: Ionian Islands
- Regional unit: Zakynthos
- Municipality: Zakynthos
- Municipal unit: Laganas

Population (2021)
  - Community: 1,226
- Time zone: UTC+2 (EET)
  - Summer (DST): UTC+3 (EEST)

Kalamaki (Greek: Καλαμάκι) is the name of a beach resort town on the Greek island of Zakynthos. It is located approximately 3 km northeast of the busy resort of Laganas, although despite the close proximity it maintains a much more relaxed atmosphere than its neighbour. It has experienced rapid growth in recent years, due to the growing influx of tourism with the number of charter flights to the area increasing twentyfold between 1983 and 1993.

It is located on the south of the island, in the Bay of Laganas. The beach at Kalamaki is also a nesting place for the endangered loggerhead sea turtle. As a consequence, the Greek government declared the beach as part of the National Marine Park of Zakynthos. The Greek parliament had previously protected the area through the development of legislation in 1986. This led to beachgoing being banned at night, and sports such as water skiing being likewise banned.
