= Zakynthos (city) =

Zakynthos Ζάκυνθος
- Municipal unit
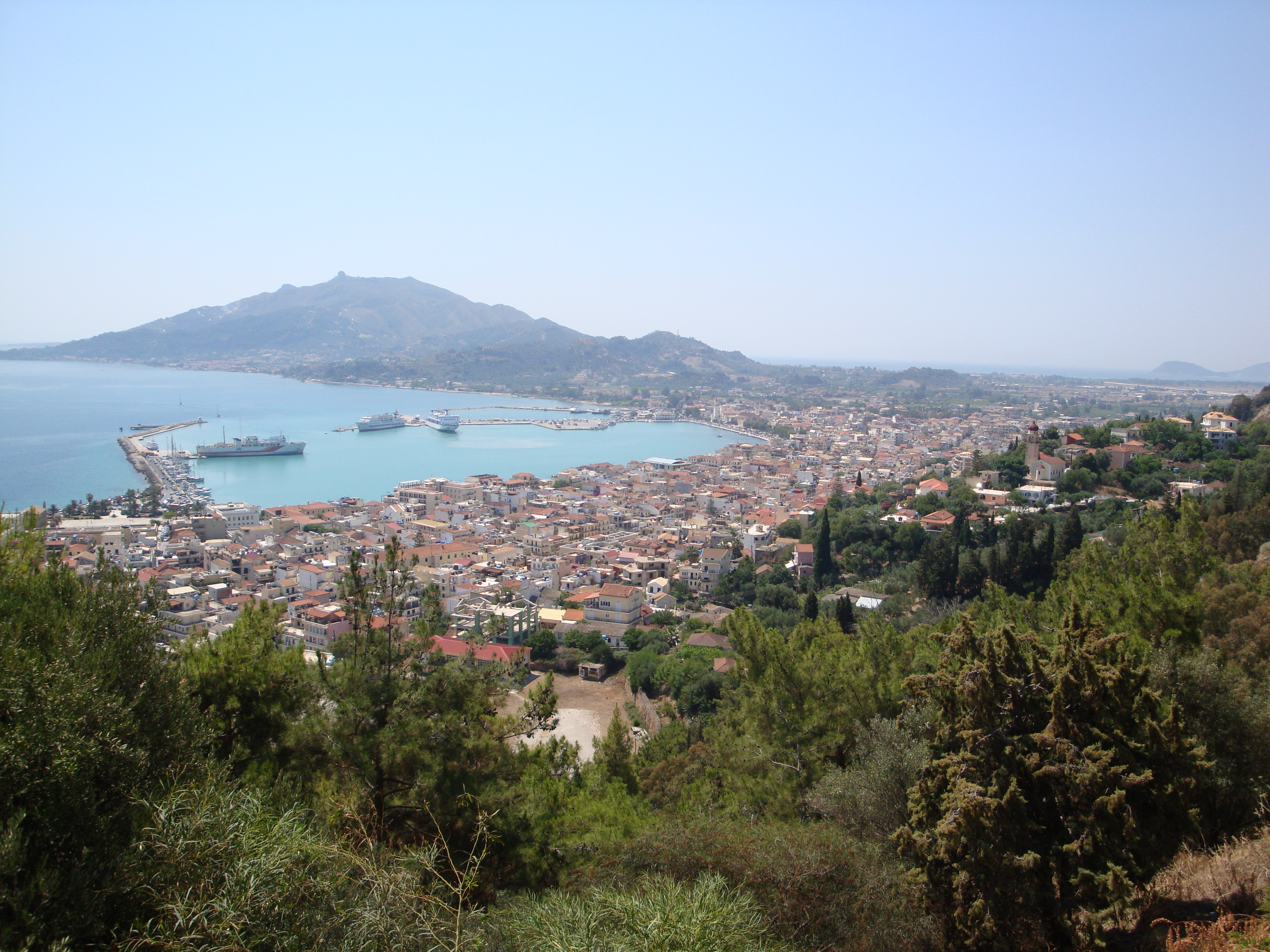
- Panorama of Zakynthos

- Seal

- Location within the regional unit

- Location within Greece
- Coordinates: 37°47′N 20°54′E
- Country: Greece
- Administrative region: Ionian Islands
- Regional unit: Zakynthos
- Municipality: Zakynthos

Area
  - Municipal unit: 45.79 km^{2} (17.68 sq mi)
- Elevation: 10 m (33 ft)

Population (2021)
  - Municipal unit: 16,996
  - Municipal unit density: 371.2/km^{2} (961.3/sq mi)
  - Community: 9,760
- Time zone: UTC+2 (EET)
  - Summer (DST): UTC+3 (EEST)
- Postal code: 291 00
- Area code: 26950
- Vehicle registration: ΖΑ
- Website: www.zakynthion.gov.gr

Zakynthos (Greek: Ζάκυνθος, romanized: Zákynthos [ˈzacinθos]) or Zante (Greek: Τζάντε, romanized: Tzánte), is a city and a former municipality on the island of Zakynthos, Ionian Islands, Greece. Since the 2011 local government reform it is part of the municipality Zakynthos, of which it is a municipal unit. It is the capital of the island of Zakynthos. Apart from the official name Zakynthos, it is also called Chora (i.e. the Town), a common denomination in Greece when the name of the island itself is the same as the name of the principal town.

The municipal unit of Zákynthos lies in the easternmost part of the island and has a land area of 45.79 square kilometres (17.68 square miles) and a population of 16,996 at the 2021 census. It is subdivided into the communities Zakynthos, Ampelokipoi, Argasi, Vasilikos, Gaitani and Bochali. The municipal unit also includes the Strofades islands, which lie about 50 kilometres (31 miles) south of Zákynthos island.

== Tourism ==
Zakynthos City, while not hosting many resorts itself, attracts tourists from across the island for boat trips, nightlife and food. It is popular with Europeans, particularly Croatian and British tourists.

== Notable people ==
- Dionysios (16th century), patron saint of Zakynthos
- Pavlos Carrer (1829–1896), composer
- Ugo Foscolo (1778–1827), writer, revolutionary and poet
- Andreas Kalvos (1792–1869), poet
- Dionysios Solomos (1798–1857), poet

== International relations ==
Zakynthos is twinned with:

- Limassol, Cyprus
- Serravalle, San Marino
- Kiryat Bialik, Israel
- Guadalajara, Mexico
