= Zakynthos =

Greek island in the Ionian Sea

Zakynthos Ζάκυνθος
- Regional unit and municipality
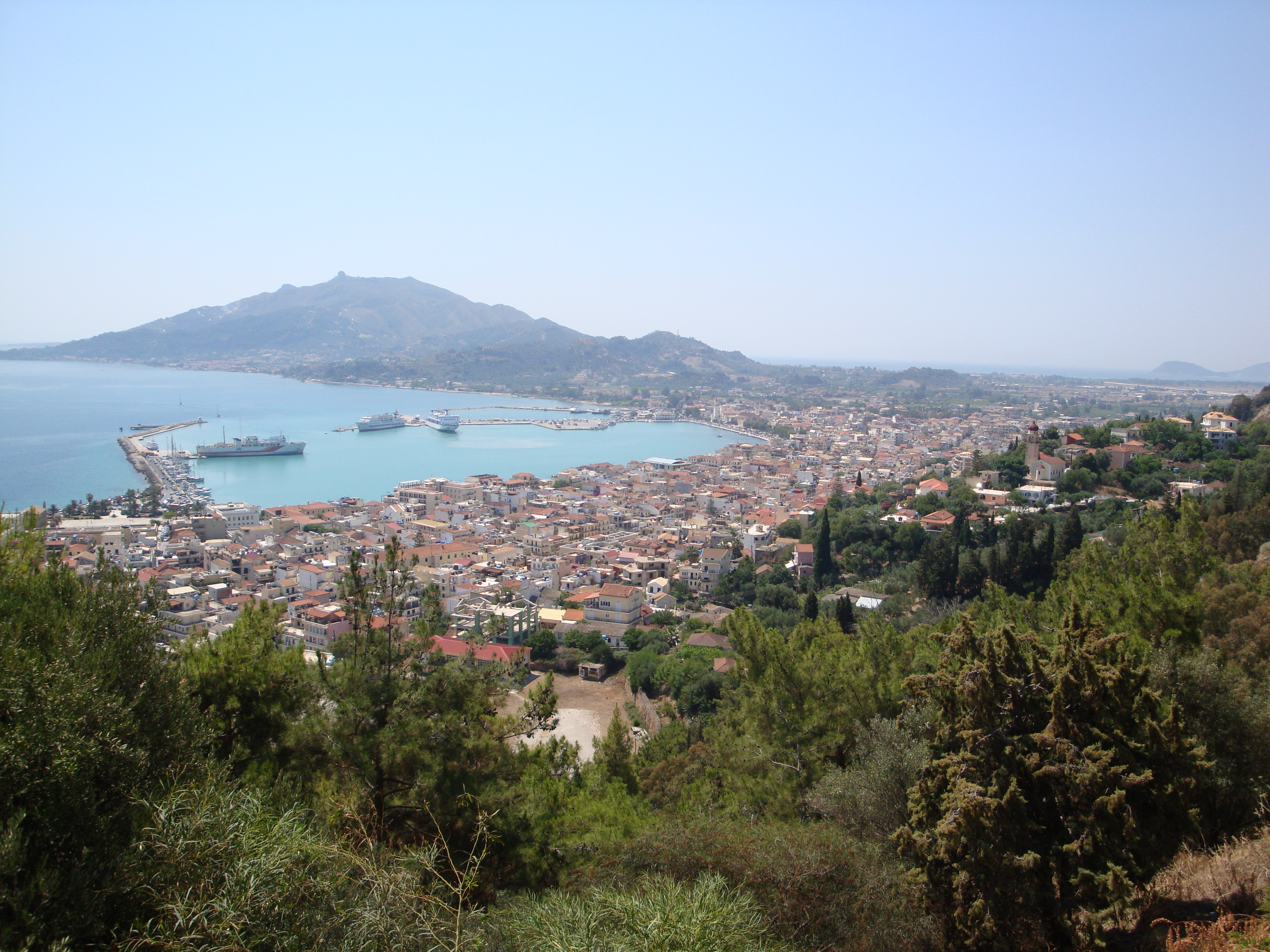
- View of Zakynthos city

- Flag

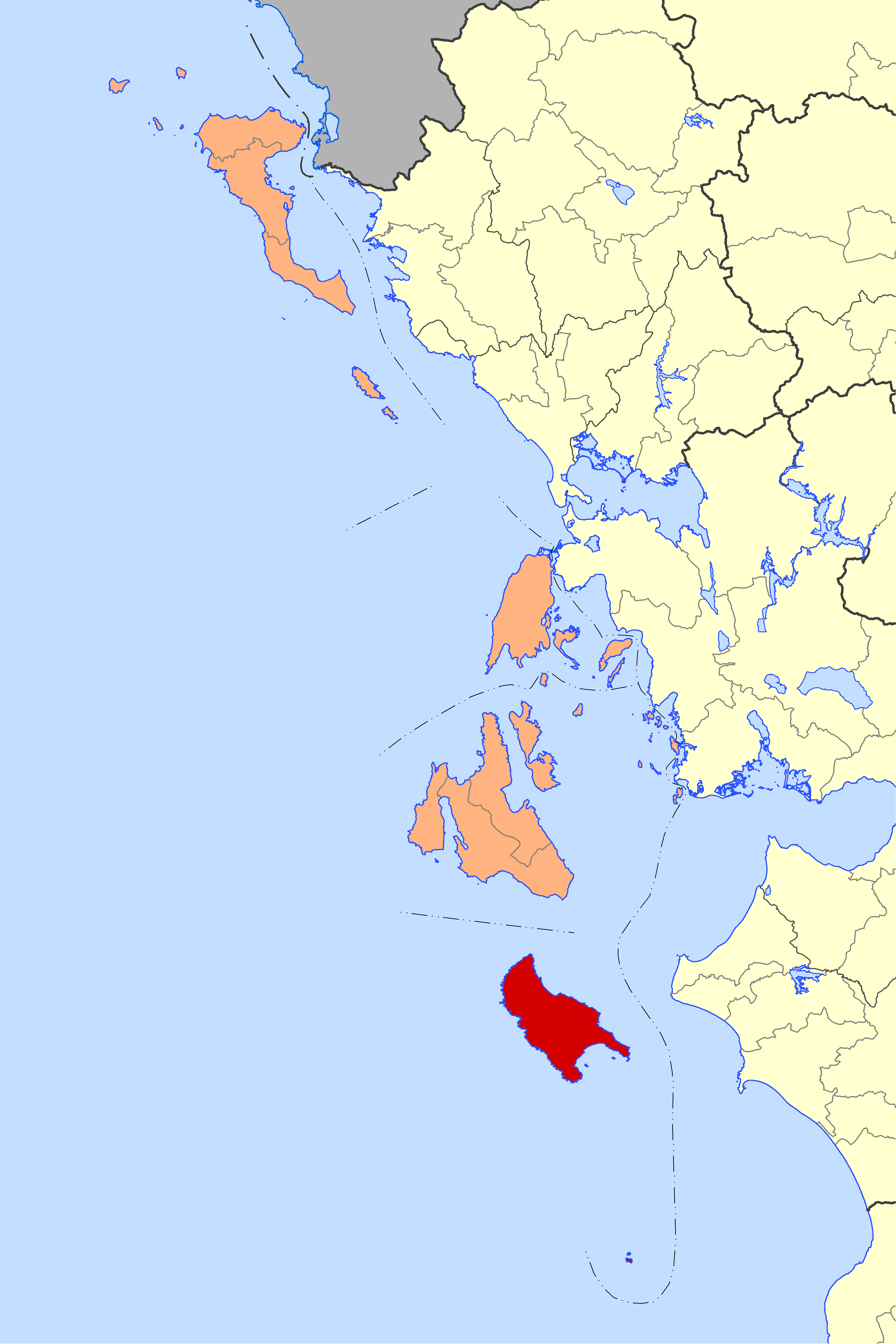
- Zakynthos within the Ionian Islands

- Location within Greece
- Coordinates: 37°48′N 20°45′E
- Country: Greece
- Administrative region: Ionian Islands
- Seat: Zakynthos (city)

Government
  - Mayor: Georgios Stasinopoulos (since 2023)

Area
  - Municipality: 405.55 km^{2} (156.58 sq mi)

Population (2021)
  - Municipality: 41,180
  - Density: 101.5/km^{2} (263.0/sq mi)
- Time zone: UTC+2 (EET)
  - Summer (DST): UTC+3 (EEST)
- Postal code: 29x xx
- Area code: 2695
- Vehicle registration: ΖΑ
- Website: www.zakynthos.gov.gr

Zakynthos, (Note: Also spelled Zakinthos, and traditionally latinized as Zacynthus. Greek: Ζάκυνθος (romanized: Zákynthos), pronounced [ˈzacinθos]; Italian: Zacinto, pronounced [dzaˈtʃinto].) also known as Zante, (Note: The Venetian name, pronounced [ˈdzante] in Italian and /ˈzænti/ or /ˈzɑːnteɪ/ in English. The Greek form is Τζάντε (romanized: Tzánte), pronounced [ˈdza(n)de].) is a Greek island in the Ionian Sea. It is the third largest of the Ionian Islands, with an area of 405.55 km^{2} (156.6 sq mi), and a coastline 123 km (76 mi) in length. In Greek mythology, the island was said to be named after Zacynthus, the son of the legendary Arcadian chief Dardanus.

Zakynthos is a tourist destination, with an international airport served by charter flights from northern Europe. The island's nickname is "Fiore di Levante" (Flower of the East), bestowed upon it by the Venetians, who ruled Zakynthos from 1484 to 1797.

== History ==
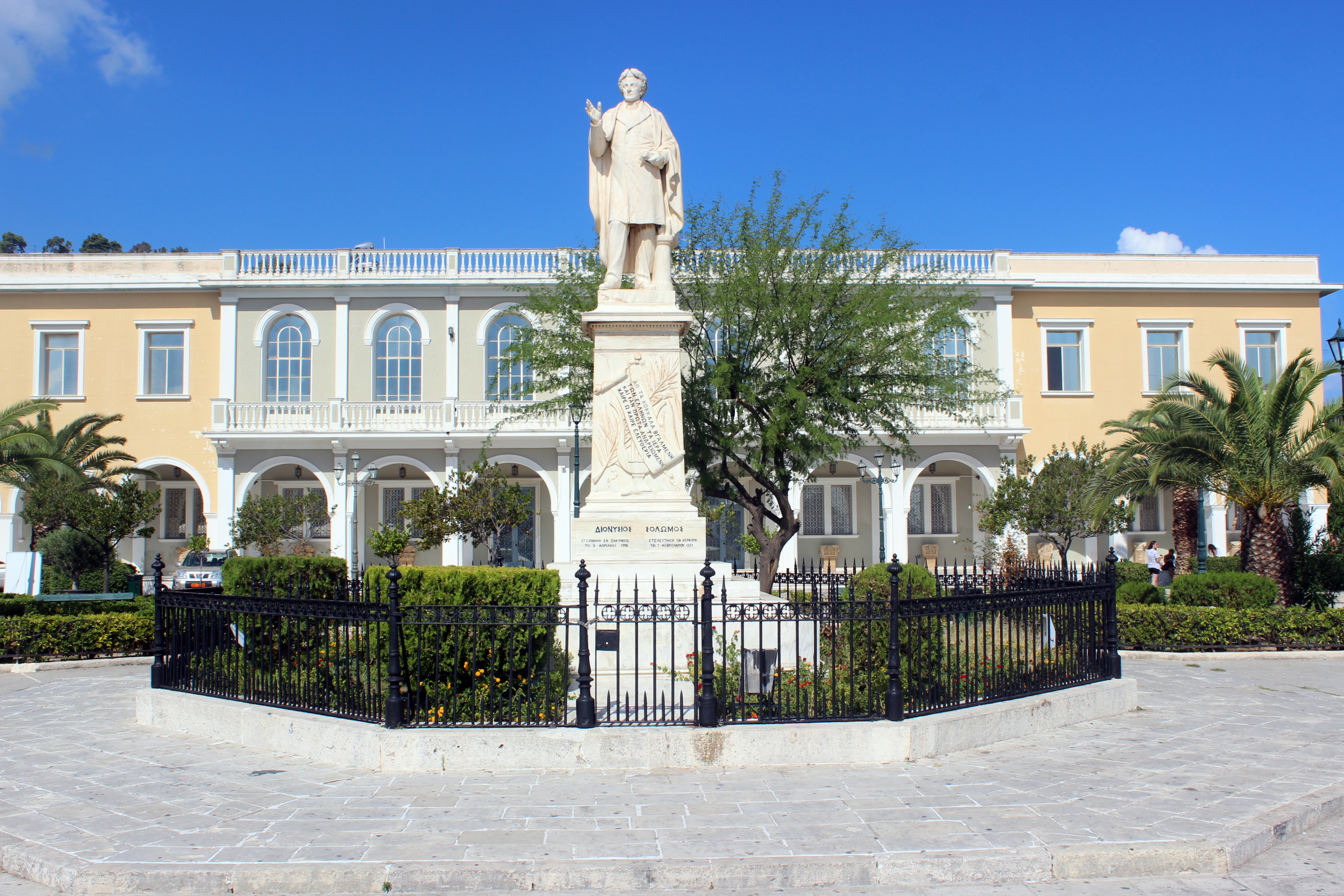
Statue of Dionysios Solomos with the Byzantine museum in the background

=== Ancient history ===
The ancient Greek poet Homer mentioned Zakynthos in the Iliad and the Odyssey, stating that its first inhabitants were the son of King Dardanos of Arcadia, called Zakynthos, and his men. Before being renamed Zakynthos, the island was said to have been called Hyrie. Zakynthos was then conquered by King Arkesios of Kefalonia, and then by Odysseus from Ithaca. Zakynthos participated in the Trojan War and is listed in the Homeric Catalogue of Ships, which, if accurate, describes the geopolitical situation in early Greece at some time between the Late Bronze Age and the eighth century BC. In the Odyssey, Homer mentions 20 nobles from Zakynthos among a total of 108 of Penelope's suitors.

Pausanias writes that the acropolis of Zacynthus was called Psophis because the first man to sail to the island was Zacynthus, the son of Dardanus of Psophis, who became its founder. Stephanus of Byzantium also states that the colony on the island was named Zacynthus after him.

The Athenian military commander Tolmides concluded an alliance with Zakynthos during the First Peloponnesian War, some time between 459 and 446 BC. In 430 BC, the Lacedaemonians led a force of about 1,000 heavy infantry, led by the Spartan admiral Cnemus, in an attack upon Zakynthos. Although the attackers managed to burn much of the surrounding countryside, the city itself refused to surrender, and the attack ultimately failed. The Zakynthians are then enumerated among the autonomous allies of Athens in the disastrous Sicilian expedition. After the Peloponnesian War, Zakynthos seems to have passed under the supremacy of Sparta because in 374 BC, Timotheus, an Athenian commander, on his return from Kerkyra, landed some Zakynthian exiles on the island and assisted them in establishing a fortified post. These exiles must have belonged to the anti-Spartan party, as the Zakynthian rulers applied for help to the Spartans, who sent a fleet of 25 to the island.

The importance of this alliance for Athens was that it provided them with a source of tar. Tar is a more effective protector of ship planking than pitch (which is made from pine trees). The Athenian trireme fleet needed protection from rot, decay, and the teredo, so this new source of tar was valuable to them. The tar was dredged up from the bottom of a lake (now known as Lake Keri) using leafy myrtle branches tied to the ends of poles. It was then collected in pots and could be carried to the beach and swabbed directly onto ship hulls. Alternatively, the tar could be shipped to the Athenian naval yard at Piraeus for storage.In addition to tar and miltos, the Athenians sourced timber for shipbuilding from various regions, as Greece's limited forest resources necessitated the import of quality wood. This practice ensured a steady supply of essential materials for constructing and maintaining their naval fleet.

Philip V of Macedon seized Zakynthos in the early 3rd century BC, when it was a member of the Aetolian League. In 211 BC, the Roman praetor Marcus Valerius Laevinus took the city of Zakynthos except for the citadel. It was afterwards restored to Philip V of Macedon. The Roman general Marcus Fulvius Nobilior finally conquered Zakynthos in 191 BC for Rome. In the Mithridatic War, it was attacked by Archelaus, the general of Mithridates, but he was repulsed.

=== Medieval period ===
In 459, the island was plundered by the Vandals under Geiseric, who carried off 500 local aristocrats. Zakynthos appears to have been spared from the Slavic invasions of the 6th–7th centuries, as no Slavic names are attested on the island.

During the middle Byzantine period (7th–12th centuries), Zakynthos belonged to the Theme of Cephallenia, and the local bishopric was likewise a suffragan of Cephallenia (and later of the Metropolis of Corinth). In 880, the Aghlabids raided Zakynthos, but were defeated by the Byzantine navy under Nasar. Plundered by the Pisans in 1099, it was captured by Margaritus of Brindisi in 1185, and thereafter formed part of the County Palatine of Cephalonia and Zakynthos. A Latin bishopric was installed on the island, alongside the Orthodox one.

=== Venetian period and modern era ===
By 1460, and during the reign of Mehmed II, the Ottoman Turks eventually controlled most of the Peloponnese with the exception of the remaining Venetian-controlled towns of Argos, Nafplio, Monemvassia, Methoni, and Koroni. After the collapse of the Hexamilion, which was supposed to act as a defense across the Isthmus of Corinth, and hence, protect the Peloponnese, Leonardo III Tocco agreed with Venice to accept 10,000 refugees from this region. Leonardo III Tocco and his realm were increasingly vulnerable to Ottoman Turkish attacks. These refugees consisted of Greeks, Arvanites, and some Venetian officials. Zakynthos was captured by the Ottoman Empire in 1478 but was conquered by the Republic of Venice in 1482. It remained in Venetian hands, as part of the Venetian Ionian Islands, until the Fall of the Republic of Venice in 1797. It then passed successively under French rule, became part of the autonomous Septinsular Republic in 1800, and returned to the French in 1807. Seized by the British in 1809, it formed part of the United States of the Ionian Islands until the Union of the Ionian Islands with Greece in 1864.

==== World War II ====
During the Axis occupation of Greece, Mayor Loukas Karrer and Bishop Chrysostomos Dimitriou refused German orders to turn in a list of the members of the town's Jewish community for deportation to the death camps. Instead, they hid all (or most) of the town's Jewish people in rural villages. According to some sources, all 275 Jews of Zakynthos survived the war. Both were later recognized as Righteous among the Nations by Yad Vashem. In contrast, over 80% of Greek Jews were deported to death camps and murdered in the Holocaust.

=== Earthquakes ===
Zakynthos was hit by a 7.3-magnitude earthquake on 12 August 1953, destroying most of the buildings on the island. Subsequently, all buildings have been strengthened to protect against further tremors. On 26 October 2018, a 6.4-magnitude earthquake south of the island caused no injuries, but damaged the local pier and a 13th-century monastery.

== Geography ==
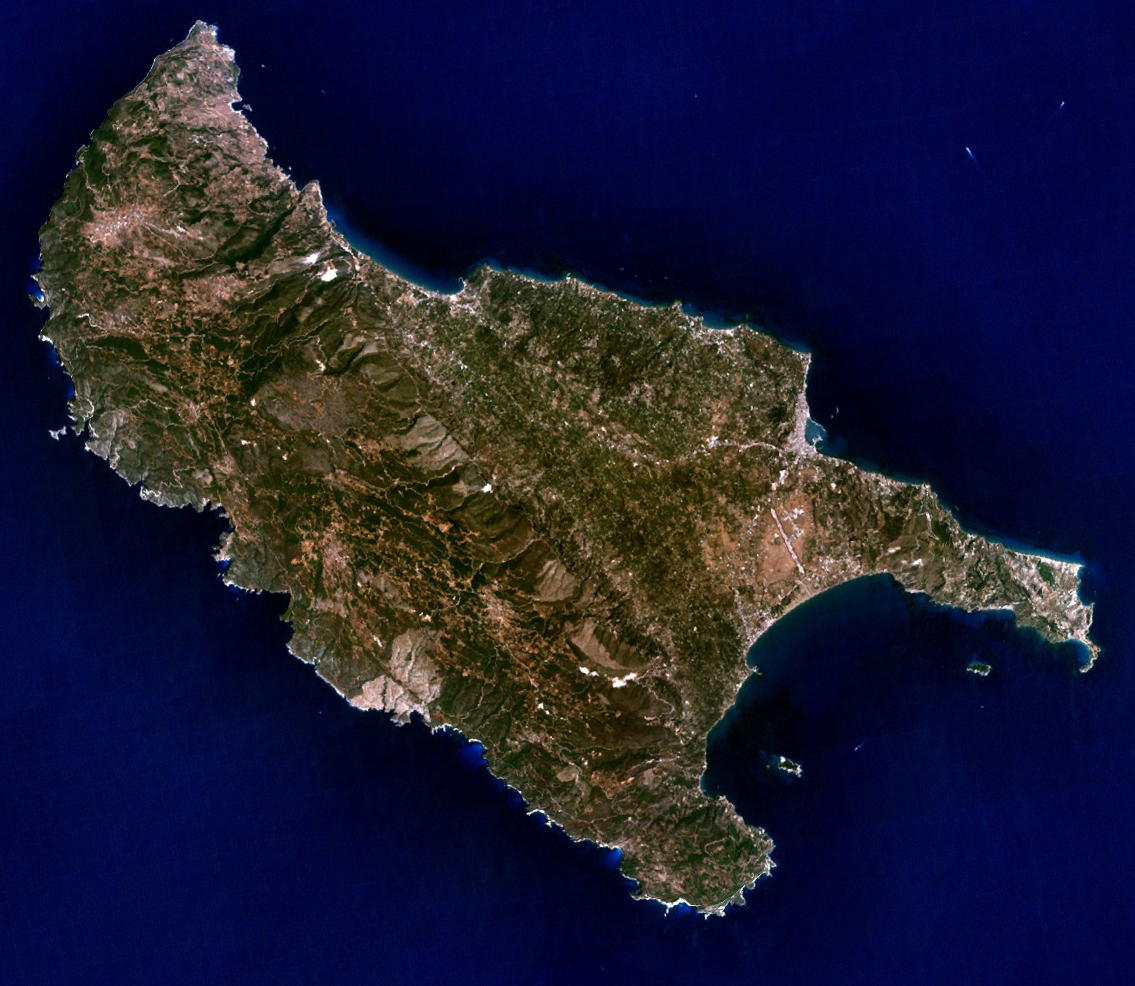
Satellite picture of Zakynthos

Zakynthos lies in the eastern part of the Ionian Sea, around 20 kilometres (12 miles) west of the Greek (Peloponnese) mainland. The island of Kefalonia lies 15 kilometres (9 miles) to the north. It is the southernmost of the main group of the Ionian islands (not counting distant Kythira). Zakynthos is about 40 kilometres (25 miles) long and 20 kilometres (12 miles) wide, and covers an area of 405.55 km^{2} (156.58 sq mi). Its coastline is approximately 123 km (76 mi) long. According to the 2011 census, the island has a population of 40,759. The highest point is Vrachionas, at 758 metres (2,487 feet).

Zakynthos has the shape of an arrowhead, with the "tip" (Cape Skinari) pointing northwest. The western half of the island is a mountainous plateau, and the southwest coast consists mostly of steep cliffs. The eastern half is a densely populated, fertile plain with long sandy beaches, interrupted by several isolated hills, notably Bochali, which overlooks the city and the peninsula of Vasilikos in the northeast. The peninsulas of Vassilikos to the north and Marathia to the south enclose the wide and shallow bay of Laganas on the southeast part of the island.

The capital, which has the same name as the prefecture, is the town of Zakynthos. It lies on the eastern part of the northern coast. Apart from the official name, it is also called Chora (i.e., the Town, a common denomination in Greece when the name of the island itself is the same as the name of the principal town). The port of Zakynthos has a ferry connecting to the port of Kyllini on the mainland. Another ferry connects the village of Agios Nikolaos to Argostoli on Kefalonia. Minor uninhabited islands around Zakynthos included in the municipality and regional unit are: Marathonisi, Pelouzo, Agios Sostis in the Laganas bay, Agios Nikolaos near the eponymous harbor on the northern tip, and Agios Ioannis near Porto Vromi on the western coast.

=== Flora and fauna ===
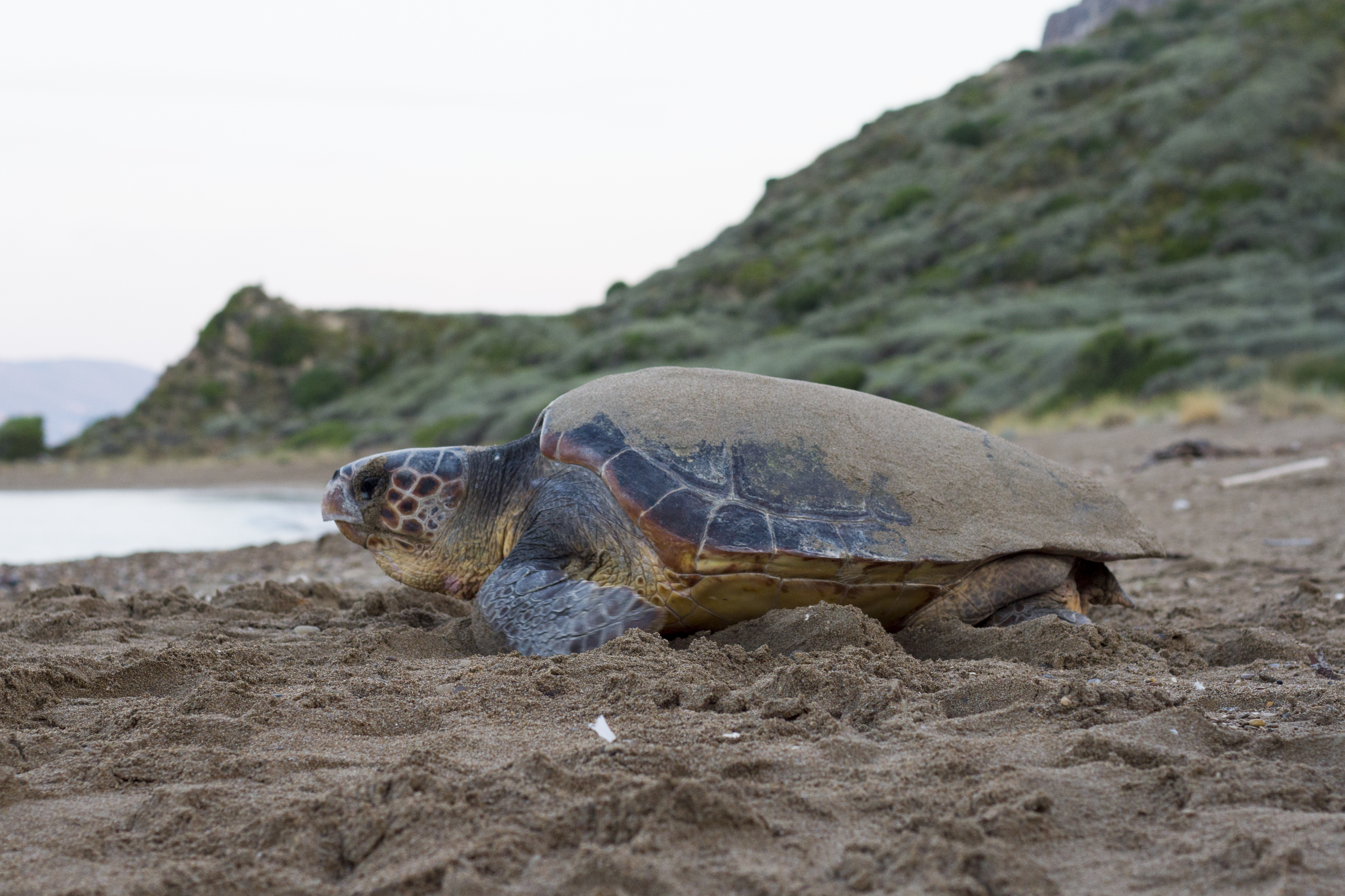
Loggerhead sea turtle in Zakynthos

The mild Mediterranean climate and plentiful winter rainfall endow the island with dense vegetation. The principal agricultural products are olive oil, currants, grapes and citrus fruit. The Zante currant is a small, sweet, seedless grape that is native to the island.

The Bay of Laganas is the site of the first National Marine Park and the prime nesting area for loggerhead sea turtles (Caretta caretta) in the Mediterranean.

=== Climate ===
Zakynthos has a hot-summer Mediterranean climate (Csa) with hot, dry summers and mild to cool, rainy winters. Like most of the Ionian Islands, it receives sizeable amounts of precipitation during the winter, while the summers are mostly hot and sunny. The average annual temperature stands at around 18.5 °C (65.3 °F) while humidity is fairly high throughout the year, even during the summer months.

Climate data for Zakynthos 1961–1990 (extremes 1961–present)
Month	Jan	Feb	Mar	Apr	May	Jun	Jul	Aug	Sep	Oct	Nov	Dec	Year
Record high °C (°F)	20.2 (68.4)	22.8 (73.0)	24.2 (75.6)	29.8 (85.6)	35.0 (95.0)	39.4 (102.9)	42.2 (108.0)	40.0 (104.0)	36.8 (98.2)	32.0 (89.6)	26.6 (79.9)	22.2 (72.0)	42.2 (108.0)
Mean daily maximum °C (°F)	14.4 (57.9)	14.5 (58.1)	16.1 (61.0)	18.9 (66.0)	23.4 (74.1)	27.8 (82.0)	30.7 (87.3)	30.6 (87.1)	27.6 (81.7)	23.0 (73.4)	19.0 (66.2)	15.8 (60.4)	21.8 (71.2)
Daily mean °C (°F)	11.3 (52.3)	11.5 (52.7)	12.9 (55.2)	15.5 (59.9)	19.8 (67.6)	24.1 (75.4)	26.7 (80.1)	26.6 (79.9)	23.8 (74.8)	19.6 (67.3)	15.8 (60.4)	12.8 (55.0)	18.4 (65.1)
Mean daily minimum °C (°F)	8.1 (46.6)	8.2 (46.8)	9.2 (48.6)	11.1 (52.0)	14.4 (57.9)	18.2 (64.8)	20.4 (68.7)	20.9 (69.6)	18.8 (65.8)	15.7 (60.3)	12.5 (54.5)	9.6 (49.3)	13.9 (57.0)
Record low °C (°F)	−2.6 (27.3)	−2.0 (28.4)	0.0 (32.0)	2.6 (36.7)	5.0 (41.0)	8.4 (47.1)	12.0 (53.6)	13.4 (56.1)	10.0 (50.0)	5.2 (41.4)	2.8 (37.0)	0.2 (32.4)	−2.6 (27.3)
Average precipitation mm (inches)	150.4 (5.92)	112.8 (4.44)	89.6 (3.53)	51.3 (2.02)	17.0 (0.67)	7.2 (0.28)	5.0 (0.20)	9.1 (0.36)	25.4 (1.00)	146.5 (5.77)	159.1 (6.26)	169.9 (6.69)	943.3 (37.14)
Average precipitation days (≥ 1.0 mm)	12.8	11.3	8.2	6.1	2.5	1.1	0.5	0.9	2.8	8.1	11.0	13.2	78.5
Average relative humidity (%)	74.3	72.8	72.8	71.7	67.8	62.8	59.3	61.2	66.7	71.7	76.0	75.3	69.4
Source: NOAA, Info Climat extremes 1991-present

=== Sights ===
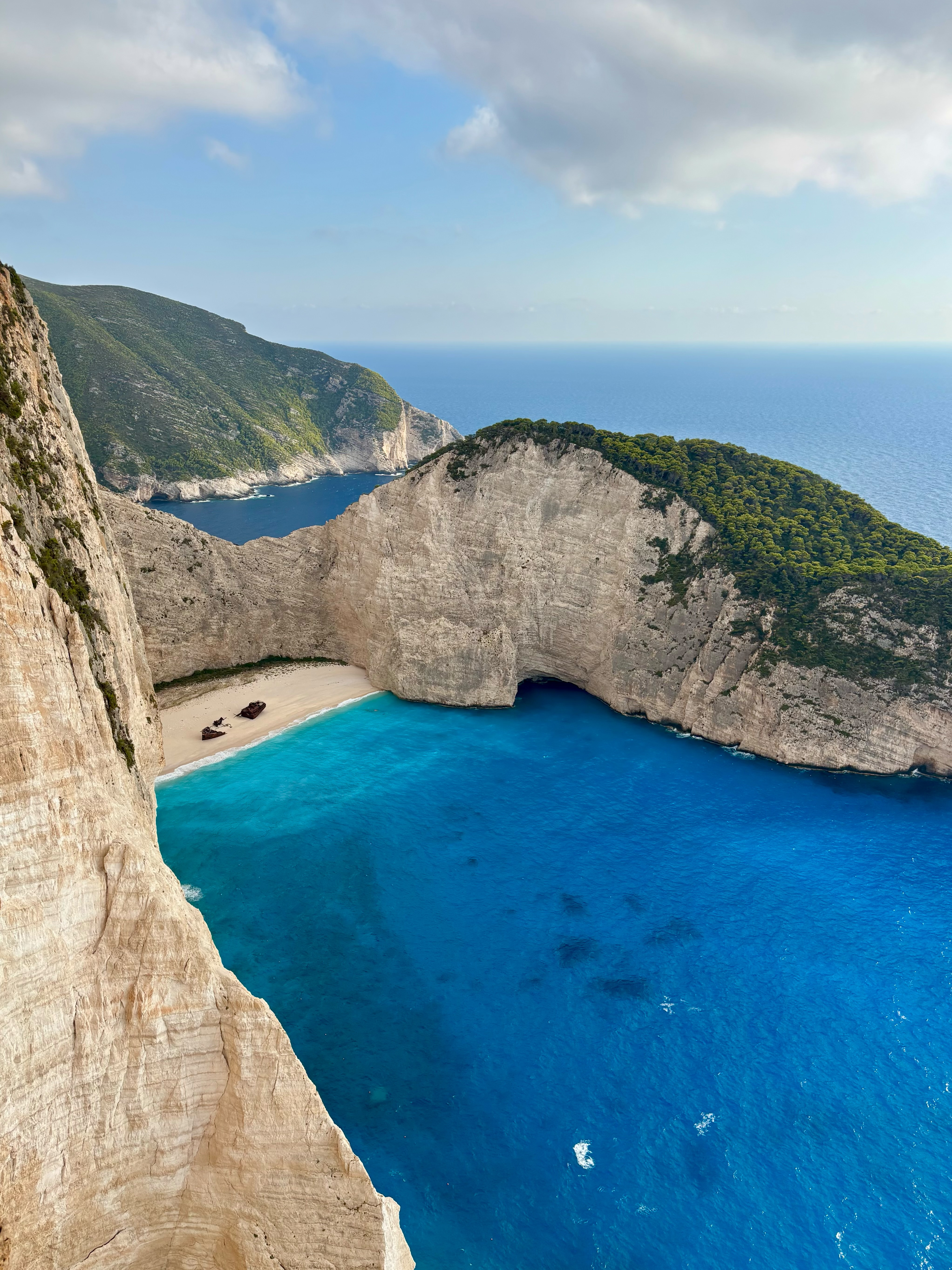
Navagio (shipwreck) bay

Famous landmarks include the Navagio beach, a cove on the northwest shore isolated by high cliffs and accessible only by boat. Numerous natural "blue caves" are carved into the cliffs around Cape Skinari; they are accessible only by small boats, which are popular among tourists. Keri, on the south of the island, is a mountain village with a lighthouse. The whole western shore from Keri to Skinari contains rock formations including arches.

The northern and eastern shores feature numerous wide sandy beaches, some of which attract tourists in the summer months. The largest resort is Laganas. Marathonissi islet (also known as "Turtle Island") near Limni Keriou has tropical vegetation, turquoise waters, beaches, and sea caves. Bochali hill above Zakynthos town contains a small Venetian castle.

== Administration ==
Zakynthos is a separate regional unit of the Ionian Islands region, and the only municipality of the regional unit. The seat of administration is Zakynthos, the main town of the island.

=== Regional unit ===
As a part of the 2011 Kallikratis government reform, the regional unit Zakynthos was created out of the former prefecture Zakynthos (Greek: Νομός Ζακύνθου). The prefecture had the same territory as the present regional unit. In the same reform, the current municipality Zakynthos was created out of the six former municipalities:

- Zakynthos (city)
- Alykes
- Arkadioi
- Artemisia
- Elatia
- Laganas

== Population and demographics ==
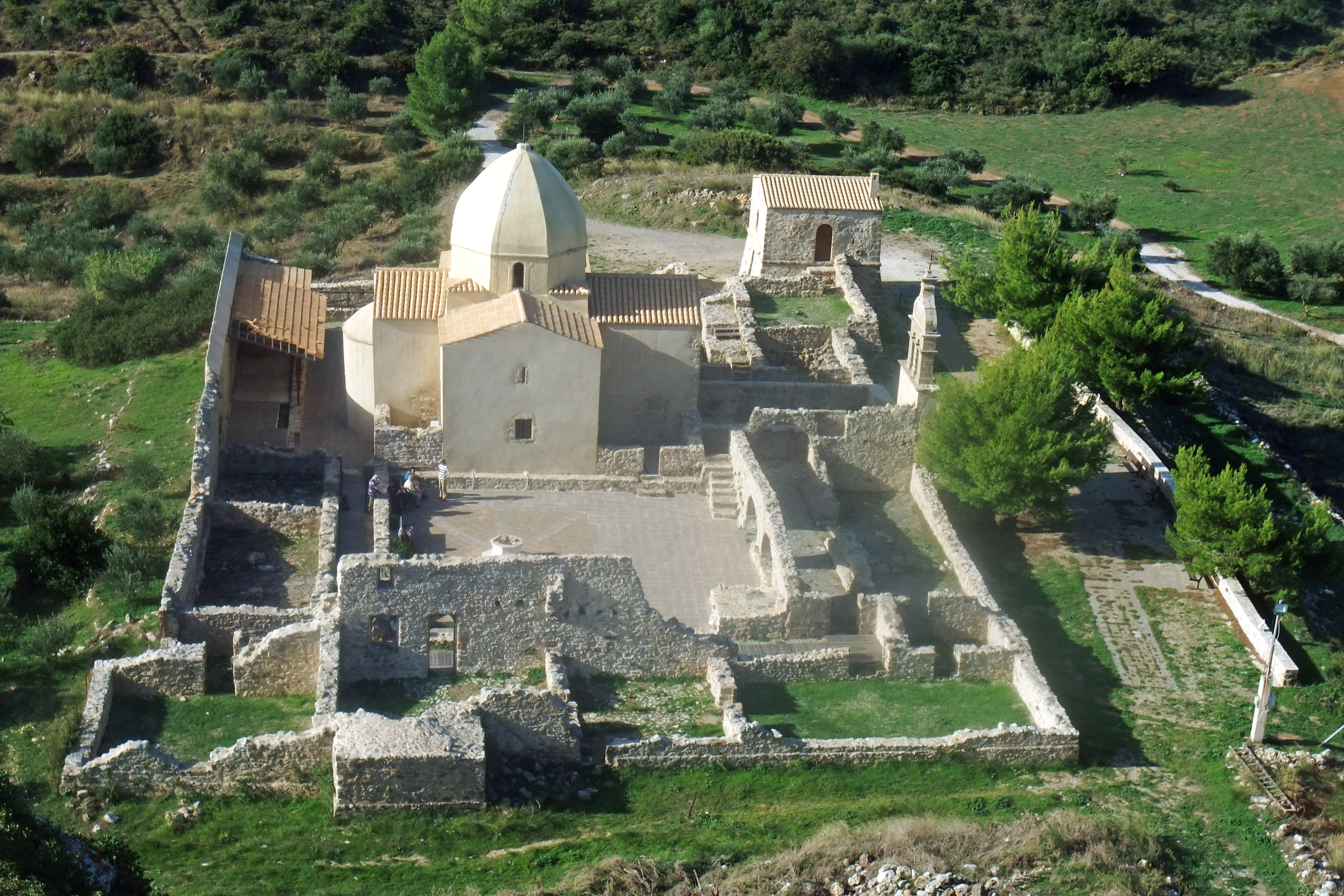
Church and monastery ruins of Panagía Skopiótissa on Mount Skopós

- 1889: 44,070 (island), 18,906 (city)
- 1896: 45,032 (island), 17,478 (city)
- 1900: 42,000
- 1907: 42,502
- 1920: 37.482
- 1940: 42,148
- 1981: 30,011
- 1991: 32,556 (island), 13,000 (city)
- 2001: 38,596
- 2011: 40,759
- 2021: 40,508

In 2006, there were 507 births and 407 deaths. Zakynthos is one of the regions with the highest population growth in Greece. It is also one of the only three prefectures (out of 54) in which the rural population has a positive growth rate. In fact, the rural population's growth rate is higher than that of the urban population in Zakynthos. Out of the 507 births, 141 were in urban areas and 366 were in rural areas. Out of the 407 deaths, 124 were in urban areas and 283 were in rural areas.

== Culture ==
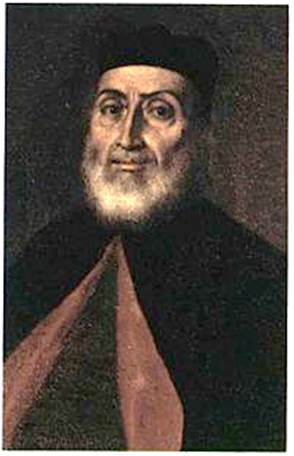
Nikolaos Koutouzis, self-portrait

=== Literature ===
Since Zakynthos was under the rule of the Venetian Republic, it had closer contact with Western literary trends than other areas inhabited by Greek people.

An early literary work from the island is the Rimada, a 16th-century romance in verse about Alexander the Great. Notable early writers include Tzanes Koroneos, author of Andragathemata of Bouas, a work of historical fiction; Nikolaos Loukanis, a 16th-century Renaissance humanist; Markos Defaranas (1503–1575), possibly the author of the Rimada; Pachomios Roussanos (1508–1553), a scholar and theologian; and Antonio Catiforo (1685–1763), a grammarian and satirist.

Towards the end of the 18th century, the so-called Heptanese School of Literature developed, consisting mainly of lyrical and satirical poetry in the vein of Romanticism prevalent throughout Europe at the time. It also contributed to the development of modern Greek theatre. An important poet of this school was Zakynthian Dionysios Solomos; another was Nikolaos Koutouzis, who also figures prominently in the Heptanese School of Painting. Others include Georgios Tertsetis (1800–1873), a politician, poet, and historian.

The 1998 novel Fugitive Pieces by Canadian Anne Michaels includes a section set on Zakynthos during the Nazi occupation. The young Jewish narrator, Jakob Beer, is hidden in a rural home. He notes that while he enjoyed the luxury of a room, 'thousands were stuffed into baking stoves, sewers, garbage bins. In the crawlspaces of double ceilings, in stables, pigsties, chicken coops'. The narrative refers to Mayor Karrer and Archbishop Chrysostomos's refusal to collaborate with the Germans.

== Transport ==
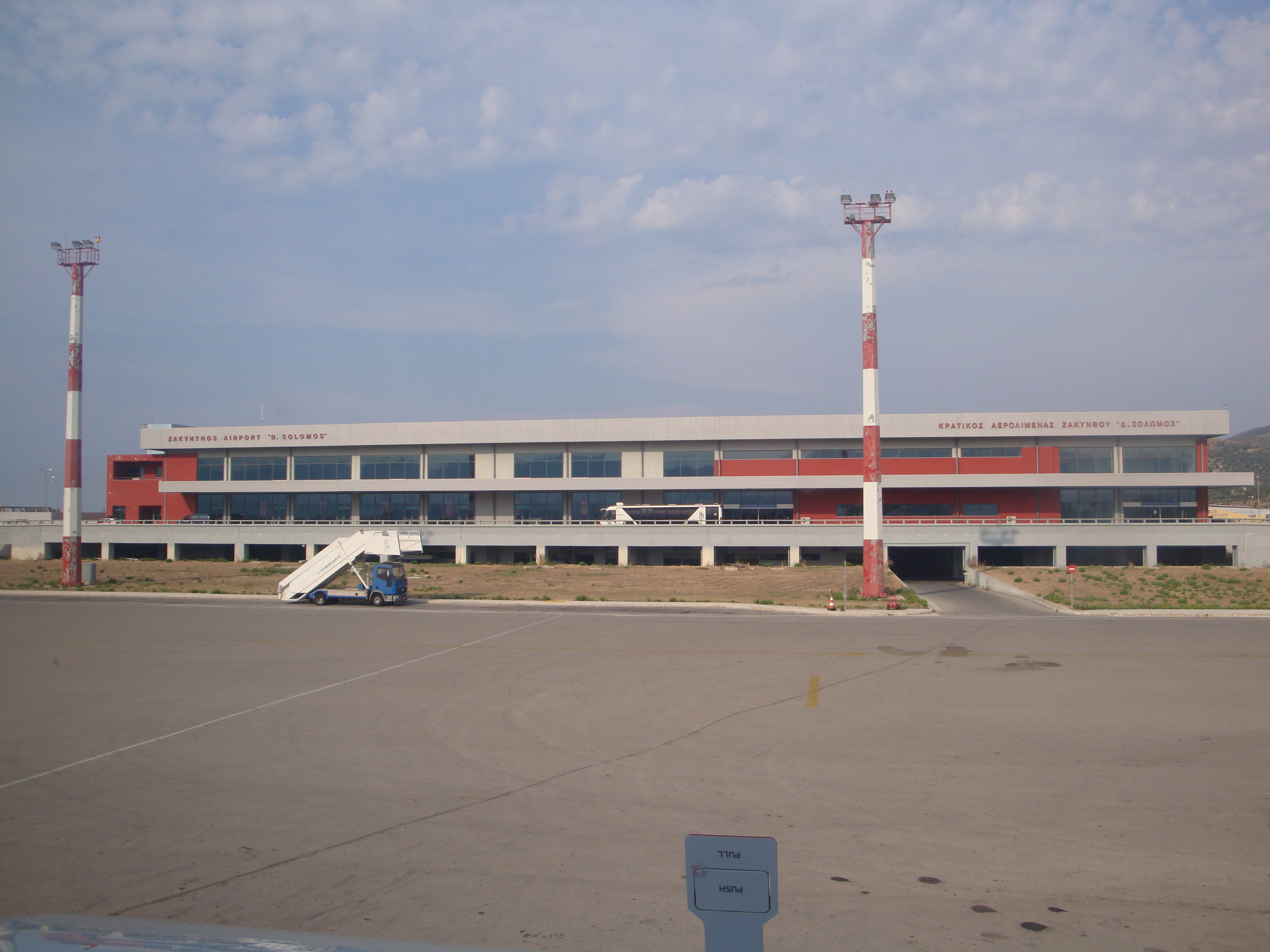
Zakynthos International Airport (ZTH)

The island is covered by a network of roads, which is particularly dense in the flat eastern part. The EO35 is the main road of the island, running between the capital and Keri in the south. The main provincial roads (of the total of 20 for the island) are: Zakynthos Provincial Road 1, from the capital to Vasilikos in the east; Provincial Road 6, from the capital to Volimes in the north; and Provincial Road 20, the main road in the western half of the island.

The island has one airport, Zakynthos International Airport, located off the EO35, offering connecting flights with other Greek and foreign airports. Opened in 1972, it is located 4.3 km (2.7 mi) from Zakynthos.

Zakynthos also features two ports, the main port located in the capital, and another in the village of Agios Nikolaos. From the main port, there is a connection to the port of Kyllini, which is the usual place of arrival on the island by sea from the mainland. From the port of Agios Nikolaos, there is a connection to the island of Kefalonia.

== Science ==
Ionian University's Department of Environment has been located on Zakynthos since 2003. It has developed laboratory and field station infrastructures in Zakynthos and the Strofades islets.

Freshwater resources on Zakynthos are limited, and as a result, a Greek-Norwegian educational collaboration is being established on the island. Science Park Zakynthos is a collaboration between the Technological Educational Institute of the Ionian Islands (TEI), the Norwegian University of Life Sciences (UMB), and the Therianos Villas and Therianos Family Farm on Zakynthos.

== Notable people ==
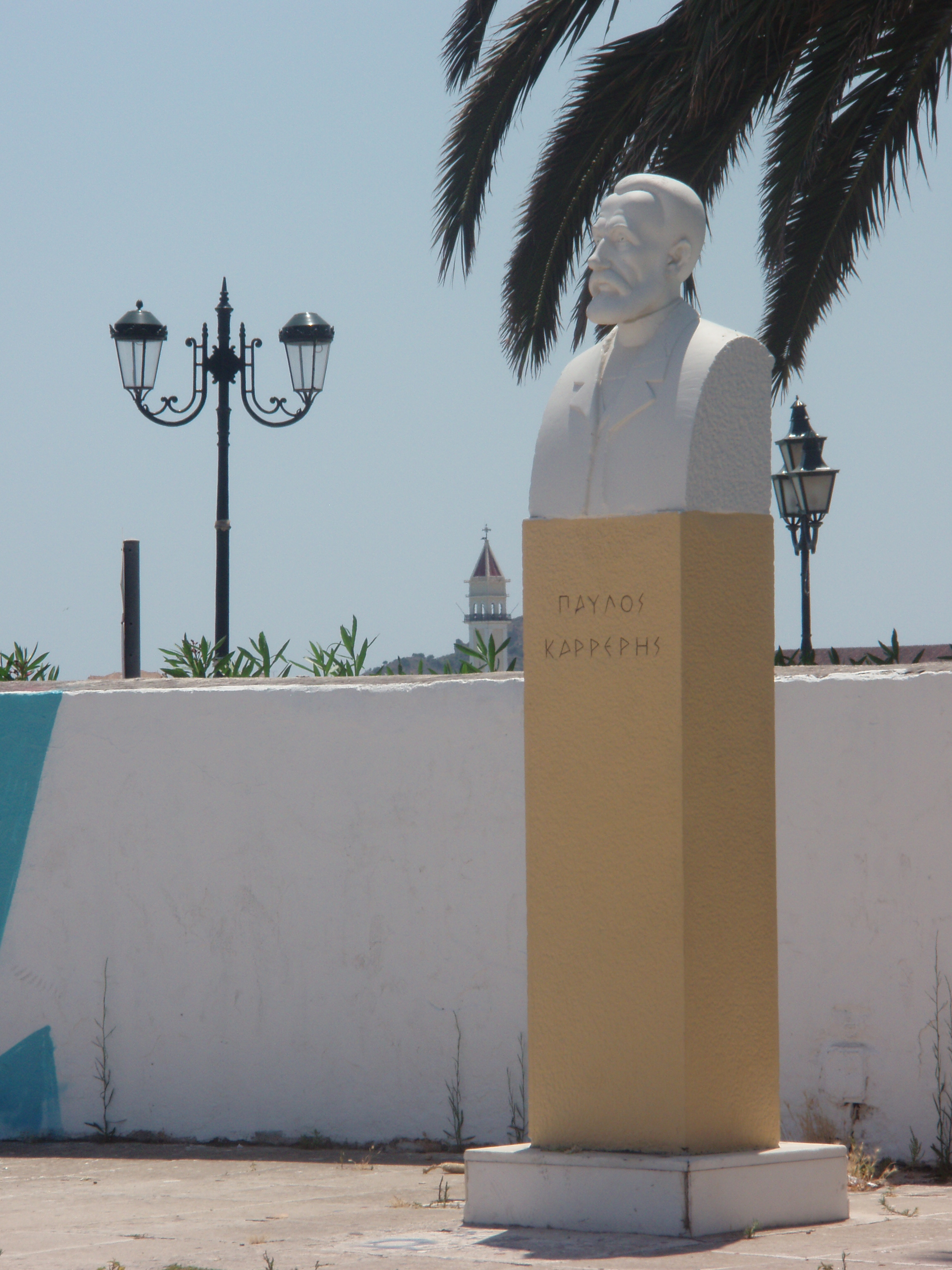
Bust of Pavlos Carrer

Among the most famous Zakynthians is the 19th-century poet Dionysios Solomos, whose statue adorns the main town square. The Italian poet Ugo Foscolo was born in Zakynthos: he wrote the sonnet "A Zacinto" dedicated to the island.

Antonios Komoutos, the second head of state "Prince" of the Septinsular Republic, originated from Zakynthos. His closest living descendant is styled Count Nicholas II of Zakynthos. His claim is disputed and is not recognised by the Greek Government.

Early 19th-century poet and playwright Elizabeth Moutzan-Martinegou, the first prominent modern Greek female writer, was born on the island. Andreas Vesalius, famous Renaissance surgeon and anatomist, died on Zakynthos after being shipwrecked while making a pilgrimage to the Holy Land. His body is thought to have been buried on the island, but the site has been lost.

== Tourism ==
The Museum of Solomos and Eminent Zakynthians, located on St Mark's plaza, includes local art from the 18th and 19th centuries, as well as sculptures, musical instruments contemporary to the eminent Zakynthians, and ceramics. In particular, it features Dionysios Solomos and Andreas Kalvos.

Since the mid-1980s, Zakynthos has become a hub for 18-to-30-year-old tourists, leading particularly to Laganas (formerly a quiet village) becoming a hotbed of clubbing, nightclubs, bars, and restaurants.

== International relations ==
Zakynthos is twinned with:

- Serravalle, San Marino (2014)

== See also ==
- "A Zacinto"
- List of settlements in Zakynthos
- Flag of Zakynthos

== General sources ==
- Fine, John Van Antwerp Jr. (1994) [1987]. The Late Medieval Balkans: A Critical Survey from the Late Twelfth Century to the Ottoman Conquest. Ann Arbor, Michigan: University of Michigan Press. ISBN 0472082604.
- Zečević, Nada (2014). The Tocco of the Greek Realm: Nobility, Power and Migration in Latin Greece (14th–15th centuries). Belgrade: Makart. ISBN 9788691944100.
