= Kallithea (disambiguation) =

Kallithea (Greek: Καλλιθέα) may refer to:

== Places in Greece ==
- municipalities:
  - Kallithea, a city in Attica, suburb of Athens
  - Kallithea, Rhodes, a municipality on Rhodes
  - Kallithea, Thessaloniki, a municipality in the Thessaloniki metropolitan area
- parts of other municipalities:
  - Kallithea, Achaea, a village in northcentral Achaea, part of Messatida
  - Kallithea, Aetolia-Acarnania, a village in eastern Aetolia-Acarnania, part of Paravola
  - Kallithea, Boeotia, a village in southeastern Boeotia, part of Tanagra
  - Kallithea, Chalkidiki, a village in southwestern Chalkidiki, part of Kassandra
  - Kallithea, Corinthia, a village in western Corinthia, part of Evrostini
  - Kallithea, Drama, a village in Drama, part of Prosotsani
  - Kallithea, Elis, a village in Elis, part of Alifeira
  - Kallithea, Euboea, a village in central Euboea, part of Amarynthos
  - Kallithea, Florina, a village in northwestern Florina, part of Prespes
  - Kallithea, Grevena, in Grevena, part of Gorgiani
  - Kallithea, Heraklion, a village on Crete (Heraklion regional unit), part of Nea Alikarnassos
  - Kallithea, Ioannina, a village in northern Ioannina, part of Konitsa
  - Kallithea, Laconia, a village in eastern Laconia, part of Geronthres
  - in Larissa regional unit:
    - Kallithea, Narthaki, in southern Larissa, part of Narthaki
    - Kallithea Elassonos, in northern Larissa, part of Olympos
  - Kallithea, Lemnos, a village on Lemnos
  - Kallithea, Messenia, a village in Messenia, part of Pylos
  - Kallithea, Phocis, a village in southern Phocis, part of Tolofona
  - Kallithea, Phthiotis, a village in Phthiotis, part of Spercheiada
  - Kallithea, Pieria, a village in eastern Pieria, part of Paralia
  - Kallithea, Samos, a village on Samos, part of Marathokampos
  - in Thesprotia:
    - Kallithea, Paramythia, a village in eastern Thesprotia, part of Paramythia
    - Kallithea, Filiates, a village in northern Thesprotia, part of Filiates
  - Kallithea, Trikala, in Trikala, part of Tymfaia
  - in Xanthi regional unit:
    - Kallithea, Xanthi, part of Xanthi
    - Kallithea, Stavroupoli, part of Stavroupoli
  - Kallithea, Zakynthos, a village in Zakynthos, part of Alykes

== Science and technology ==
- Kallithea (software), source code management system.
- Niki Kallithea, a Bulgarian autogyro design
