= Kallithea, Zakynthos =

Kallithea Καλλιθέα
- Community
- Location within Greece
- Coordinates: 37°48′40″N 20°46′23″E
- Country: Greece
- Administrative region: Ionian Islands
- Regional unit: Zakynthos
- Municipality: Zakynthos
- Municipal unit: Alykes

Population (2021)
  - Community: 251
- Time zone: UTC+2 (EET)
  - Summer (DST): UTC+3 (EEST)

Kallithea (Greek: Καλλιθέα), is a village and a community in the municipal unit of Alykes in the island of Zakynthos, Greece. It is situated at the eastern foot of the Vrachionas mountains, at about 60 m (200 ft) elevation. It is 3 km (2 mi) southeast of Katastari, 3 km (2 mi) southwest of Ano Gerakari, 3 km (2 mi) northwest of Agios Dimitrios and 12 km (7 mi) northwest of Zakynthos city. The farm of the Science Park Zakynthos, a Norwegian-Greek institute that focuses on sustainable water use, is situated in Kallithea. The village suffered great damage from the 1953 Ionian earthquake.

== Population ==
Historical population
Year	Pop.	±%
1991	216	—
2001	224	+3.7%
2011	238	+6.2%
2021	251	+5.5%

== See also ==
- List of settlements in Zakynthos
