= Gious Kampos =

Plateau in Crete, Greece

Coordinates: 35°12′42″N 24°34′35″E

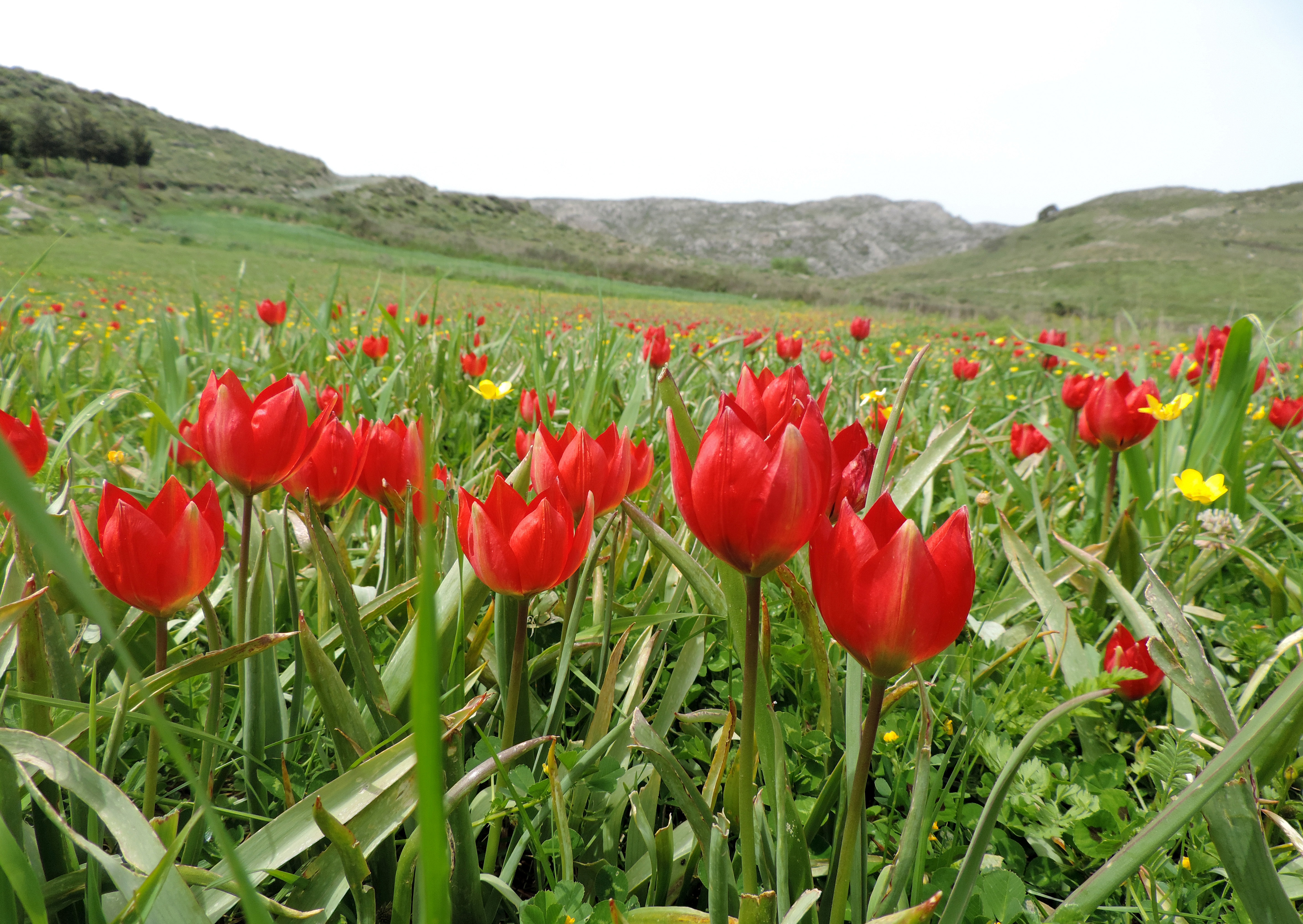
View of the plateau

Gious Kampos (Greek: Γιούς Κάμπος), is a plateau in the Amari Valley on the island of Crete in Greece. Its name comes from the phrase "τση Γιούς ο Κάμπος", which means the plain of Eos (Ηώς in Greek) in the Cretan dialect. Located northwest of Mt. Kedros, the plateau extends to an area of approx. 2.5 km^{2} and lies at an average altitude of 750 m, having good road access from the villages of Spili, Kissos and Gerakari. The plateau is well known for its remarkably rich flora which includes several native and endemic plants. In particular, the red Tulipa doerfleri (de), one of the few native species of tulips in Crete, thrives there. The plateau also grows high-quality cereals and arid vegetables.
