= Gerakari =

Gerakari may refer to several places in Greece:

- Gerakari, Ioannina, a village in Ioannina (regional unit)
- Gerakari, Kilkis, a village in Kilkis (regional unit)
- Gerakari, Larissa, a village
- Gerakari, Rethymno, a village
- Gerakari, Trikala, a village in Trikala (regional unit)
- Ano Gerakari, a village on the island Zakynthos
- Kato Gerakari, a village on the island Zakynthos
- Meso Gerakari, a village on the island Zakynthos
