= Alikanas =

Alikanas Αλικανάς
- Community
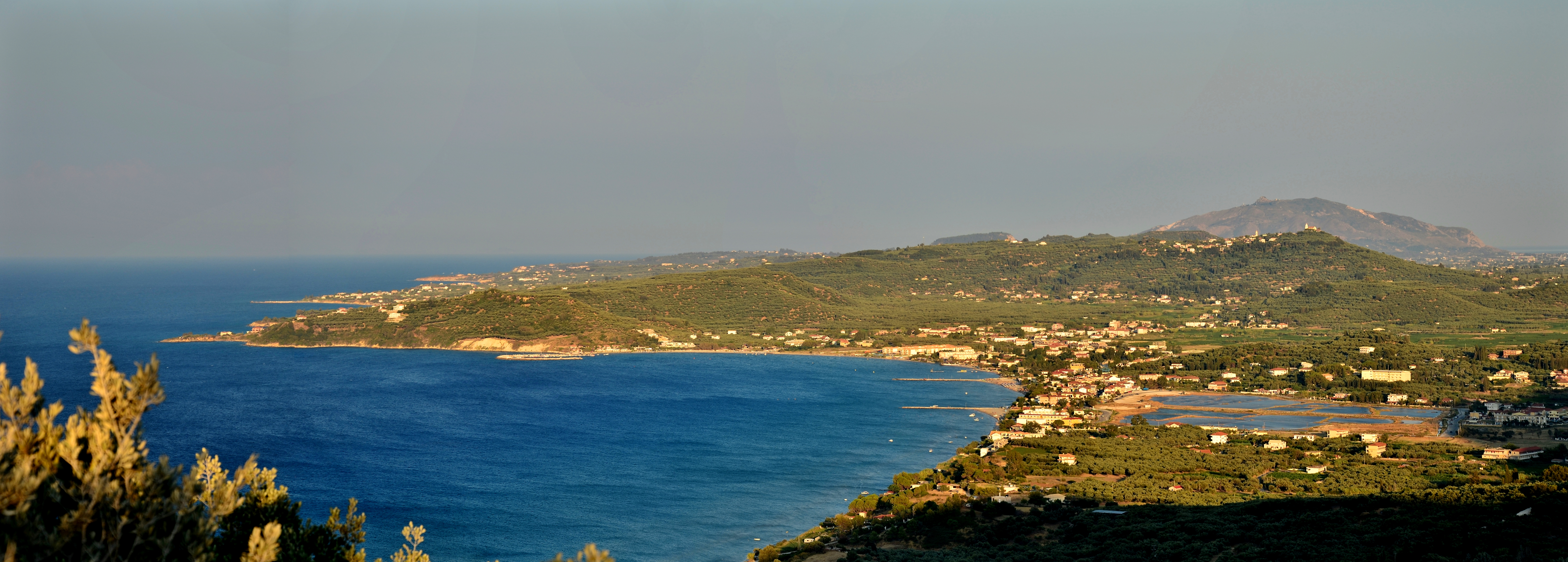

- Location within Greece
- Coordinates: 37°50′N 20°46′E
- Country: Greece
- Administrative region: Ionian Islands
- Regional unit: Zakynthos
- Municipality: Zakynthos
- Municipal unit: Alykes

Population (2021)
  - Community: 434
- Time zone: UTC+2 (EET)
  - Summer (DST): UTC+3 (EEST)
- Vehicle registration: ZA

Alikanas (Greek: Αλικανάς) is a village in the municipal unit of Alykes situated on the northeastern coast about 15 km northwest of Zakynthos (city) on the island of Zakynthos, Greece. Located 1 km (0.6 mi) from the neighbouring village of Alykes, on the Ionian coast, Alikanas is a popular tourist destination with a beautiful sandy wide beach.

The beach at Alykanas is a habitat for the lily of the sea, protected by Greek and international legislation. The famous caretta caretta is seen sometimes in these waters, even though they prefer less populated areas.

It is 3 km (1.9 mi) northeast of Katastari, 3 km (1.9 mi) northwest of Ano Gerakari and 12 km (7.5 mi) northwest of Zakynthos city.

== Bacterial structures ==
In 2016, scientists from the University of Athens and University of East Anglia published their findings that the underwater "ruins" discovered off Alikanas Bay were actually created by microbes several million years ago.

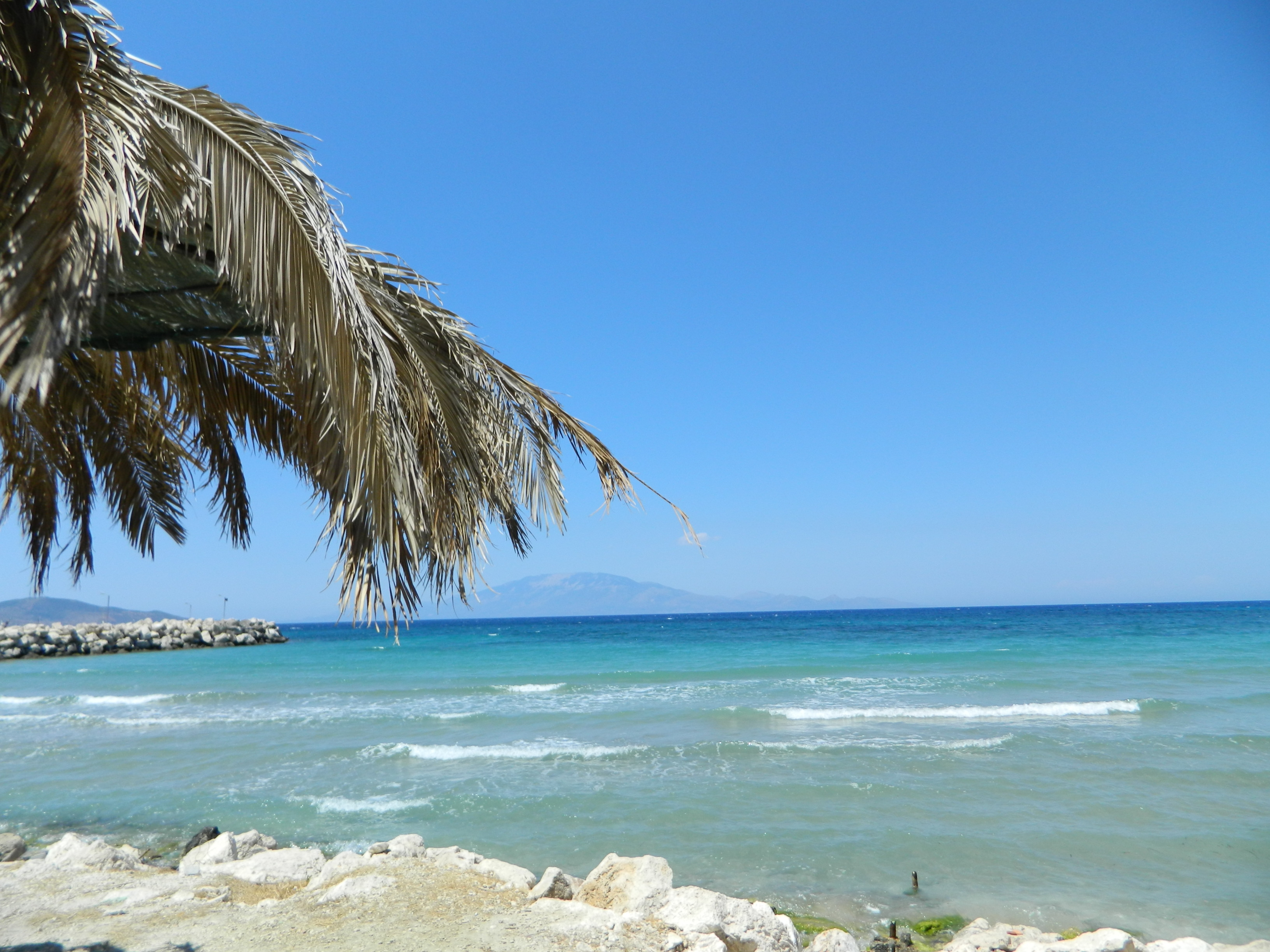

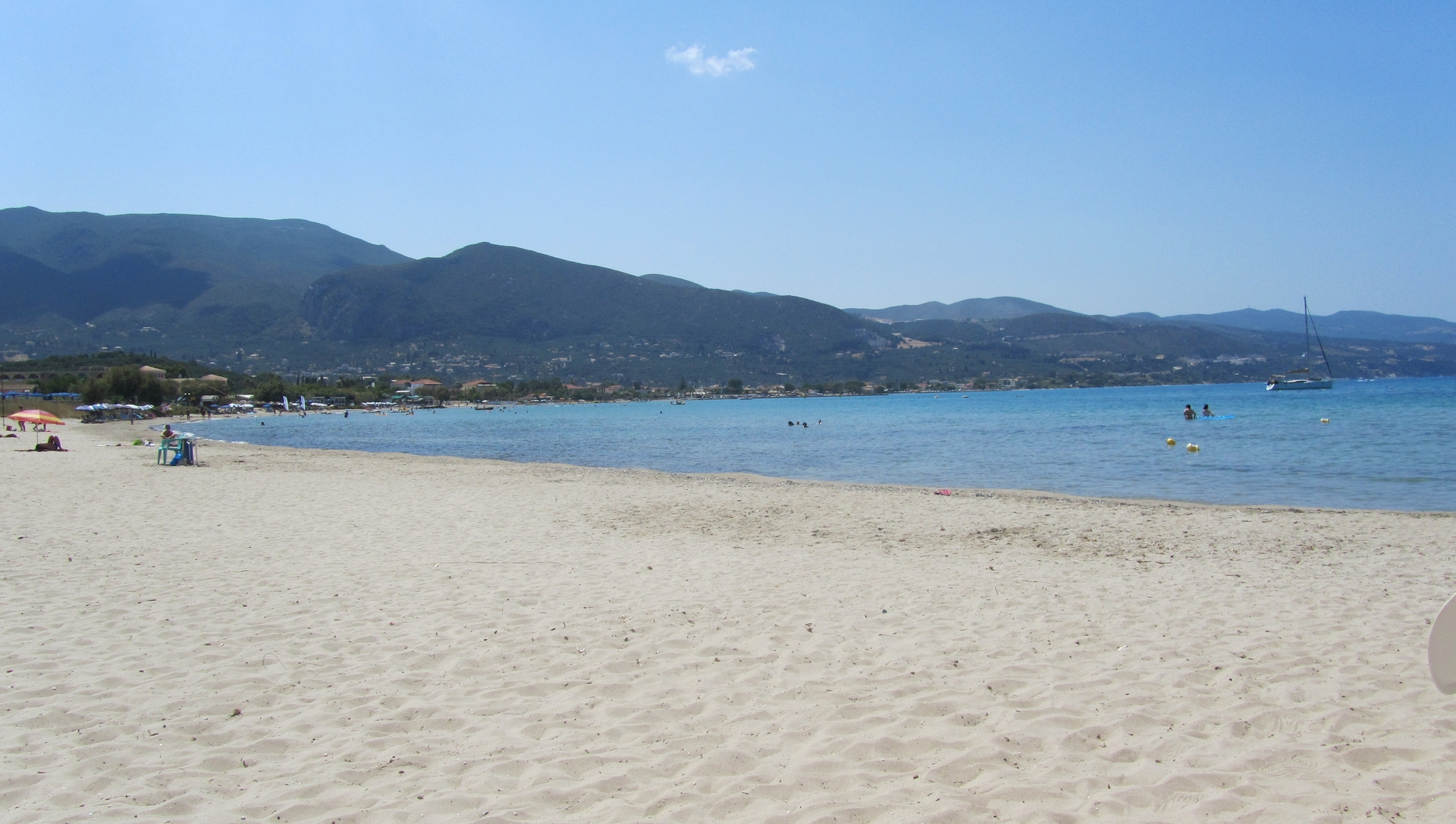

== Population ==
Year	Population
1981	199
1991	223
2001	341
2011	441
2021	434

== See also ==
- List of settlements in Zakynthos
