= Melabes =

Melambes Μέλαμπες
- Community
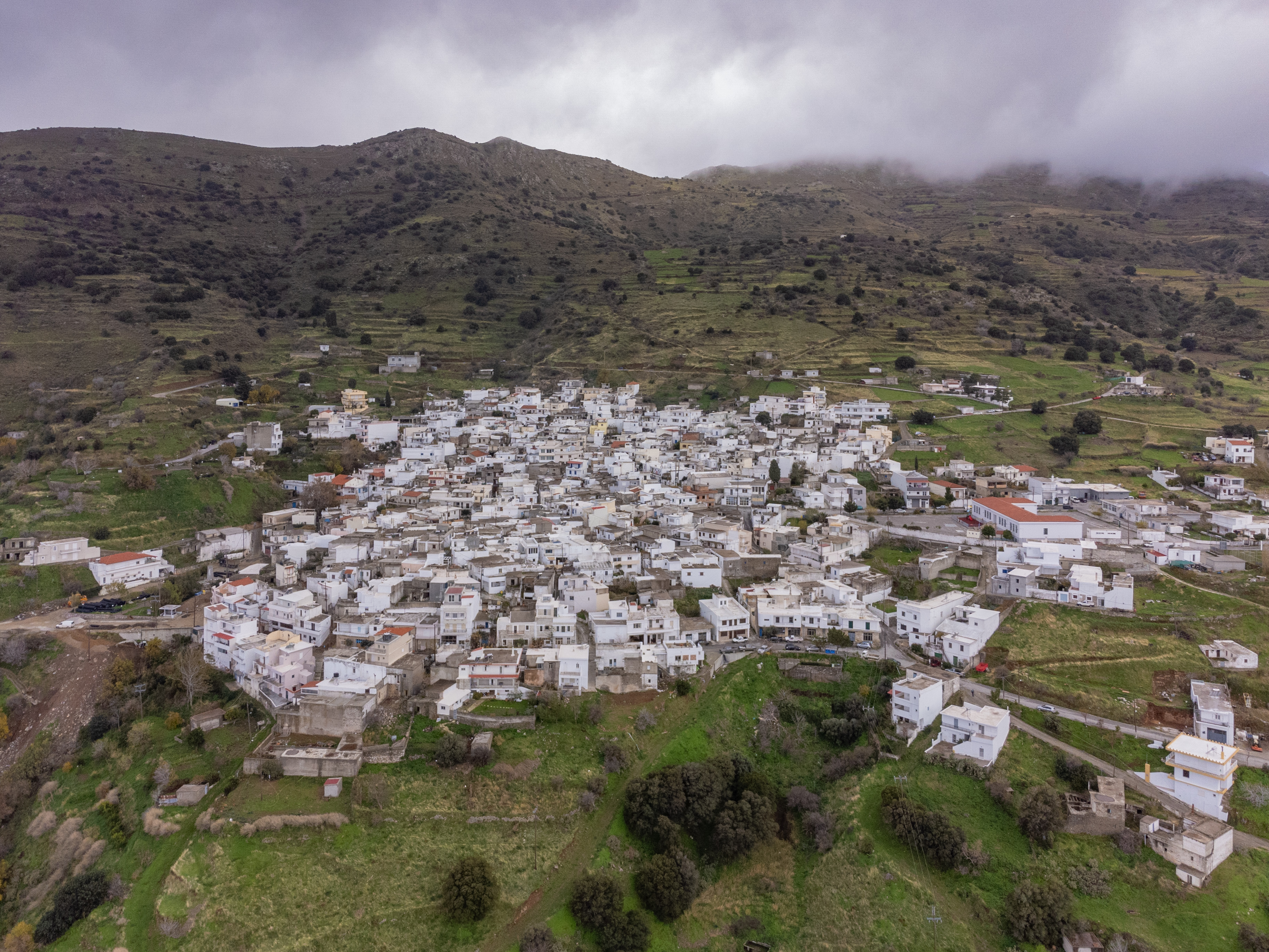
- View of Melampes

- Location within Greece
- Coordinates: 35°7′38″N 24°39′11″E
- Country: Greece
- Administrative region: Crete
- Regional unit: Rethymno
- Municipality: Agios Vasileios
- Municipal unit: Lampi

Population (2021)
  - Community: 467
- Time zone: UTC+2 (EET)
  - Summer (DST): UTC+3 (EEST)
- Website: http://www.melabes.gr/

Melabes or Melambes (Greek: Μέλαμπες) is a village in Rethymno regional unit, Crete, Greece.

== Name ==
The meaning of the name Melambes is not yet confirmed. It has its origin in ancient Greek and is probably related to Ancient Lappa (region in Greece). According to tradition, the name represents the brightness of the sunrise in the region.

== Geography ==
The village is located 42 km south of Rethymno City and 10 km from the village Agia Galini, at the valley between Mount Kedros (1777 m) and Mount Vouvala (947 m), at an altitude of 570 m above sea-level. The village has a panoramic view, of Mount Ida (Greek: Ψηλορείτης) to the North and the Gulf of Messara to the South. The climate is mild and with low humidity.

== History ==
=== Venetian Occupation ===
The first written appearance of the village Melambes is attributed to Francesco Barocci (1537-1604) at 1577 and at the Venetian Census of 1583 it was reported to have a population of 338 people.

=== Ottoman Occupation ===
During the Ottoman occupation inhabitants of the village took part in a number local of battles, such as the battle of Kako Ryaki (Greek: Κακό Ρυάκι - Bad Stream) in 1822. Emmanuel, Aggelis, George and Nikolaos Vlatakis, born and lived in Melambes, also participated in the battle and openly declared their faith to the Christian God. Turks arrested them for declaring their faith and after four months of imprisonment and torture to renounce the Christian God, they were executed at the Big Gate of Rethymno City at October 28, 1824. They were later declared Saint Martyrs by the Orthodox Church and the biggest Church of the village is built in their name.

Other inhabitants of Melambes participated at the Cretan Revolt (1866–1869) in battles in the local region, Rethymno, Sfakia, Amari and Messara. During 1881 the village was the seat of the municipality of Melambes and had 1002 inhabitants.

=== Cretan State ===
At the establishment of the Cretan state in 1898 two of the Parliament Members were Stratis and Stylianos Fotakis of the village of Melambes. In 1912, volunteers from the village and the surrounding area participated at the battle of Epirus, during the First Balkan War.

=== Modern Era ===
During the World War II more than 100 villagers from Melambes took part in the Cretan Resistance against the German Occupation.

== Culture ==
=== Churches & Temples ===
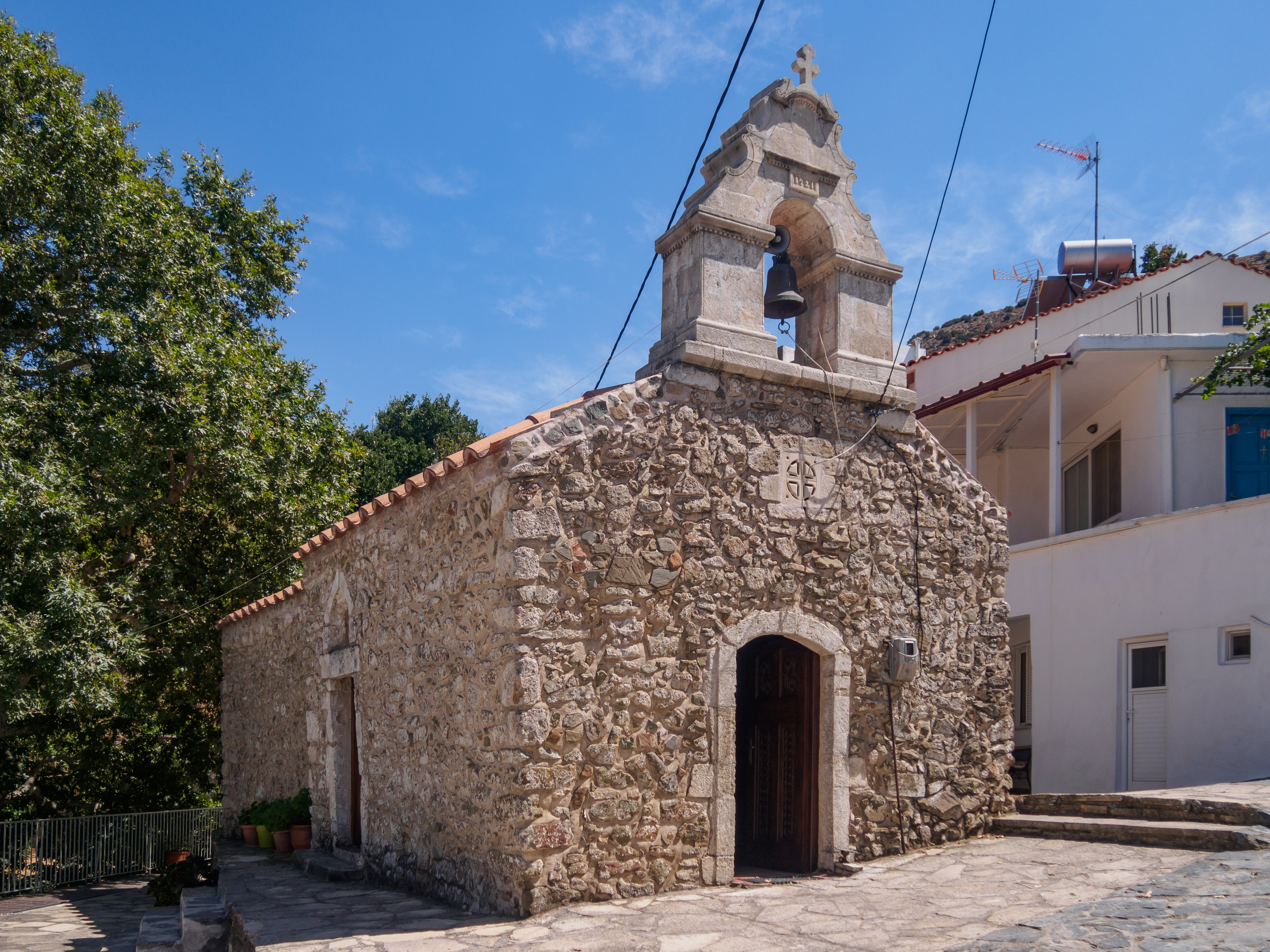
The church of Saint Paraskevi

The village of Melambes has the following churches/temples:

- Saint Paraskevi (Greek: Αγία Παρασκευή) was built in the 14th century
- Holy Mary (Greek: Παναγία) was built in 1835 and it is currently the main church of the village
- The Saints Four Martyrs is the Cathedral Church of the village and was built in 1952.
- Saint George monastery was built in the 14th century
- Saint John monastery was built in the 15th century
- Saint Dimitris monastery was built in the 15th century and only part of the main building still exists

=== Sports ===
In 1962 the Melambes Sports Club was founded. The village has its own soccer field since 2000 and it is used by the members of the Melambes Sports Club for training purposes and athletic events.

=== Education ===
The village has its own kindergarten, elementary and middle School. It was initially built in 1930 to accommodate more than 100 students and is still functional. High school students need to travel to the near-by village of Spili or Rethymno city to attend classes.

== Sources ==
- Great Greek Encyclopedia (Greek: Μεγάλη Ελληνική Εγκυκλοπαίδεια), Volume 16, p. 852.
- Maps «ROAD»
- Greek Statistical Authority (EES)
