= 2004 Summer Olympics torch relay =

- Host city: Athens, Greece
- Countries visited: Greece, Australia, Japan, South Korea, China, India, Egypt, South Africa, Brazil, Mexico, United States, Canada, Belgium, Netherlands, Switzerland, France, United Kingdom, Spain, Italy, Germany, Sweden, Finland, Russia, Ukraine, Turkey, Bulgaria, Cyprus and Albania
- Start date: 25 March 2004
- End date: 13 August 2004

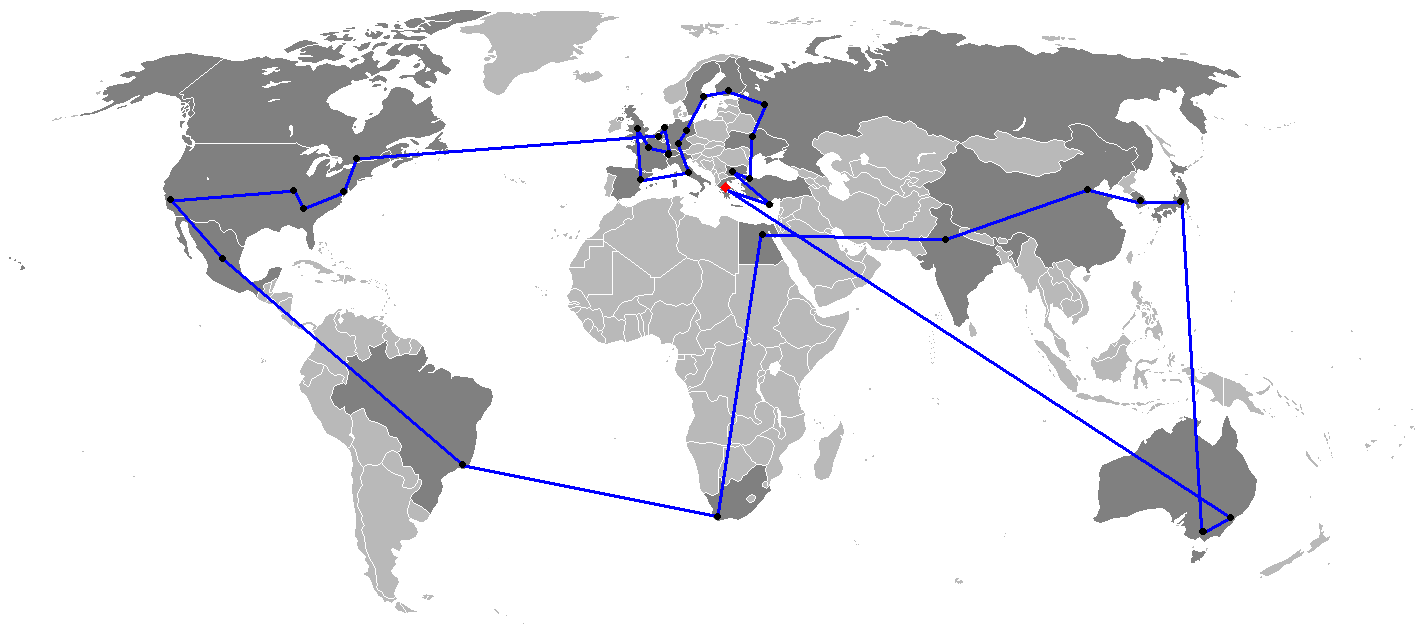
For the first time, the Olympic Flame circumnavigated the globe, starting in Olympia in advance of the 2004 games.

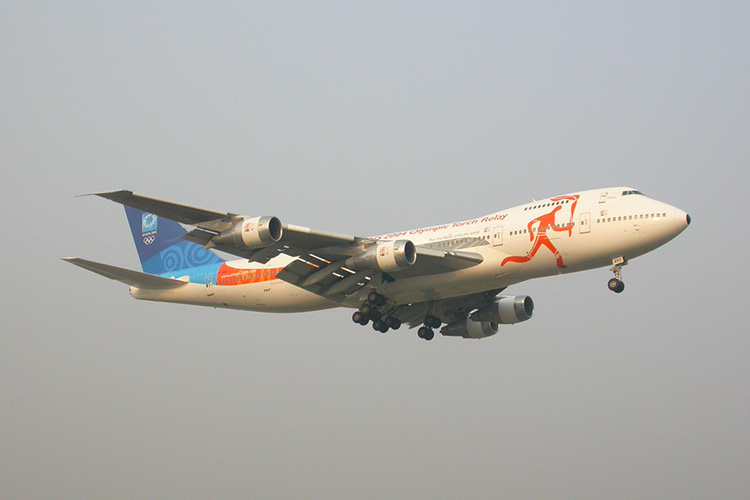
Olympic Torch Relay Jet – Zeus (Registration TF-ARO)

The 2004 Summer Olympics Torch Relay, prior to the 2004 Summer Olympics, took the Olympic Flame across every habitable continent, returning to Athens, Greece. Every city which had hosted, will host, or coincidentally elected to host the Summer Olympics until the 2028 Summer Olympics was visited or revisited by the torch, as well as several other cities chosen for their international importance. The main reason the torch relay went around the world was to highlight the fact that the Ancient Olympic Games started in Greece, and in modern times have been held around the world but finally took place again in Greece in 2004.

The relay was the first time the Olympic flame had travelled to Africa and South America. The flame was transported from country to country aboard a specially equipped Boeing 747 leased from Atlanta Icelandic (Registration TF-ARO) called Zeus. On board the flame was carried and burned continuously in specially modified miners' lamps.

== Route in Greece (first phase) ==
Date	Map
25 March: Olympia, Elis, Pyrgos, Andritsaina; 26 March: Megalopolis, Dorio, Kopanaki, Kyparissia, Filiatra, Gargalianoi, Pylos; 27 March: Methoni, Koroni, Petalidi, Messini, Valira, Meligalas, Kalamata; 28 March: Mystras, Gytheio; 29 March: Sparta, Tegea, Tripoli; 30 March: Nemea, Mycenae, Argos, Nafplio, Epidaurus; 31 March: Kranidi, Spetses, Hydra, Poros, Aegina, Salamina, Panathenaic Stadium	2004 Summer Olympics torch relay is located in Greece

== International route ==
The International Leg of the 2004 Olympic Torch Relay officially began on 4 June 2004, when the flame touched down in Sydney, Australia, previous host city of the 2000 Summer Olympics. In Sydney, it visited Stadium Australia, the 2000 Summer Olympics main venue, prior to the National Rugby League match between the Canterbury-Bankstown Bulldogs and Sydney Roosters; in Melbourne, it visited the Melbourne Cricket Ground, the 1956 Summer Olympics main venue, at half-time of the Australian Football League match between Hawthorn and Essendon.

=== Route in Oceania ===
Date	Map
4 June: Sydney, Australia (host city of the 2000 Summer Olympics); 5 June: Melbourne (host city of the 1956 Summer Olympics)	2004 Summer Olympics torch relay is located in Oceania

=== Route in Asia ===
Date	Map
6 June: Tokyo, Japan (host city of the 1964 Summer Olympics); 7 June: Seoul, South Korea (host city of the 1988 Summer Olympics); 8 June: Beijing, China (host city of the 2008 Summer Olympics); 10 June: Delhi, India	2004 Summer Olympics torch relay is located in Asia

=== Route in Africa ===
Date	Map
11 June: Cairo, Egypt; 12 June: Cape Town, South Africa	2004 Summer Olympics torch relay is located in Africa

=== Route in the Americas ===
Date	Map
13 June: Rio de Janeiro, Brazil (host of the 2016 Summer Olympics); 15 June: Mexico City, Mexico (host city of the 1968 Summer Olympics); 16 June: Los Angeles, United States (host city of the 1932, and 1984 Summer Olympics); 17 June: St. Louis (host city of the 1904 Summer Olympics); 18 June: Atlanta (host city of the 1996 Summer Olympics); 19 June: New York (headquarters of United Nations); 20 June: Montreal, Canada (host city of the 1976 Summer Olympics)	2004 Summer Olympics torch relay is located in America

=== Route in Europe (excluding Greece) ===
Date	Map
21 June: Antwerp, Belgium (host city of the 1920 Summer Olympics); 22 June: Brussels; 23 June: Amsterdam, Netherlands (host city of the 1928 Summer Olympics); 24 June: Geneva, Switzerland (headquarters of League of Nations and many United Nations agencies); Lausanne (headquarters of the International Olympic Committee); 25 June: Paris, France (host city of the 1900 and 1924 Summer Olympics); 26 June: London, United Kingdom (host city of the 1908 and 1948 Summer Olympics); 27 June: Madrid, Spain; Barcelona (host city of the 1992 Summer Olympics); 28 June: Rome, Italy (host city of the 1960 Summer Olympics); 29 June: Munich, Germany (host city of the 1972 Summer Olympics); 30 June: Berlin (host city of the 1936 Summer Olympics); 1 July: Stockholm, Sweden (host city of the 1912 Summer Olympics and the equestrian events of the 1956 Summer Olympics); 2 July: Helsinki, Finland (host city of the 1952 Summer Olympics); 3 July: Moscow, Russia (host city of the 1980 Summer Olympics); 5 July: Kyiv, Ukraine; 6 July: Istanbul, Turkey; 7 July: Sofia, Bulgaria; 8 July: Nicosia, Cyprus	2004 Summer Olympics torch relay is located in Europe

The International Leg of the 2004 Olympic Torch Relay concluded on July 8, 2004, just over a month after it began its global journey and just over a month before the 2004 Summer Olympics opening ceremony on 13 August 2004.

== Route in Greece (second phase) ==
After visiting Cyprus, the Greek Leg of the Torch Relay resumed on 9 July 2004, with the flame touching down in Crete in the city of Heraklion. During the Greek Leg of the relay, the torch also made a cursory stopover in Albania when the torch was carried through a lake on the Greek-Albanian border.

Date	Map
9 July (day 1): Heraklion; 10 July (day 2): Knossos, Malia, Agios Nikolaos, Sitia; 11 July (day 3): Ierapetra, Pyrgos, Agia Galini; 12 July (day 4): Spili, Rethymno, Chania; 13 July (day 5): Karpathos, Kalymnos, Kos, Kastellorizo, Rhodes; 14 July (day 6): Santorini, Sifnos, Paros, Naxos, Mykonos, Syros; 15 July (day 7): Tinos, Andros, Samos, Chios, Oinousses, Mytilene; 16 July (day 8): Lemnos, Thasos, Samothrace; 17 July (day 9): Orestiada, Didymoteicho, Soufli, Feres, Alexandroupoli; 18 July (day 10): Sapes, Komotini, Lake Vistonida, Abdera, Xanthi; 19 July (day 11): Chrysoupoli, Kavala, Philippi; 20 July (day 12): Drama, Alistrati, Nea Zichni, Serres; 21 July (day 13): Sidirokastro, Vyroneia, Doirani, Kato Poroia, Kilkis; 22 July (day 14): Langadas, Polygyros; 23 July (day 15): Moudania, Triglia, Epanomi, Michaniona, Thermi, Thessaloniki; 24 July (day 16): Pella, Giannitsa, Alexandreia, Litochoro, Dion; 25 July (day 17): Katerini, Kolindros, Aiginio, Meliki, Vergina; 26 July (day 18): Veria, Naousa, Skydra, Edessa, Florina; 27 July (day 19): Psarades, Amyntaio, Ptolemaida, Kozani; 28 July (day 20): Grevena, Siatista, Kastoria; 29 July (day 21): Eptachori, Konitsa, Kalpaki, Dodoni, Ioannina; 30 July (day 22): Mikro Peristeri, Metsovo, Kalabaka; 31 July (day 23): Trikala, Karditsa, Larissa, Nea Ionia, Volos; 1 August (day 24): Stylida, Lamia, Karpenisi, Skopelos, Skiathos; 2 August (day 25): Kymi, Aliveri, Amarynthos, Chalcis; 3 August (day 26): Aliartos, Livadia, Arachova, Delphi; 4 August (day 27): Amfissa, Itea, Galaxidi, Nafpaktos, Zakynthos; 5 August (day 28): Argostoli, Ithaca, Astakos, Lefkada, Corfu; 6 August (day 29): Igoumenitsa, Syvota, Parga, Preveza; 7 August (day 30): Arta, Menidi, Amfilochia, Agrinio; 8 August (day 31): Missolonghi, Rio–Antirrio bridge, Patras; 9 August (day 32): Aigio, Akrata, Xylokastro, Kiato, Corinth; 10 August (day 33: Thebes, Marathon; 11 August (day 34): Piraeus; 12–13 August (days 35 & 36): Athens	2004 Summer Olympics torch relay is located in Greece

== Aftermath ==
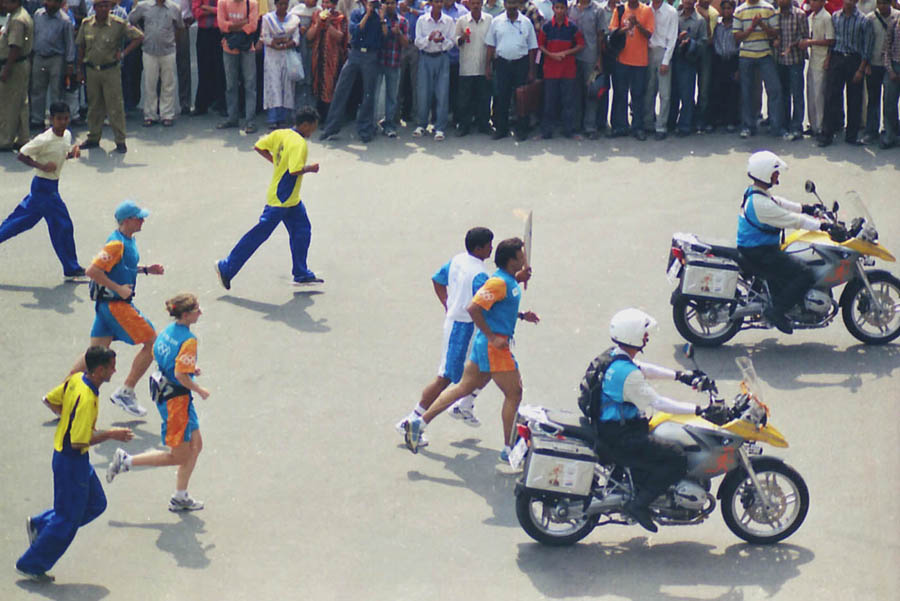
A scene of Olympic Torch Relay 2004 in New Delhi, India on 10 June 2004

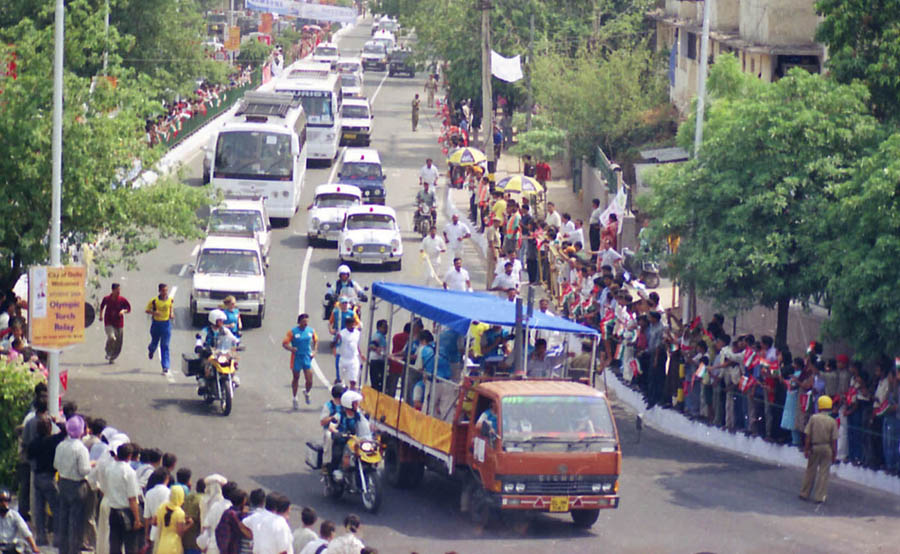
A scene of Olympic Torch Relay 2004 in New Delhi, India on 10 June 2004

The International Olympic Committee has indicated that, due to the success of the 2004 run, they might sanction a global circumnavigation of the flame before every succeeding Olympics. However, those plans were abandoned in March 2009 due to the protests in the international leg of the torch relay of the 2008 Summer Olympics (with an exception made for the 2010 Youth Olympic Games).

== See also ==
- 2008 Summer Olympics torch relay
