= Agios Dimitrios, Zakynthos =

Agios Dimitrios Άγιος Δημήτριος
- Community
- Location within Greece
- Coordinates: 37°48′N 20°48′E
- Country: Greece
- Administrative region: Ionian Islands
- Regional unit: Zakynthos
- Municipality: Zakynthos
- Municipal unit: Alykes

Population (2021)
  - Community: 610
- Time zone: UTC+2 (EET)
  - Summer (DST): UTC+3 (EEST)
- Vehicle registration: ZA

Agios Dimitrios (Greek: Άγιος Δημήτριος) is a village and a community in the municipal unit Alykes, in the central part of the island Zakynthos, Greece. The community includes the village Drakas. Agios Dimitrios is 2 km south of Meso Gerakari, 5 km west of Vanato, 5 km southeast of Katastari and 9 km west of Zakynthos city. The village suffered great damage from the 1953 Ionian earthquake.

== Population ==
Year	Village population	Community population
1981	435	-
1991	367	-
2001	433	521
2011	531	615
2021	517	610

== See also ==
- List of settlements in Zakynthos
