= Veloni, Grevena =

Veloni
- Settlement
- Location within Greece
- Coordinates: 39°53′14″N 21°19′35″E
- Country: Greece
- Geographic region: Macedonia
- Administrative region: Western Macedonia
- Regional unit: Grevena
- Municipality: Grevena
- Municipal unit: Gorgiani
- Community: Kallithea
- Time zone: UTC+2 (EET)
  - Summer (DST): UTC+3 (EEST)
- Vehicle registration: ΚΖ

Veloni (Greek: Βελώνη, before 1919: Βελιάνη – Veliani; Aromanian: Valone) was a village in Grevena Regional Unit, Macedonia, Greece. Under Greece, for most of its existence, Veloni was part of the community of Kallithea.

Veloni was inhabited by Aromanians (Vlachs), and by the 1960s it was deserted. The village was abolished on 5 April 1981 and annexed to the village of Kranea.

== See also ==
- List of settlements in the Grevena regional unit
