= Geraki =

Geraki (Greek: Γεράκι) may refer to the following places in Greece:

- Geraki, Elis, a village in Elis
- Geraki, Heraklion, a village in the municipal unit Kastelli, Crete
- Geraki, Laconia, a village in the municipal unit Geronthres, Laconia
  - Barony of Geraki, a medieval lordship named after the village

== See also ==
- Gerakas
- Gerakari (disambiguation)
- Gerakini
