= Science Park Zakynthos =

Science Park Zakynthos is a Norwegian-Greek educational, research and business collaboration being established on the Greek island of Zakynthos. The aim is to work upon sustainable environment issues, such as water resources. The project is a collaboration between The Norwegian University of Life Sciences (UMB), the Technological Educational Institute of Ionian Islands (TEI) and the Therianos Villas and Therianos Family Farm on Zakynthos.

== Overview ==
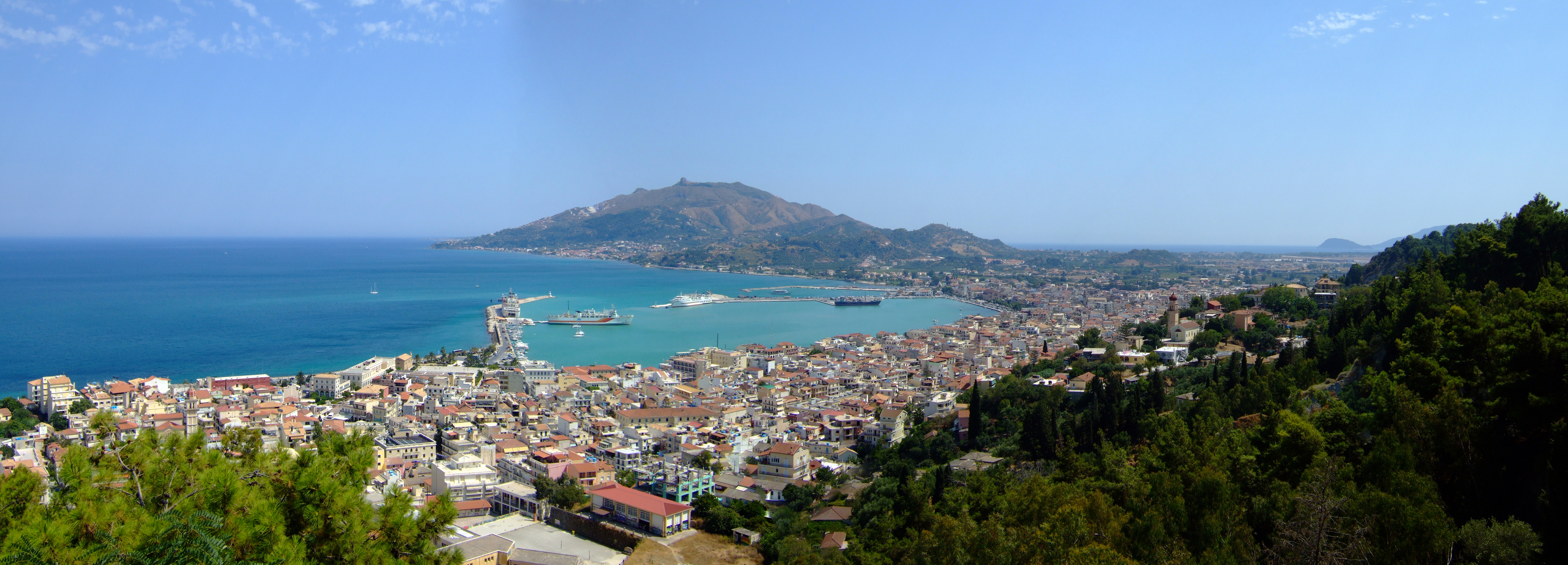
Panorama of Zakynthos city.

The Science Park Zakynthos is planned to be established at the Therianos Family Farm. It will work as a test field location and area for student training, research, information and business development.

The collaboration will involves student and professor exchange between the institutions, as a part of a theoretical and laboratory coursework training both in Norway and Zakynthos. During the spring semester Greek students from the Department of Environmental Technology and Ecology are invited to participate in courses at the Norwegian University of Life Sciences, The department of Mathematical Sciences and Technology.

In the spring both the Norwegian and the Greek students will participate in an intensive course at Zakynthos (water, technology and environment), with both theoretical and practical training. The staff from Norway and Zakynthos will participate in the teaching in Norway and at Zakynthos and intend to develop joint research activities.

A test field location and area for student training in Zakynthos is an important part of the collaboration between the MoU-partners (TEI and UMB). The Therianos Villas and Therianos Family Farm (Kallithea, Zakynthos, Alykes) have committed to be the practical facilitator for the testfield and to be an area for student training, research, science, information and business development.

The collaboration between TEI and UMB and the Therianos Family Farm will be organized in a concept called the “Science Park Zakynthos”. The “Science Park Zakynthos” is a model of collaboration between universities, authorities and industry. The “Science Park Zakynthos” intend to be officially opened in the spring 2011, when the coursework training take place at Zakynthos.

The subject-areas in the collaboration between the Norwegian University of Life Sciences (UMB), Technological Educational Institute (TEI) of Ionian Islands and the Therianos is water reduction and water reuse, plus teaching, research and environmental technology development between Norwegian and Greek industry.

As of 2015, no update to the SPZ web site has been carried out since 2011, suggesting that this collaborative partnership may be currently struggling or on standby.
