= Kallithea, Grevena =

Kallithea Καλλιθέα
- Community
- Location within Greece
- Coordinates: 39°50.8′N 21°21.4′E
- Country: Greece
- Administrative region: Western Macedonia
- Regional unit: Grevena
- Municipality: Grevena
- Municipal unit: Gorgiani

Area
  - Community: 49.987 km^{2} (19.300 sq mi)
- Elevation: 905 m (2,969 ft)

Population (2021)
  - Community: 82
  - Density: 1.6/km^{2} (4.2/sq mi)
- Time zone: UTC+2 (EET)
  - Summer (DST): UTC+3 (EEST)
- Postal code: 510 31
- Area code: +30-2462
- Vehicle registration: PN

Kallithea (Greek: Καλλιθέα, before 1927: Μπάλτινον – Baltinon, between 1927 and 1961: Καταφύγιον – Katafygion; Aromanian: Baltino) is a village and community of the Grevena municipality. Before the 2011 local government reform it was a part of the municipality of Gorgiani, of which it was a municipal district. The 2021 census recorded 82 residents in the community. The community of Kallithea covers an area of 49.987 km^{2}. Kallithea is an Aromanian (Vlach) village.

== History ==
In 1897, during the Greco-Turkish War, the villagers of Kallithea, then Baltinon, locked themselves in their houses, refusing to join the advancing Greek volunteer forces. Greek newspaper To Asti reported that a group of about 30 Aromanians (Vlachs) that were led by Steriu Milior Apostolina, Dauca and Mihali Teguiani drove out the Greek andartes forces that attacked Baltinon and killed three-quarters of them, while another 100 Aromanians requested weapons to fight on the Ottoman side. 110 fighters from Baltinon were organized by the Aromanian schoolteacher at the Romanian school in Kranea (Aromanian: Turia), Dimitrie Cicma, to oppose Greek forces attempting to enter the village.

== Administrative division ==
The community of Kallithea consists of two separate settlements:

- Kallithea (population 19 as of 2021)
- Prionia (population 63)

Former villages:

- Veloni

== See also ==
- List of settlements in the Grevena regional unit
