= Holocaust of Kedros =

1944 Nazi German massacre in Greece

- Location: 35.211°N 24.624°E; Kedros villages, Rethymno, Crete, Kingdom of Greece (under German-occupation)
- Date: 22 August 1944
- Weapons: machine guns and rifles
- Deaths: 164 civilians (Mass murder)
- Perpetrator: Generalleutnant Friedrich-Wilhelm Müller: 22nd Luftlande Infanterie-Division

The Holocaust of Kedros (Greek: Ολοκαύτωμα του Κέντρους/Κέδρους), also known as the Holocaust of Amari (Greek: Ολοκαύτωμα του Αμαρίου), was the mass murder of the civilian residents of nine villages located in the Amari Valley on the Greek island of Crete during its occupation by the Axis powers in World War II.

The operation was carried out on 22 August 1944 by Wehrmacht infantry and was followed in the coming days by the razing of most villages, looting, pillage of livestock and destruction of harvests. The number of Greek fatalities was 164. The operation was ordered by Generalleutnant Friedrich-Wilhelm Müller, commander of the garrison of Crete, to intimidate the population and deter local guerrillas from attacking the occupation forces during their imminent retreat to Chania.

The massacre was justified as a reprisal operation mounted by Nazi German forces partly in response to the kidnapping of General Heinrich Kreipe, the Wehrmacht’s commander of Fortress Crete, by British and Greek SOE operatives in April 1944.

== Background ==
=== Geography ===
The Amari basin is a scenic fertile valley lying five to six hundred meters above sea level in the southeast part of the Rethymno regional unit. It is located between the Ida (Psiloritis) massif in the east and the conical-shaped mount Kedros (Greek: Κέντρος) in the west. In sharp contrast with the barren mountain peaks overlooking it, the valley has plenty of water and vegetation and has been inhabited as early as the Minoan era.

Most of the villages are gathered around the foothills. The valley has long been used for agriculture and numerous olive and fruit trees are grown there. To promote agricultural education, a school called Scholi Asomaton (Greek: Γεωργική Σχολή Ασωμάτων) was established in 1927 in the buildings of a former monastery located in the valley.

=== During World War II ===
The valley is located away from the major urban centers and saw little presence of German forces during the occupation. It provided shelter to several Commonwealth military personnel still hiding on the island. Many more had crossed the valley heading to the south coast for evacuation to Egypt. Later, residents helped transport supplies and equipment for guerrillas opposing German occupation, as well as offering food to them. Amari became an important center of the Cretan resistance.

The support of the locals, combined with the region's beauty, led the British Special Operations Executive (SOE) agents then serving in Crete to coin the nickname Lotus Land for the Amari valley. Among those who sheltered there were Tom Dunbabin, Xan Fielding, and Patrick Leigh Fermor who used various hideouts in the nearby slopes. Furthermore, the abductors of General Kreipe stayed at a sheepfold in Amari for a couple of nights during their march southwards.

At the time of the Kedros operation, it was clear that Germany was losing the war. By late summer 1944, the occupying forces had begun to plan their withdrawal to Chania, where they stayed until their capitulation on 9 May 1945.

== The massacre ==
At dawn on 22 August, several battalions of German infantry (presumably belonging to the 16th regiment of the 22. Luftlande Infanterie-Division) arrived at the Amari valley. They succeeded in surrounding the villages lining the western side of the Amari valley without being noticed by their dwellers. These villages are collectively called the Kedros villages, namely Gerakari, Gourgouthi, Kardaki, Vryses, Smiles, Drygies, Ano Meros, and Chordaki. The nearby village of Krya Vrysi (Κρύα Βρύση) was also surrounded. In all villages, the German raids followed roughly the same pattern.

The locals were gathered together, the identities of males were verified, and those to be executed were picked and kept separately. Women were ordered to return to their homes and collect their valuables, on the excuse that they would go on a long journey. This was a ruse to facilitate the looting that would follow. Women, children, and the elderly were taken away, while the men whose lives were spared were forced to march towards Rethymno where they were held in Fortezza for a few weeks. Following their departure, firing squads started the executions in groups. When finished, dead bodies were doused in petrol and set on fire. In some cases, the executions were carried out in a village house which was afterwards dynamited, such as in Gerakari, Vryses, and Ano Meros.

In the days following the shootings, village homes were looted and then burned or dynamited, like in Kandanos three years earlier. The looted property was collected at Scholi Asomaton and transported by lorries to Rethymno. Harvests and livestock were confiscated for use by the German troops. Local resistance bands could do nothing but watch, being vastly outnumbered. George Psychoundakis mentions in his book that, from his hideout cave in Ida, he could see smoke rising from the villages for more than a week.

== Aftermath ==
Many accounts of the destruction of the Kedros villages adopt the official German narrative and seek to attribute it to the residents' having provided shelter to Kreipe's abductors. This is disputed by some historians, as the abduction had taken place almost four months earlier on 26 April 1944, and the standard German practice was to implement immediate reprisals. Another explanation is that the Germans destroyed Kedros to terrorize the local population and reduce the risk of being attacked during their impending retreat, which eventually started in early October. In Beevor's words, "the Amari operation was essentially a campaign of pre-emptive terror just before the German forces withdrew westwards from Heraklion with their flank exposed to this centre of Cretan resistance".

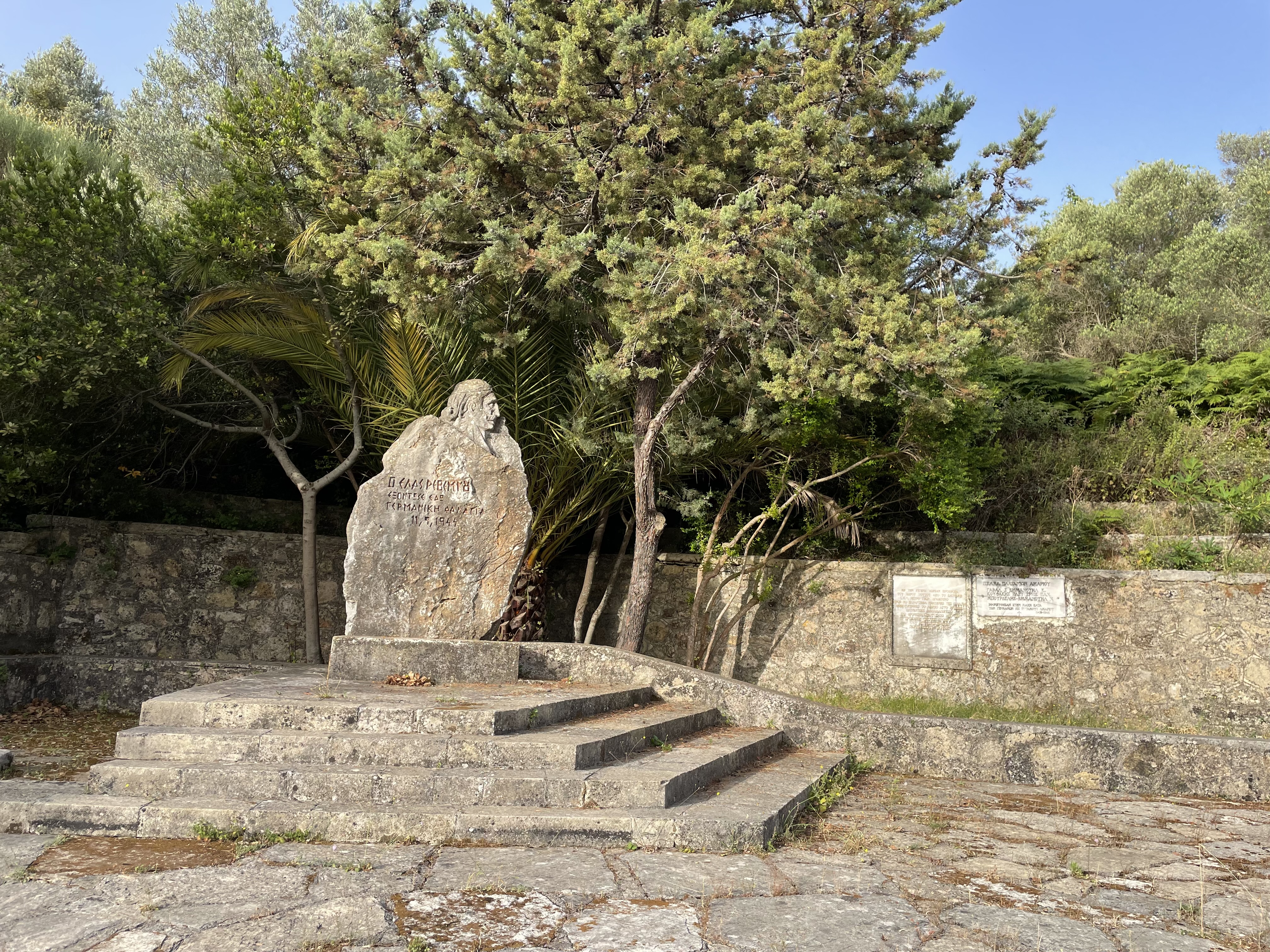
Memorial to the Battle of Potamoi.

At dawn on 11 September 1944, a local ELAS detachment surrounded Scholi Asomaton and captured the garrison of the German outpost established there. Later the same morning, two lorries carrying German troops sent from Rethymno were ambushed at the watershed ridge near the village of Ag. Apostoloi. The battle that followed became known as the Battle of Potamoi (Greek: Η μάχη των Ποταμών); it continued during the following day as German reinforcements arrived. The "Battle of Potamoi" ended with ELAS' victory. 20 to 30 Germans were killed and others captured alive.

General Müller was captured by the Red Army in East Prussia and later extradited to Greece. He was tried in Athens along with Bruno Bräuer, commander of the ‘’Festung Kreta’’ between 1942 and 1944, for the atrocities committed on the island. Both were convicted, sentenced to death on 9 December 1946, and executed by firing squad on 20 May 1947.

No one else was brought to justice and no reparations paid to the survivors. The anniversary of the destruction of the villages of Kedros is commemorated with events held by turns in a different village every year.

== See also ==
- Holocaust of Viannos
- Razing of Anogeia
- War crimes of the Wehrmacht
- Oradour-sur-Glane massacre
