= Monastiraki, Crete =

Coordinates: 35.2303°N 24.6713°E

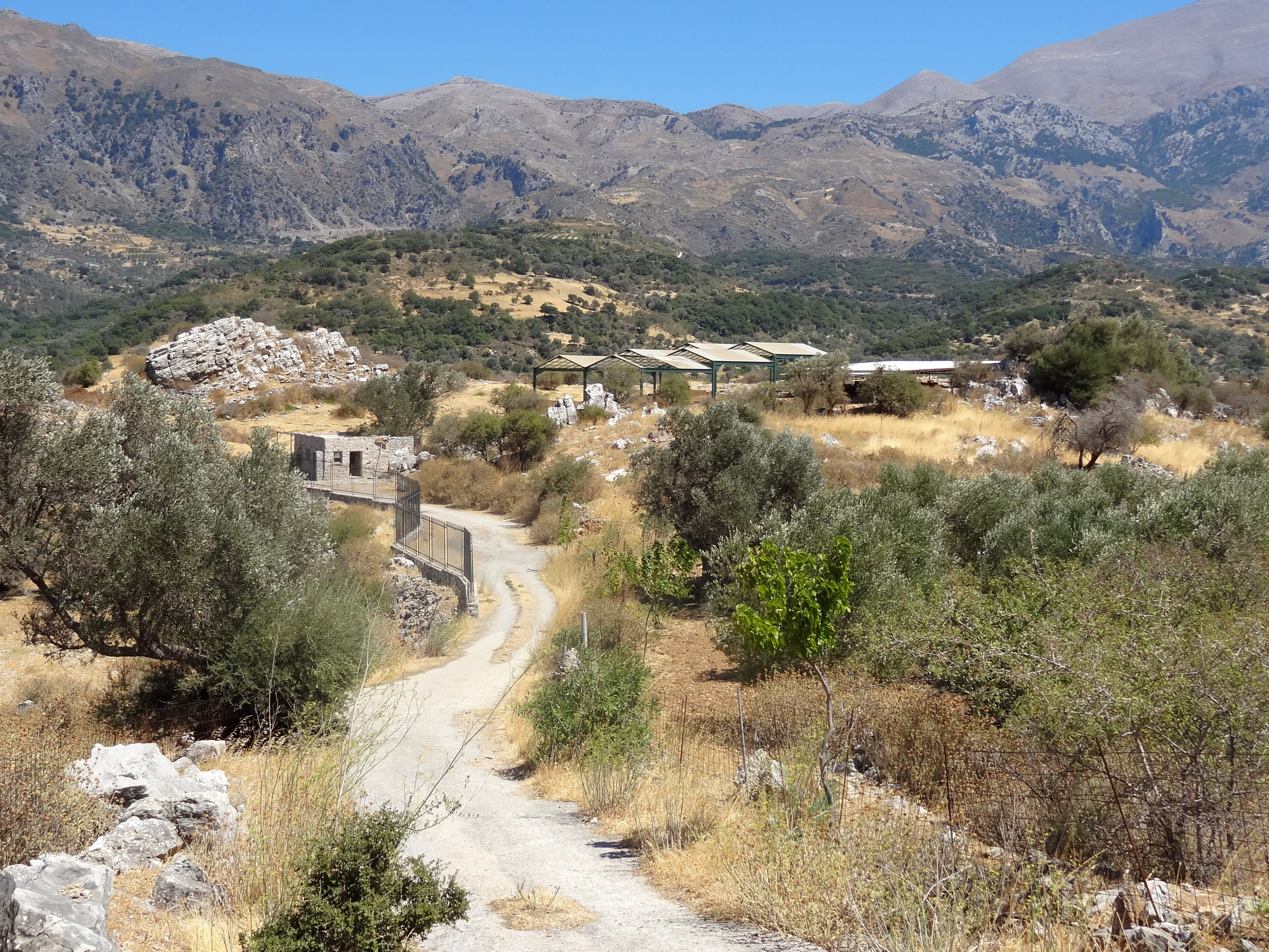
The site in its setting

Monastiraki (Greek: Μοναστηράκι) is the archaeological site of an ancient Minoan town on the island of Crete. The site is on the plain of Amari, west of the Ida massif, 38 kilometres (24 miles) from Rethymnon.

Monastiraki likely dates to the Middle Minoan Old Palace period and was destroyed at the same time as the old palaces. Its importance for archaeology, then, lies in the fact that it was not subsequently built on and remains one of the best examples of Middle Minoan archaeology on the island. It is clearly located on a strategically important site, dominating the Amari Valley which connects the south coast of Crete to the west of Phaistos with the north coast of Crete at present day Rethymno. It is quite likely that Monastiraki was developed by Phaistos inhabitants founding a satellite center. (Hogan, 2007)

The site may have been a Minoan palace, and has thus far yielded a complex of buildings, including storehouses, two archive rooms of earthenware stamps and sanctuaries.

== Archaeology ==
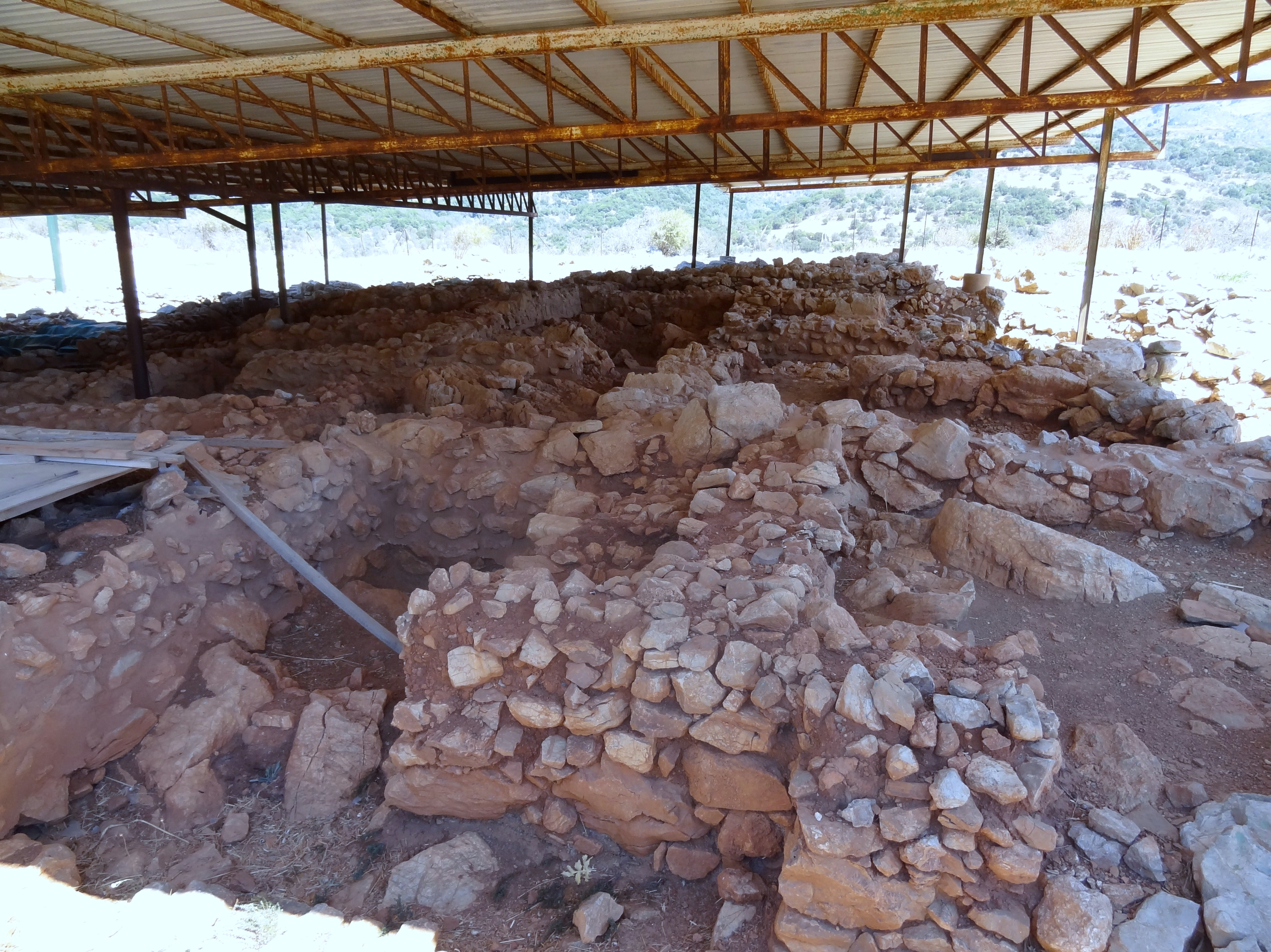
Archaeological site of Monastiraki, Amari Municipality, Greece

Monastiraki was first excavated during World War II by the German Archaeological Institute. Excavations began again in 1980 by the University of Crete. Three areas have now been excavated. In the early 1980s an Italian team excavated a small area at the north end of the site where the first store of seals was found. Nearby is the area that was illegally excavated by the Germans during the Second World War. Their excavation was based on the notebooks of the noted British archaeologist J. D. S. Pendlebury, who was captured and executed by the Germans after the Battle of Crete. The Germans concluded that Monastiraki was a small site and their excavations were not extensive. Greek archaeologists have recently revisited the German excavations with some interesting results.

The main part of the excavation lies to the south of these two areas and is under the supervision of Greek archaeologist Athanasia Kanda. There is not very much published in the public domain, and photography is still forbidden at the site, a ruling enforced by the local villagers who allow visitors onto the site.

  As at August/2022, there is an "Entrance Kiosk" for the issue of Entrance Tickets" at a cost of 2 Euros per person, with a one page 'guide' sheet available, in a selection of languages.  The lady "guardian" was *delighted* to see Visitors.  We were perhaps the only 'foreigners' she had seen all week / month ...

== See also ==
- List of ancient Greek cities
