= Amari Valley =

Greek valley

Coordinates: 35.220°N 24.640°E

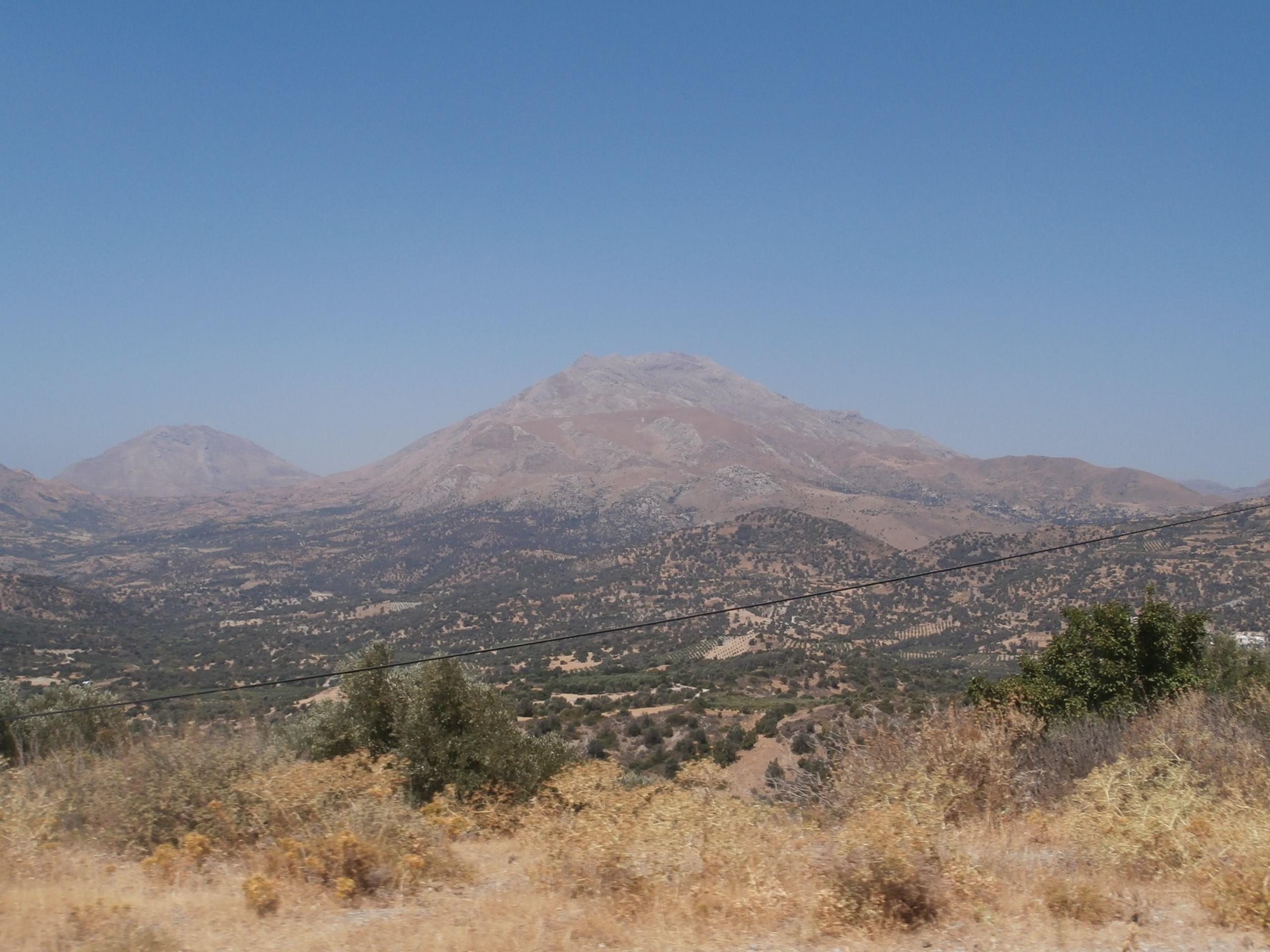
Amari Valley, looking towards Mt. Kedros

The Amari Valley is a fertile valley on the foothills of Mount Ida and Mount Kedros in Crete. The valley was known as a center of resistance to the Germans during the Battle of Crete and the German occupation. After the abduction of General Heinrich Kreipe, the German army destroyed a number of villages in the area, killing more than 160 of their inhabitants.

== Prehistory ==
The ancient city of Phaistos expanded with satellite development into the Amari Valley in the late Bronze Age, establishing a settlement at Monastiraki.

== See also ==
- Phaistos
- Holocaust of Kedros
