= Mount Kedros =

Mountain on the island of Crete in Greece

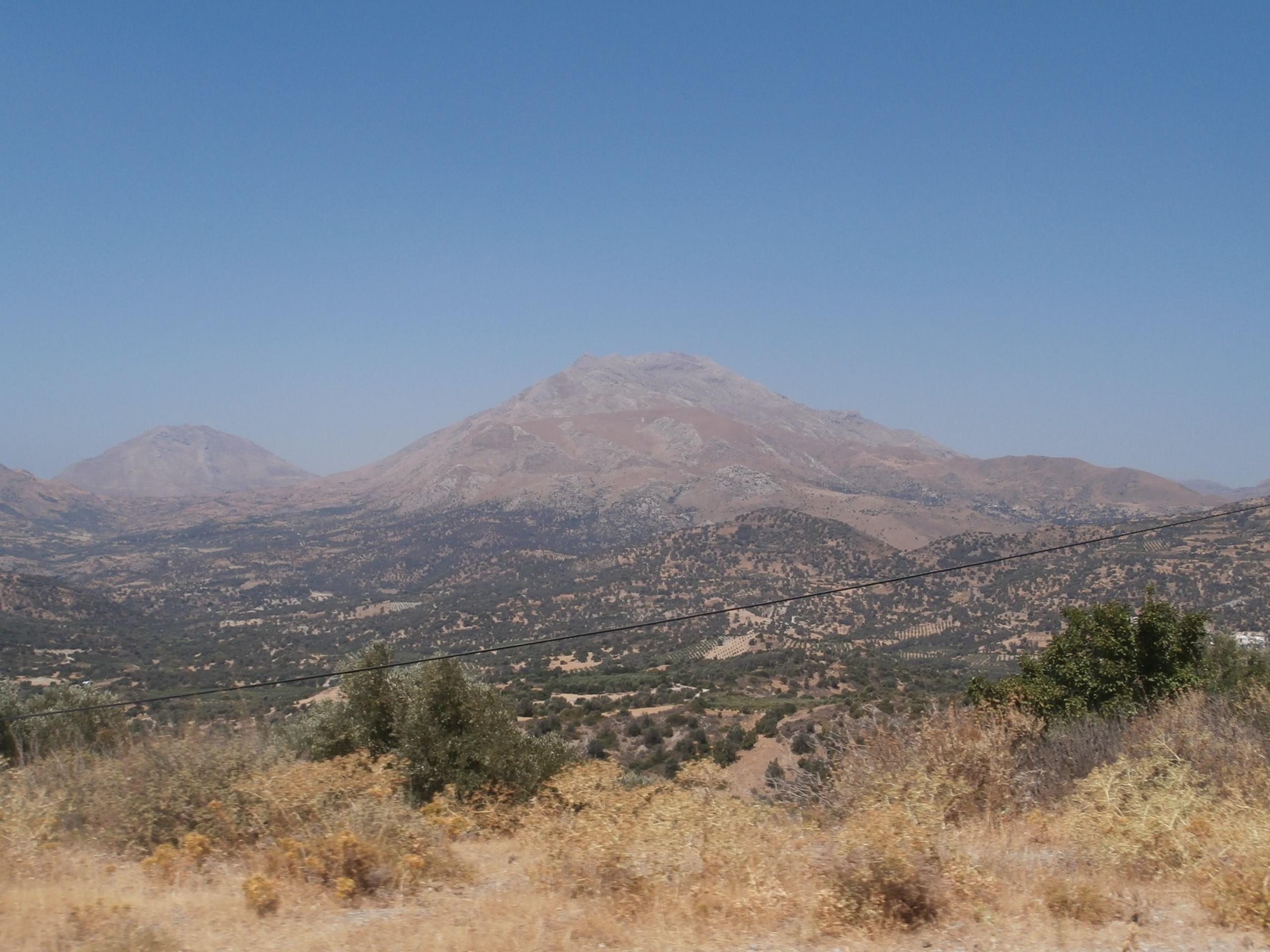

Highest point
- Elevation: 1,777 m (5,830 ft)
- Prominence: 1,300 m (4,300 ft)
- Listing: Ribu
- Coordinates: 35°10′54″N 24°37′03″E

Geography
- Location within Greece
- Location: Island of Crete, Greece

Mount Kedros (Greek: Όρος Κέντρος, also Κέδρος), is a mountain on the island of Crete in Greece. It is located southwest of the Ida massif with which it forms the two flanks of the Amari Valley. Mount Kedros is conical-shaped and made of limestone. Its landscape abounds with canyons and rock cliffs and is almost barren, with dry scrubs and phrygana being the major forms of vegetation. Kedros grows endemic or rare flowers such as tulips, anemones, corn marigolds, turban buttercups, tassel hyacinths, orchids, etc., and provides ideal conditions for the nesting of falcons as well as larger birds of prey such as griffon vultures, golden eagles and Bonelli's eagles. Owing to the significance of its flora and fauna, Mount Kedros is a node of the Natura 2000 network of protected areas. An E4 mountain footpath climbs up to the highest peak of the site. To the north of Kedros are located the plateau Gious Kampos and the Kissano gorge.

A belt of villages collectively known as the Kedros villages are built on its slopes at altitudes ranging between 400 and 600 m. During WW II, their dwellers supported the local resistance fighters who used Mt. Kedros as their hideout. In reprisal, the German occupation forces destroyed the Kedros villages and murdered several of their inhabitants.

== See also ==
- Holocaust of Kedros
