= Ano Gerakari =

Ano Gerakari Άνω Γερακάρι
- Community
- Location within Greece
- Coordinates: 37°49′N 20°48′E
- Country: Greece
- Administrative region: Ionian Islands
- Regional unit: Zakynthos
- Municipality: Zakynthos
- Municipal unit: Alykes

Population (2021)
  - Community: 700
- Time zone: UTC+2 (EET)
  - Summer (DST): UTC+3 (EEST)
- Vehicle registration: ZA

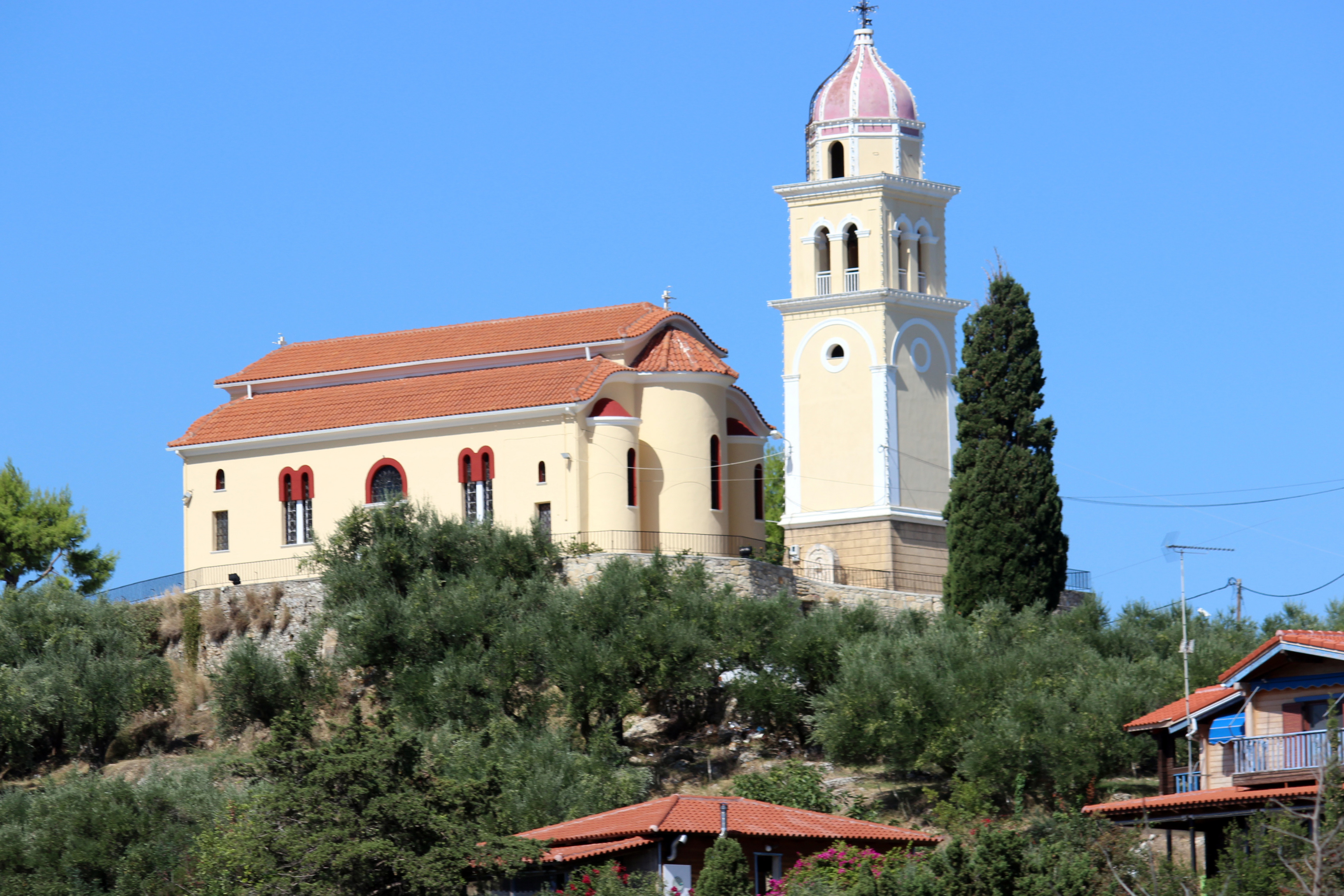
St. Nicholas Church with bell tower in Ano Gerakári, Zakynthos, Greek Ionian Islands

Ano Gerakari (Greek: Άνω Γερακάρι) is a hilltop village and a community in the municipal unit of Alykes on the island of Zakynthos, Greece. The community includes the villages Alonia and Kastelia. Ano Gerakari is adjacent to the northwest of Meso Gerakari, 4 km east of Katastari and 9 km northwest of Zakynthos city. It suffered great damage from the 1953 Ionian earthquake.

Alonia is the largest village of the community. It lies northwest of Ano Gerakari, at the foot of the hill.

== Population ==
Year	Village population	Community population
1981	-	563
1991	203	-
2001	195	720
2011	176	709
2021	146	700

== See also ==
- List of settlements in Zakynthos
