= Alykes =

Alykes Αλυκές
- Municipal unit
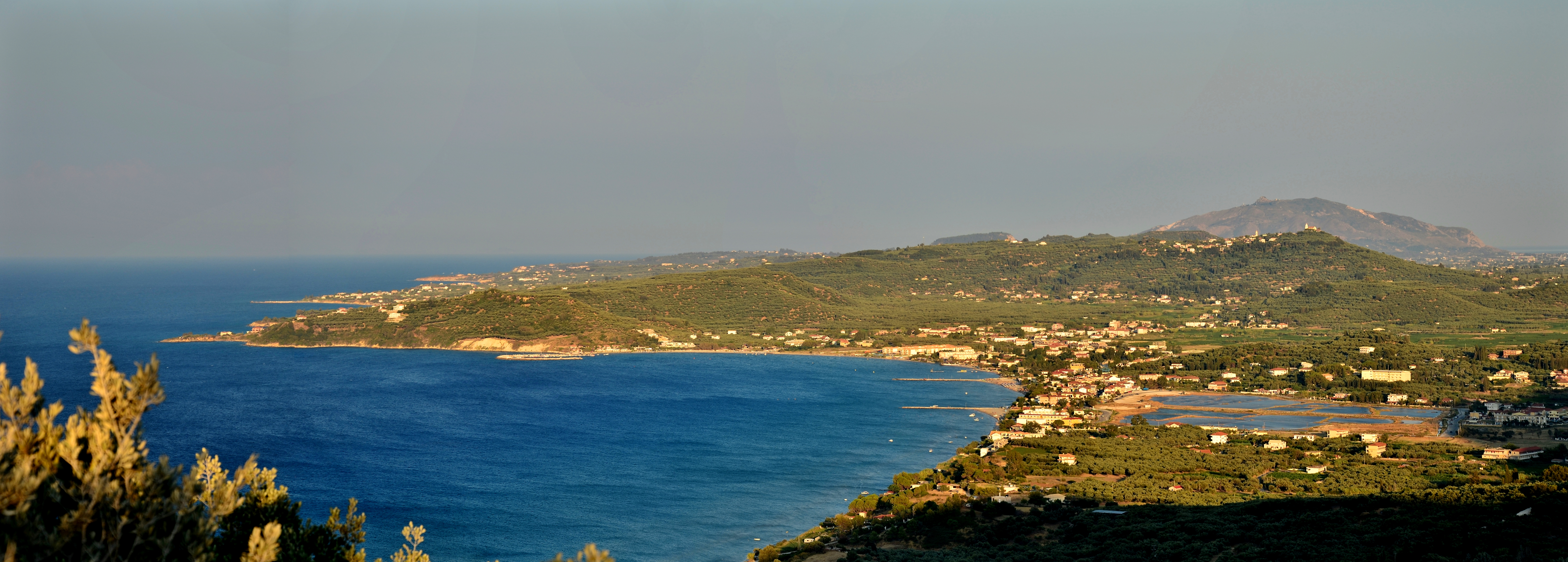
- Bay of Alykes looking south showing the village of Alykes nearest (with the salt flats to the right) with Alikanas beyond.

- Location within the regional unit

- Location within Greece
- Coordinates: 37°50′N 20°46′E
- Country: Greece
- Administrative region: Ionian Islands
- Regional unit: Zakynthos
- Municipality: Zakynthos

Area
  - Municipal unit: 42.9 km^{2} (16.6 sq mi)

Population (2021)
  - Municipal unit: 5,069
  - Municipal unit density: 118/km^{2} (306/sq mi)
- Time zone: UTC+2 (EET)
  - Summer (DST): UTC+3 (EEST)
- Vehicle registration: ZA
- Website: www.alykes.gr

Alykes (Greek: Αλυκές) is a former municipality on the island of Zakynthos, Ionian Islands, Greece. Since the 2011 local government reform it is part of the municipality Zakynthos, of which it is a municipal unit. It is situated along the northeastern coast of the island, about 10 km (6.2 mi) northwest of Zakynthos (city). It has a land area of 42.881 km^{2} (16.6 sq mi). The seat of the municipality was in Katastari.

== Subdivisions ==
The municipal unit Alykes is subdivided into the following communities (constituent villages in brackets):

- Agios Dimitrios (Agios Dimitrios, Drakas)
- Alikanas
- Ano Gerakari (Ano Gerakari, Alonia, Kastelia)
- Katastari
- Kallithea
- Kato Gerakari
- Meso Gerakari (Meso Gerakari, Psarou)
- Pigadakia
- Skoulikado

== Population ==
Year	Population
1991	4,313
2001	4,796
2011	5,203
2021	5,069
