= Gerakari, Rethymno =

Gerakari Γερακάρι
- Village
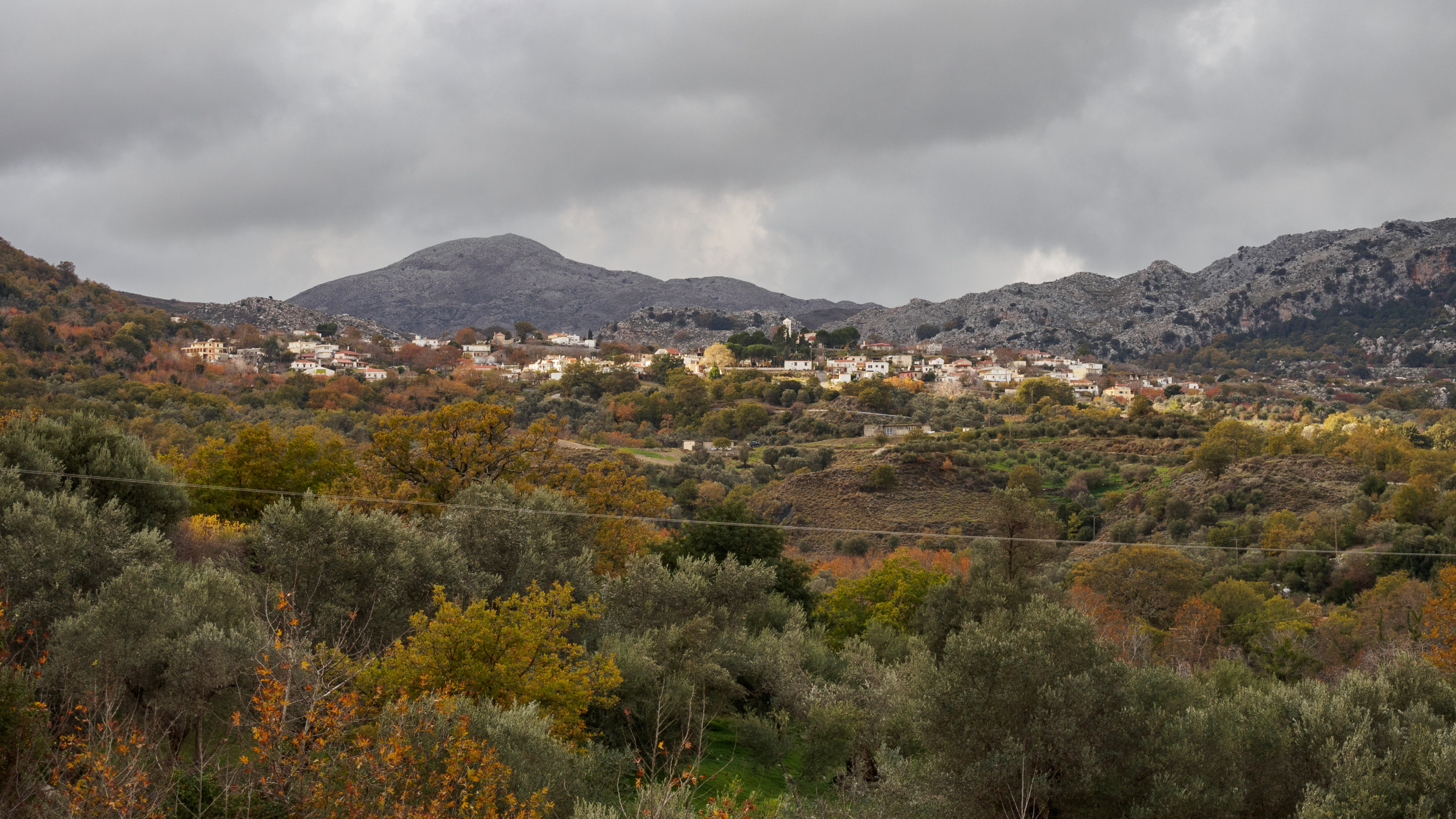
- Interactive map of Gerakari
- Country: Greece
- Decentralized administration: Crete
- Region: Crete
- Regional unit: Rethymno
- Municipality: Amari
- Elevation: 680 m (2,230 ft)

Population (2021)
  - Total: 355
- Postal code: 740 61
- Tel. code: 28330

Gerakari (Greek: Γερακάρι) is a village in the municipality of Amari of Rethymno regional unit of Crete. It is in a mountainous area below Mount Kedros.

It lies 35 kilometres south of the city of Rethymno. It is located on the E4 European Path.
