= Vrachionas =

Peak on Zakynthos, Ionian Islands, Greece

Highest point
- Elevation: 2,480 feet (760 m)
- Coordinates: 37°48′52″N 20°42′32″E

Geography
- Location: Zakynthos, Ionian Islands, Greece

Climbing
- First ascent: Unknown

Vrachionas, also known as Vrakhiónas, is the highest peak on the island Zakynthos which is one of the Ionian Islands of Greece in the Mediterranean Sea. Vrachionas stands 756 metres (2,480 ft) high.
