= Agia Galini =

Agia Galini Αγία Γαλήνη
- Community
- Location within Greece
- Coordinates: 35°5′47″N 24°41′17″E
- Country: Greece
- Administrative region: Crete
- Regional unit: Rethymno
- Municipality: Agios Vasileios
- Municipal unit: Lampi

Population (2021)
  - Community: 646
- Time zone: UTC+2 (EET)
  - Summer (DST): UTC+3 (EEST)
- Postal code: 74056

Agia Galini (Greek: Αγία Γαλήνη) is a village in Rethymno regional unit, Crete, Greece.

== Name ==
During the Minoan civilisation (c.3000BC—c.1450BC) the village used to be a city called Soulia or Soulina, and was the port of ancient Syvritos.

There are several competing origins for the source of Galini's name. According to the Greek Orthodox Church, Agia Galini (St. Galini) is said to have been martyred in Corinth in the 3rd century AD with her feast-day being celebrated on the 16th of April, and it is possible that the village was named after her.

The name Agia Galini may also be traced to the Byzantine Empress Eudocia. At around 441 AD, Eudocia (Athinais), wife of Emperor Theodosius II, was exiled to Africa having fallen into disgrace on suspicion of infidelity. The ship on which she was being transported was caught in a storm in the gulf of Messara when she is said to have prayed to the Virgin Mary for aid. The vessel safely reached the harbour shore Soulia (now Agia Galini) at which time Eudocia made a vow and built a church in honour of the Virgin Mary. The church was named “Holy (Αγια) Virgin of serenity (Γαλήνη)”. The Byzantine church of the “Panagia” is in the cemetery of Agia Galini, overlooking the beach.

Historical writings suggest a further possibility that when the Christian faith came to Crete a monastery was established named Galinios Christos (the Serene Christ) and that the village adopted the name of the monastery.

An additional belief is that the village took its name from the phrase “Aei Galini” (“ever peace”), because the harbour is always calm and peaceful.

== Geography ==
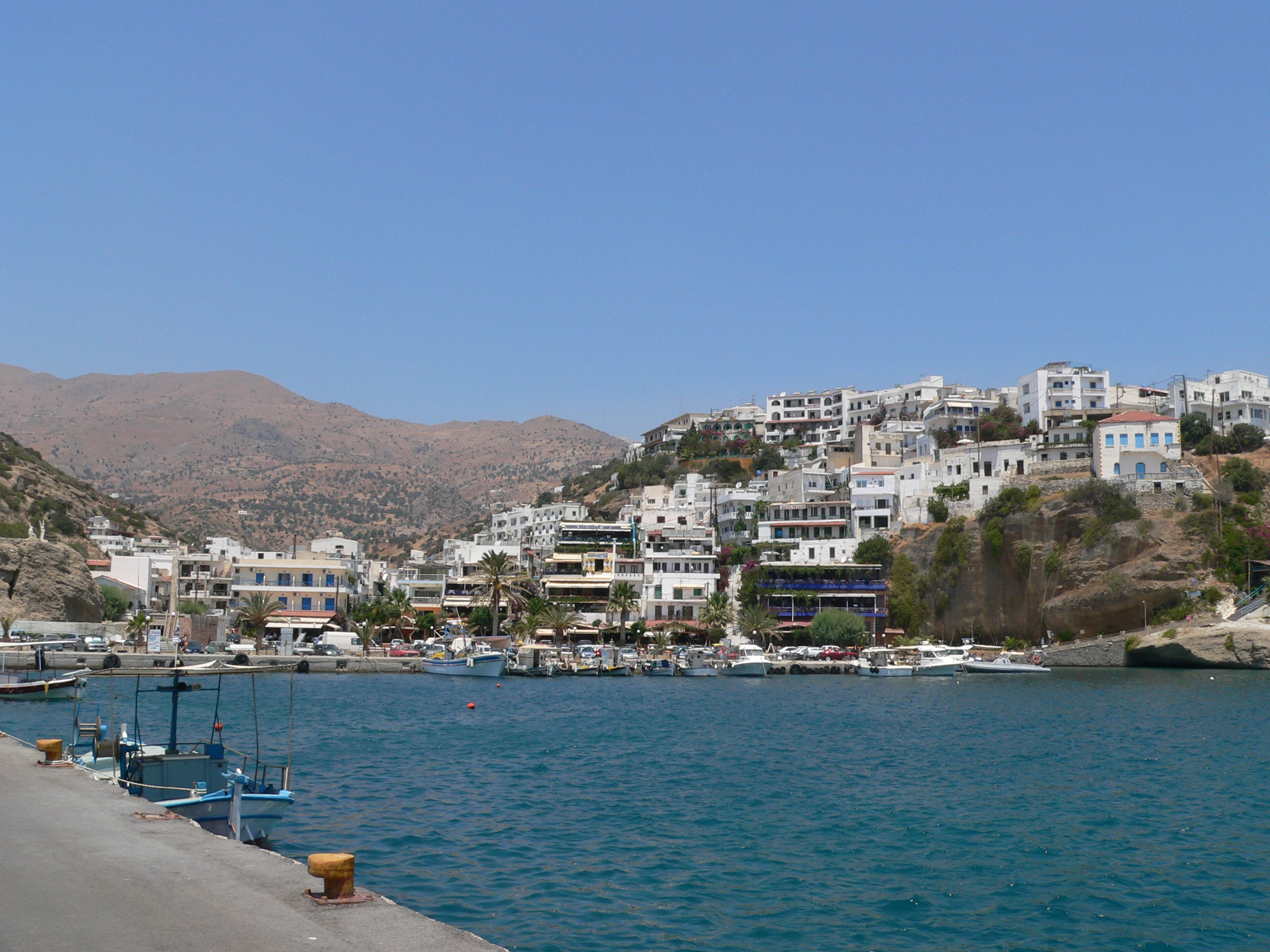
View of Agia Galini

Agia Galini is a large village, which occupies the extreme SE. end of Rethymno regional unit to the Libyan Sea. Located at the limits of Heraklion prefecture, built amphitheatrical on an east faced rocky extreme, and it has a great environment and a wonderful climate. The community is classified as a rural lowland settlement, with an area of 11.812 km ² and a weighted average altitude of 25 (20 the settlement). Distanced about 55 km from Rethymno and 68 km from Heraklion.

== Sources ==
- Papyrus Larousse Encyclopædia Britannica, 1978, 2006
- Papyrus Larousse Encyclopedia, 1963 Edition
- Encyclopedia Structure, 2002-4
- Agency publications 'Greece' maps (Varelas)
- Magazine 'Holiday', ed DOL, 2010
- Maps «ROAD»
- Greek Statistical Authority (EES)
- eetaa.gr
