= Kranea, Grevena =

Kranea Κρανέα
- Community
- Location within Greece
- Coordinates: 39°53.8′N 21°16.8′E
- Country: Greece
- Administrative region: Western Macedonia
- Regional unit: Grevena
- Municipality: Grevena
- Municipal unit: Gorgiani

Area
  - Community: 70.929 km^{2} (27.386 sq mi)
- Elevation: 960 m (3,150 ft)

Population (2021)
  - Community: 192
  - Density: 2.71/km^{2} (7.01/sq mi)
- Time zone: UTC+2 (EET)
  - Summer (DST): UTC+3 (EEST)
- Postal code: 510 31
- Area code: +30-2462
- Vehicle registration: PN

All Saints Church, Krania

Kranea or Krania (Greek: Κρανέα or Κρανιά, Aromanian: Turia) is a village and community of Grevena municipality. Before the 2011 local government reform it was a part of the municipality of Gorgiani, of which it was a municipal district. The 2021 census recorded 192 residents in the village. The community of Kranea covers an area of 70.929 km^{2}. Kranea is an Aromanian (Vlach) village.

According to traveller François Pouqueville, Kranea was formed in 1507 when the villages of Turia and Paleohori were merged.

== See also ==
- List of settlements in the Grevena regional unit
