= Katastari =

Katastari Καταστάρι
- Community
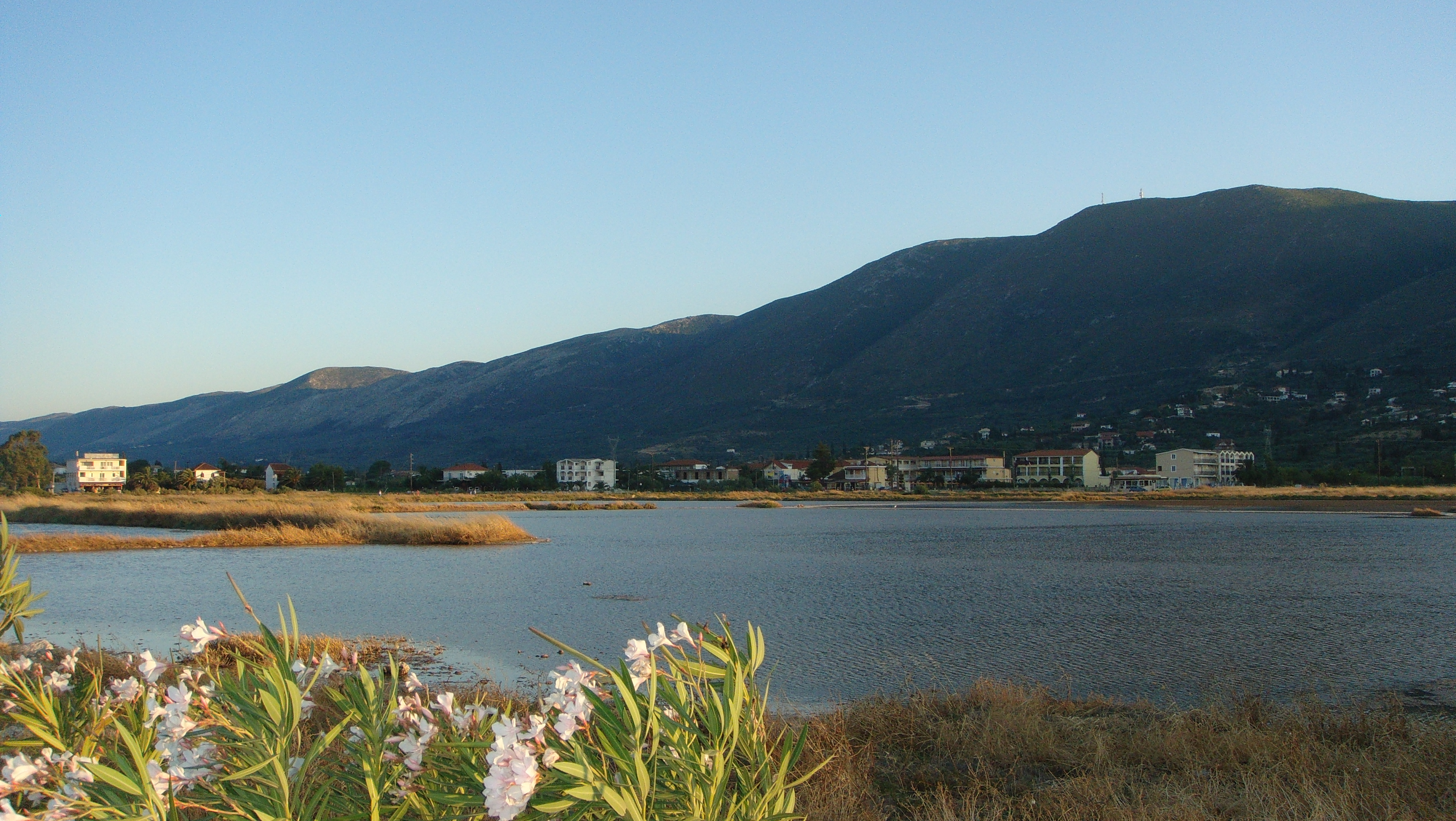
- Katastari, Greece

- Location within Greece
- Coordinates: 37°49.7′N 20°45.4′E
- Country: Greece
- Administrative region: Ionian Islands
- Regional unit: Zakynthos
- Municipality: Zakynthos
- Municipal unit: Alykes

Population (2021)
  - Community: 1,331
- Time zone: UTC+2 (EET)
  - Summer (DST): UTC+3 (EEST)
- Vehicle registration: ZA

Katastari (Greek: Καταστάρι) is a village and a community in the Alykes municipal unit of the island Zakynthos, Greece. It is situated at the foot of the Vrachionas mountain, 2 km from the Ionian Sea coast. It is located 13 kilometers northwest of Zakynthos City and 10 km southeast of Volimes.

== Population ==
Year	Population
1981	1,097
1991	1,190
2001	1,287
2011	1,379
2021	1,331
