= Meso Gerakari =

Meso Gerakari Μέσο Γερακάρι
- Community
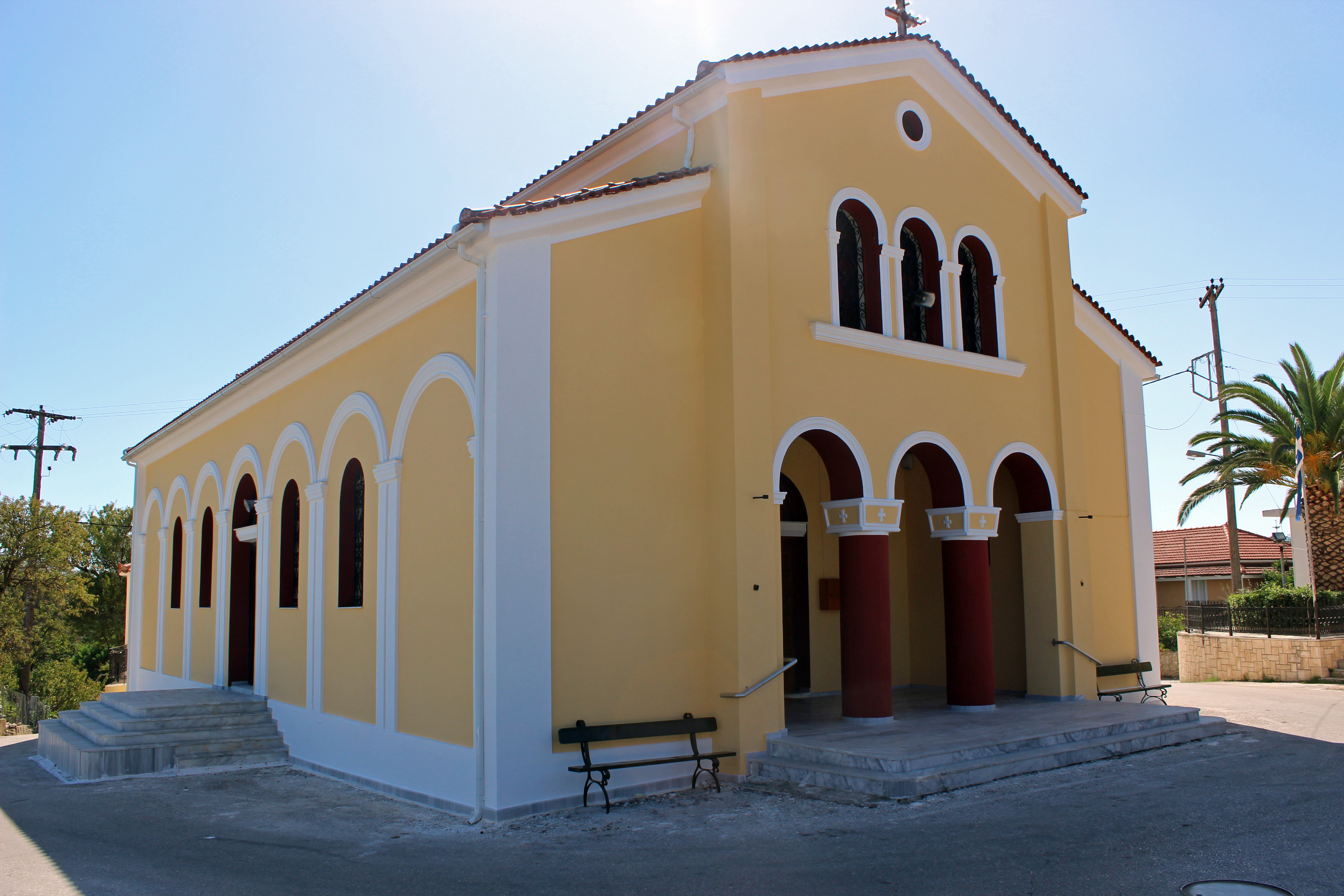
- Panagia Church

- Location within Greece
- Coordinates: 37°49′08″N 20°48′18″E
- Country: Greece
- Administrative region: Ionian Islands
- Regional unit: Zakynthos
- Municipality: Zakynthos
- Municipal unit: Alykes

Population (2021)
  - Community: 343
- Time zone: UTC+2 (EET)
  - Summer (DST): UTC+3 (EEST)

Meso Gerakari (Greek: Μέσο Γερακάρι) is a village in the municipal unit of Alykes on the island Zakynthos, Greece. According to the 2021 census, Meso Gerakari had 343 inhabitants.
