= Spili =

Village in Crete, Greece

Spili Σπήλι
- Community
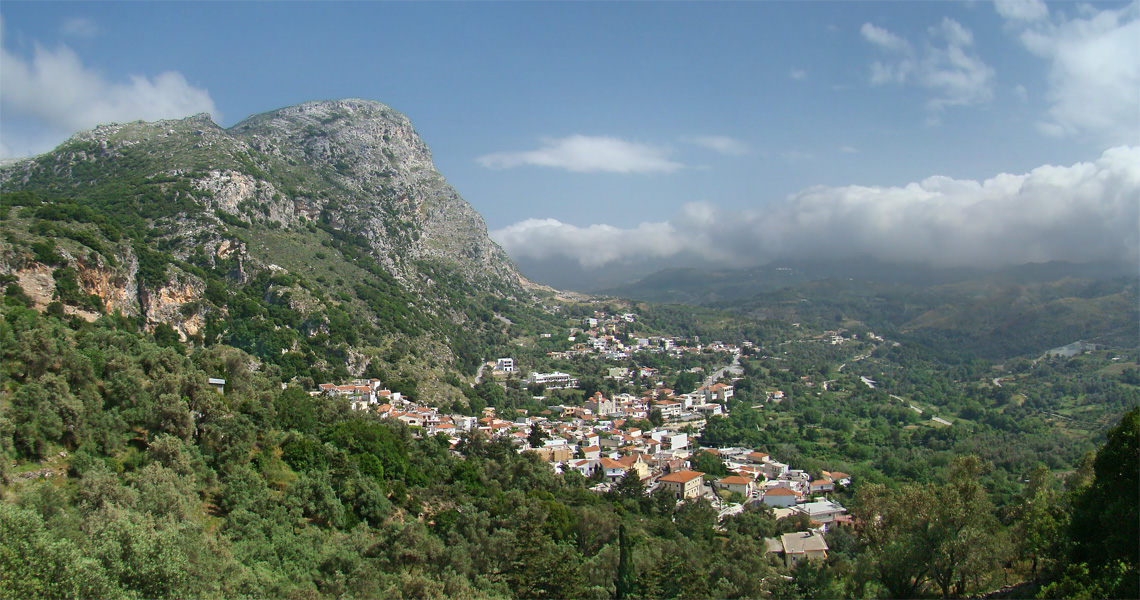
- View of Spili

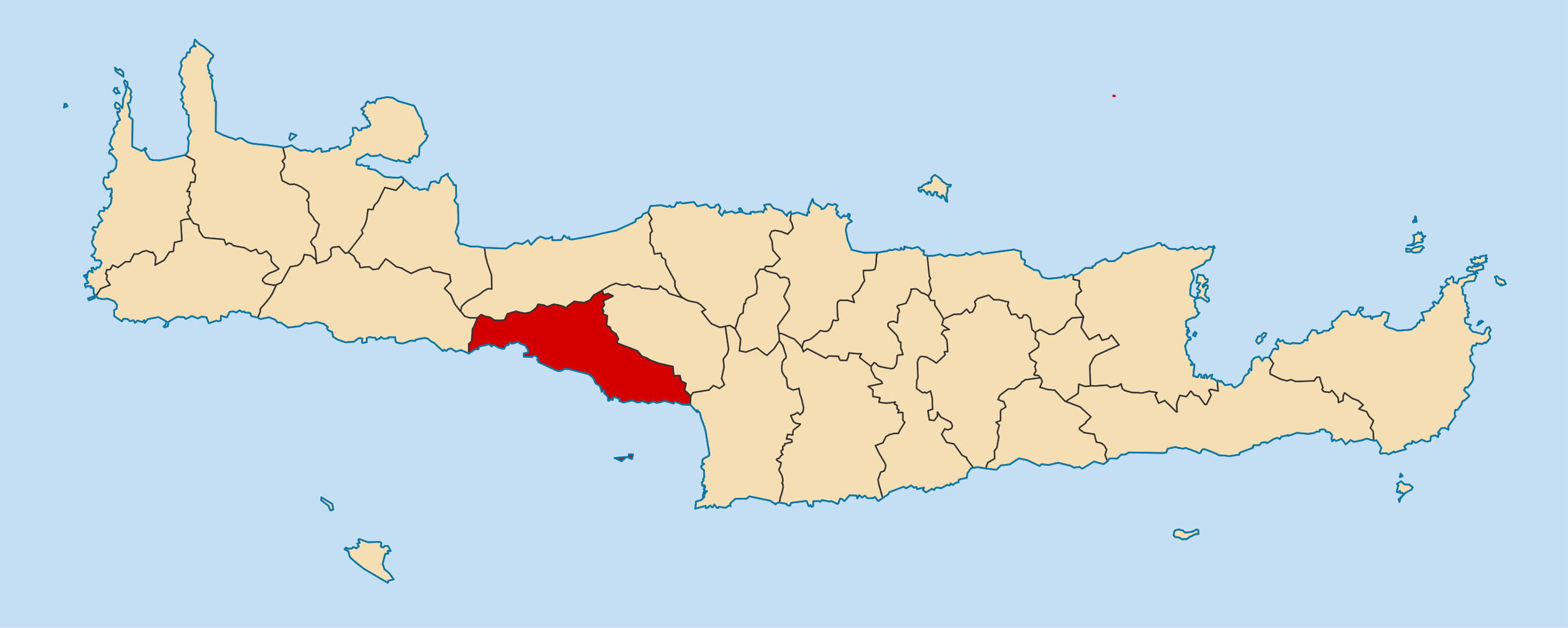

- Location within Greece
- Coordinates: 35°13′N 24°32′E
- Country: Greece
- Administrative region: Crete
- Regional unit: Rethymno
- Municipality: Agios Vasileios
- Municipal unit: Lampi

Population (2021)
  - Community: 634
- Time zone: UTC+2 (EET)
  - Summer (DST): UTC+3 (EEST)

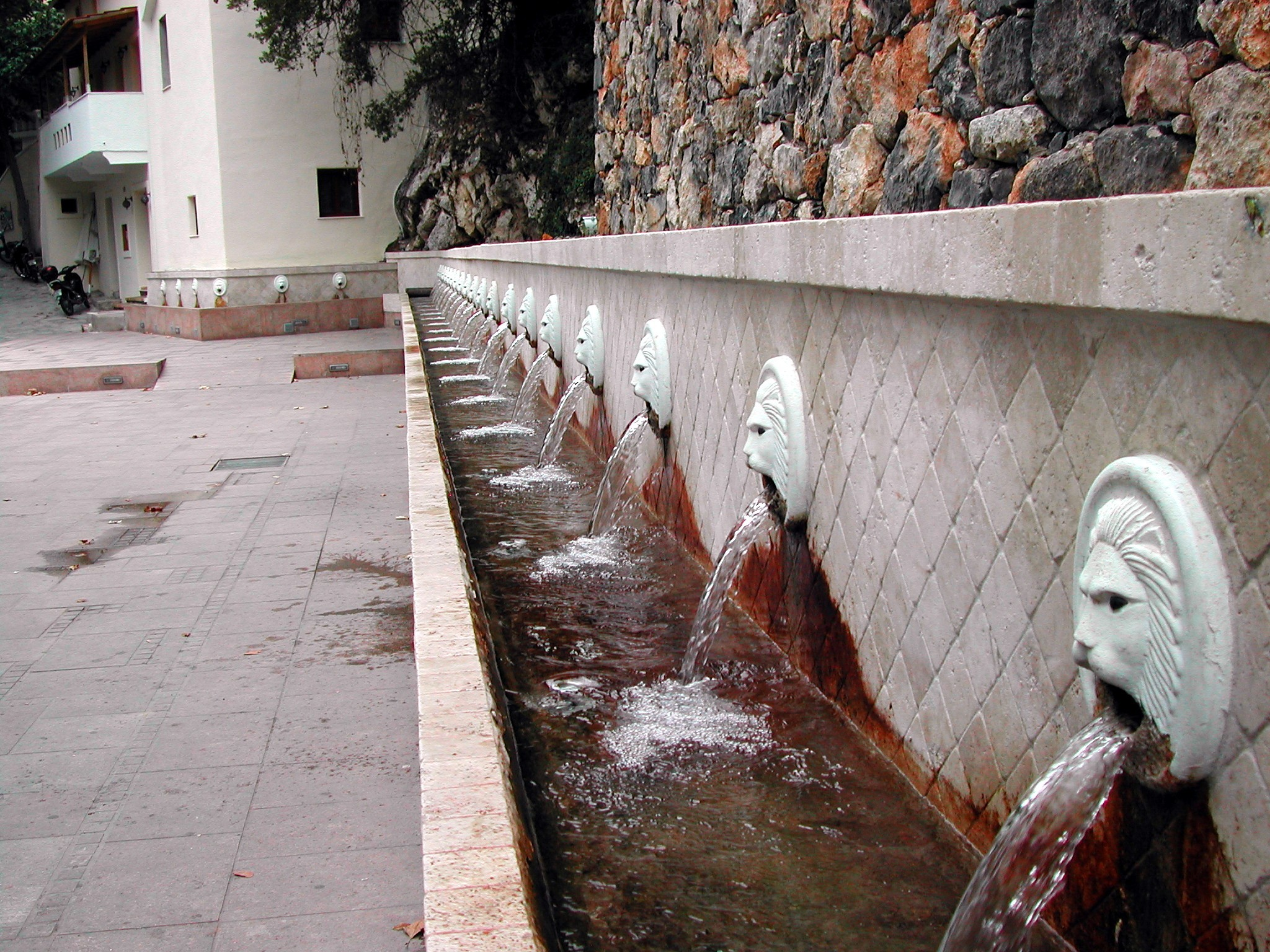
Venetian fountain in Spili

Spili (Greek: Σπήλι) is a village in Rethymno regional unit, Crete, Greece. It is the seat of the Agios Vasileios municipality.
